= List of schools in Rocky Mount, North Carolina =

This is a list of schools in Rocky Mount, North Carolina.

== Higher education ==
- Edgecombe Community College (Rocky Mount campus)
- Nash Community College
- North Carolina Wesleyan University

== Public schools ==
=== High schools ===
- The Centre for Industry Technology and Innovation
- Nash Central High School
- Nash Rocky Mount Early College
- Northern Nash High School
- Rocky Mount High School
- Southern Nash High School
- Southwest Edgecombe High School

=== Middle schools ===
- Edwards Middle School
- Nash Central Middle School
- Parker Middle School
- Red Oak Middle School
- Rocky Mount Middle School
- Southern Nash Middle School
- West Edgecombe Middle School

=== Elementary schools ===
- Bailey Elementary School
- Baskerville Elementary School
- Benvenue Elementary School
- Braswell Elementary School
- Cedar Grove Elementary School
- Coopers Elementary School
- Englewood Elementary School
- GW Bulluck Elementary
- Hubbard Elementary School
- Johnson Elementary School
- Middlesex Elementary School
- Nashville Elementary School
- Pope Elementary School
- Red Oak Elementary School
- Spring Hope Elementary School
- Swift Creek Elementary School
- Williford Elementary School
- Winstead Avenue Elementary School

=== Alternative and exceptional schools ===
- Nash Rocky Mount Early College
- Tar River Academy
- WL Greene Alternative School

=== Charter schools ===
- Rocky Mount Preparatory School

== Private schools ==
- Cornerstone Christian Academy
- Crown of Victory Christian School
- Faith Christian School
- Grace Christian School
- New Life Christian Academy
- Our Lady of Perpetual Help (OLPH)
- Rocky Mount Academy
- Showers of Blessing Christian Academy
