= Southern Nash High School =

American public school in North Carolina

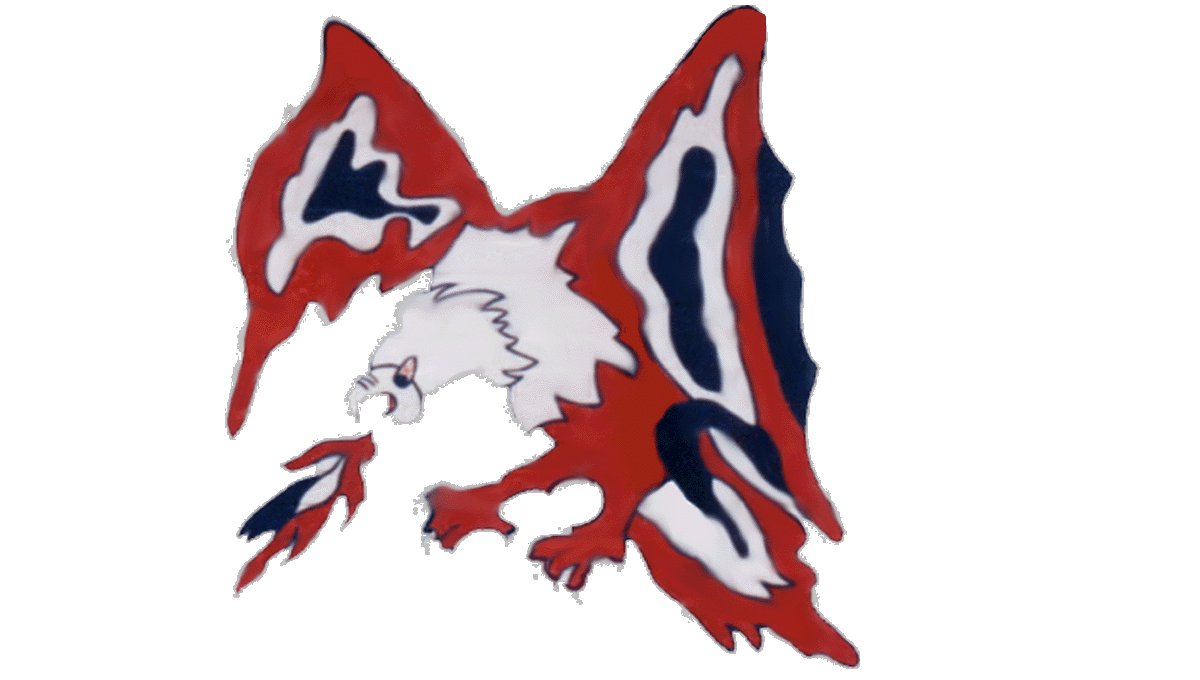

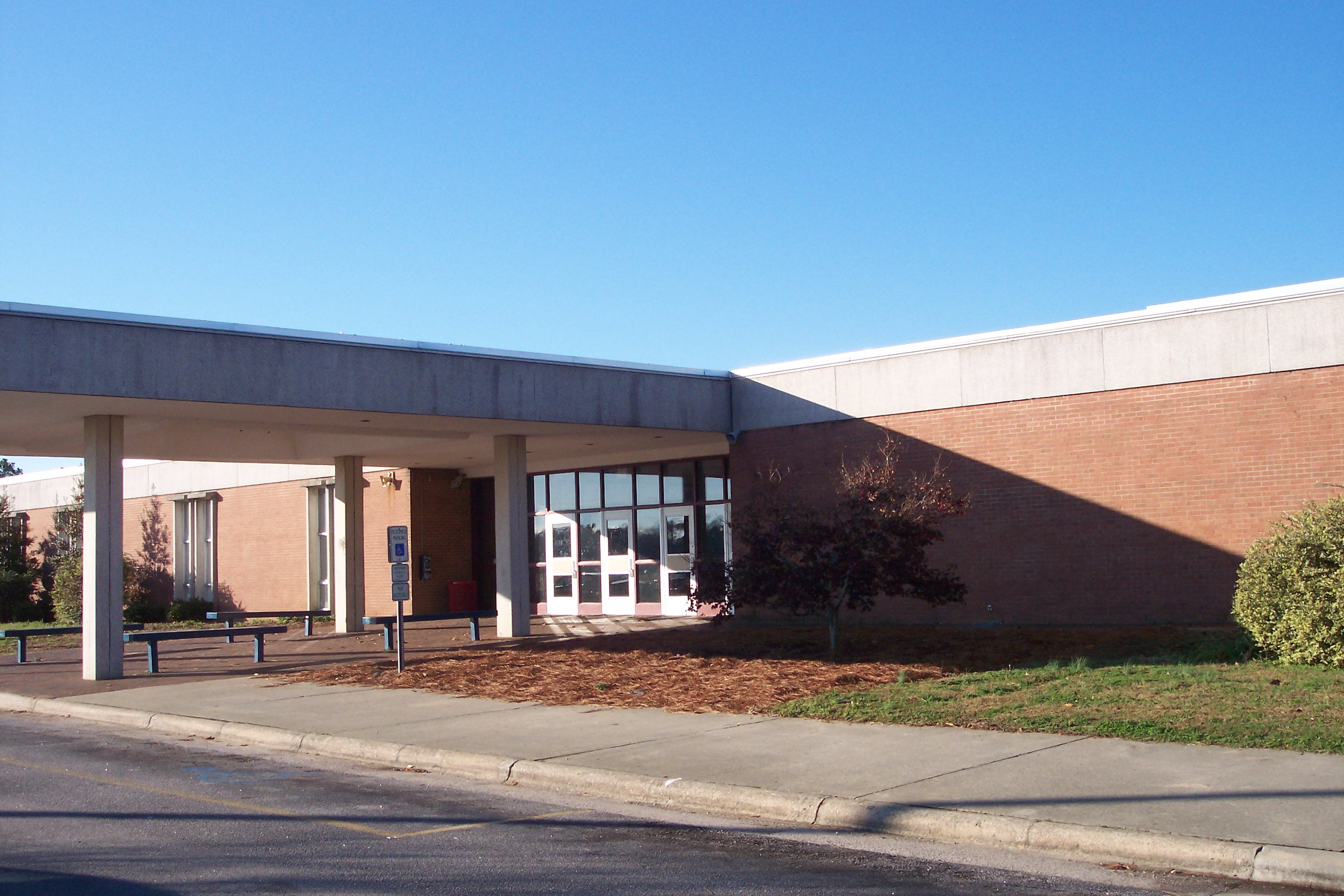

Location
- 6446 Southern Nash High Road; Bailey, Nash County, North Carolina 27806; United States; 35°51′05″N 78°05′14″W

Information
- School type: Public
- Motto: Strength through unity
- Established: 1968 (58 years ago)
- School district: Nash-Rocky Mount Public Schools
- CEEB code: 340215
- Principal: Hugh Scott
- Teaching staff: 52.79 (on an FTE basis)
- Grades: 9–12
- Enrollment: 1,073 (2023–2024)
- Student to teacher ratio: 20.33
- Campus size: 82 acres (330,000 m^{2})
- Colours: Red, navy, and white
- Athletics: 3A
- Athletics conference: Big East
- Mascot: Hottie the Firebird
- Team name: Firebirds
- Website: SNHS/ Southern Nash High School

Southern Nash High School is a public high school in Bailey, North Carolina. It is one of four high schools in Nash-Rocky Mount Public Schools and has the second-largest enrollment of the four.

== History ==
Southern Nash High School was created by the consolidation of Bailey High School, Coopers, Middlesex and Spring Hope school's high school programs. It opened in 1968. The opening of Nash Central High School in 2003 drew off some of its student population.

== Curriculum ==
Southern Nash offers Advanced Placement courses in United States History and English Literature & Composition, as well as online calculus AB. College-level courses are also available through distance learning and partnerships with Nash Community College and the University of North Carolina - Greensboro. In 2007, Southern Nash High School surpassed the state average End-of-Course scores in algebra I, algebra II, biology, United States history, and geometry. Other academic programs at Southern Nash High School include a state recognized Youth Apprenticeship program, an award-winning architectural and graphic arts program, a NATEF certified Auto-Tech program, an aquaculture program, an agricultural program, and Health Science Academy.

=== Agricultural education ===
Southern Nash High School is home to one of the largest agriculture programs in the state of North Carolina. The school has a greenhouse, an aquaculture room, and a pond on campus. Courses like biotechnology, horticulture, forestry, aquaculture, and animal science are offered through the Agricultural Education program. Currently, Southern Nash High School boasts an animal collection which consists of snakes, catfish, tilapia, fire belly toads, crickets, giant millipedes from China, a ferret, a cow, turkeys, chickens, and goats. The Agriculture department is headed by Mike Bartholomew, Nash-Rocky Mount's Teacher of the Year in 2004–2005.

== Athletics ==
Southern Nash is a member of the 3-A Big East athletic conference, which consists of Southern Nash, Nash Central High School, Northern Nash High School, Rocky Mount High School, Fike High School, and Hunt High School. Northern Nash is considered the school's main rival, but recently Nash Central has also evolved into a rival school. Southern Nash has won three team state championships; one in softball (3-A 1995) and two in boys' outdoor track (3-A 1998, 3-A 1999). The school has also had individual state champions in indoor track, outdoor track, and wrestling.

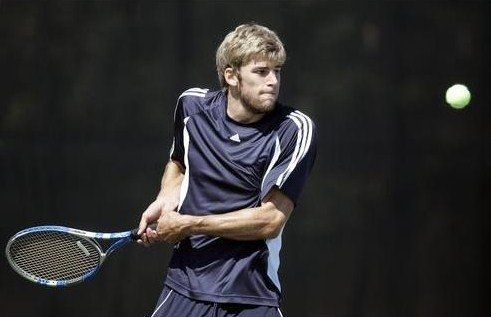
A Southern Nash tennis player (2008)

Under coach Brad Joyner, the boys' tennis team become a powerhouse during the 2000s and early 2010s, as they were consistently voted in the top 10 of the state; in 2008, they reached number one spot for the first time in school history, and held the spot for over two months. From 2003–2011, the Firebirds were 89–1 in conference play and won 9 consecutive conference championships. From 2007–2011, they were 93–2 in the regular season, including a 62–0 stretch from 2007–2009. The tennis team won the 2008 and 2009 Eastern Regional 3-A championships but lost the State Championship match both times to Charlotte Catholic High School and Lake Norman High School.

The football team has also experienced success, having advanced to the semifinals of the NCHSAA 3-AA playoffs in 2009, in addition to producing several NCAA Division I football players. In 2012, the boys' soccer team also reached the semifinals of the state playoffs before losing to the eventual champion, Jacksonville High School.

Southern Nash High School offers students a variety of sports, which are divided seasonally.
Fall sports:

- Boys' cross country
- Girls' cross country
- Junior varsity and varsity football
- Girls' golf
- Boys' soccer
- Girls' tennis
- Junior varsity and varsity volleyball
- Junior varsity and varsity cheerleading

Winter sports:

- Boys' junior varsity and varsity basketball
- Girls' junior varsity and varsity basketball
- Boys' indoor track and field
- Girls' indoor track and field
- Boys' swimming
- Girls' swimming
- Wrestling

Spring sports:

- Junior varsity and varsity baseball
- Boys' golf
- Girls' soccer
- Junior varsity and varsity softball
- Boys' tennis
- Boys' outdoor track and field
- Girls' outdoor track and field

Southern Nash High School also had two individual athletes win North Carolina High School Athletic Association (NCHSAA) athlete of the year: Julius Peppers in 1998 and Anna Tharrington in 1999.

== Notable alumni ==
- Quinton Cooley, college football running back at Liberty
- Zonovan Knight, NFL running back
- Julius Peppers, former NFL defensive end, 4x first team All-Pro, 9x Pro Bowl selection, 2024 Pro Football Hall of Fame Inductee
