= Kameron Johnson =

American football player (born 2002)

No. 19 – Tampa Bay Buccaneers
- Positions: Wide receiver, return specialist
- Roster status: Active

Personal information
- Born: March 17, 2002 (age 24); Rocky Mount, North Carolina, U.S.
- Listed height: 5 ft 10 in (1.78 m)
- Listed weight: 170 lb (77 kg)

Career information
- High school: Northern Nash (Rocky Mount, North Carolina)
- College: Barton (2020–2023)
- NFL draft: 2024: undrafted

Career history
- Tampa Bay Buccaneers (2024–present)

Awards and highlights
- 2× All-SAC Offensive (2022, 2023)

Career NFL statistics as of 2025
- Receptions: 4
- Receiving yards: 64
- Receiving touchdowns: 1
- Rushing yards: 24
- Return yards: 987
- Stats at Pro Football Reference

Kameron Johnson (born March 17, 2002) is an American professional football wide receiver and return specialist for the Tampa Bay Buccaneers of the National Football League (NFL). He played college football for the Barton Bulldogs.

== Early life ==
Johnson attended Northern Nash High School located in Rocky Mount, North Carolina. Coming out of high school, Johnson committed to play college football for the Barton Bulldogs.

== College career ==
Johnson had his best collegiate season in 2023 where he notched 51 receptions for 879 yards and seven touchdowns, where he was named all-conference. Johnson finished his four-year career from 2020 to 2023, playing in 37 games, totaling 151 receptions for 2,316 yards, and 19 touchdowns, while also rushing 22 times for 125 yards, while throwing for two touchdowns, and tallying 1,000 return yards and two return touchdowns. Johnson was also named all-conference twice in 2022 and 2023.

== Professional career ==
Pre-draft measurables
Height	Weight	Arm length	Hand span	Wingspan	40-yard dash	10-yard split	20-yard split	20-yard shuttle	Three-cone drill	Vertical jump	Broad jump	Bench press
5 ft 9 5/8 in (1.77 m)	184 lb (83 kg)	30 1/2 in (0.77 m)	8 1/4 in (0.21 m)	5 ft 11 5/8 in (1.82 m)	4.48 s	1.54 s	2.57 s	4.33 s	7.05 s	37.5 in (0.95 m)	10 ft 5 in (3.18 m)	21 reps
All values from Pro Day

After not being selected in the 2024 NFL draft, Johnson signed with the Tampa Bay Buccaneers as an undrafted free agent. Johnson made the team as a rookie free agent out of training camp.

In Week 1 of the 2025 season, Johnson had a 54-yard punt return that set up the go-ahead touchdown in the fourth quarter in a 23-20 win over the Atlanta Falcons, earning NFC Special Teams Player of the Week. In Week 6 against the San Francisco 49ers, Johnson scored his first career touchdown on a 34-yard reception from Baker Mayfield.
