= Montgomery Brawl (song) =

2023 hip hop song

Single by Gmac Cash
- Released: August 7, 2023
- Genre: Comedy hip hop
- Length: 1:36
- Songwriter: Gmac Cash
- Producer: Reuel StopPlaying

"Montgomery Brawl" is a single by Detroit-based comedy rapper Gmac Cash. The song is a humorous recount of the events of the Montgomery Riverfront brawl and celebrates the defenders in the event. "Montgomery Brawl" went viral and was generally well received by critics for its humor.

== Background ==
Gmac Cash is a comedy rapper from Detroit. He is best known for his songs "Big Gretch," a single praising Michigan governor Gretchen Whitmer, and "Giant Slide," a song about a notorious slide at Belle Isle Park.

On August 5, 2023, a group of white boaters attacked a Black boat captain at the Montgomery Riverfront after he untethered their boat and moved it 3 feet to the right from the space reserved for the Harriott II. The initial attack lasted about 60 seconds. Some minutes later, with the assistance of the captain, the Harriott II docked. Numerous Black passengers disembarked and attacked the white individuals who were at the opposite end of the dock, sparking the Montgomery Riverfront brawl. Gmac Cash recognized the brawl in general, and the Black defenders' acts in particular as an important mark in Black American history, telling the Detroit Free Press that "This was really a big moment for us ... I feel like this is a moment that shows we can come together, we have each other's back and that's what we should do all the time in every situation instead of sitting back watching just with a camera phone."

== Music and lyrics ==
"Montgomery Brawl" is a comedic "rap anthem" recounting the events of the Montgomery Riverfront brawl. Writing for The Fader, journalist Jordan Darville described the song's beat as "pure boilerplate Michigan" and detailed that "Gmac adopts the posture of a friend who’s outlining the video for someone who hasn’t seen it, bursting with pride throughout." Gmac Cash references multiple individual defenders, including "unc with the chair," a Black defender who utilized a folding chair as an improvised weapon. Gmac Cash also highlighted the swimming skills of "Black Aquaman," a 16-year-old defender whom he praised as "the first Black man to swim to a fight."

== Reception ==
"Montgomery Brawl" has been generally praised by music critics. Writing for HipHopDX, journalist Mackenzie Cummings-Grady praised the single as "hilarious." Darville shared Cummings-Grady's assessment of the song's comedic success and concluded that "Montgomery Brawl" is "a hilarious recap" of the events and "the song a piece of history deserves."

The song went viral and has been viewed millions of times on social media. By the afternoon of August 8, 2023, the song's music video had been viewed over 1.3 million times on Twitter. Several prominent rappers, including Big Sean, Sexyy Red, and GLC, all supported "Montgomery Brawl" in comments on Gmac Cash's Instagram page.
