= Gmac Cash =

American rapper (born 1993)

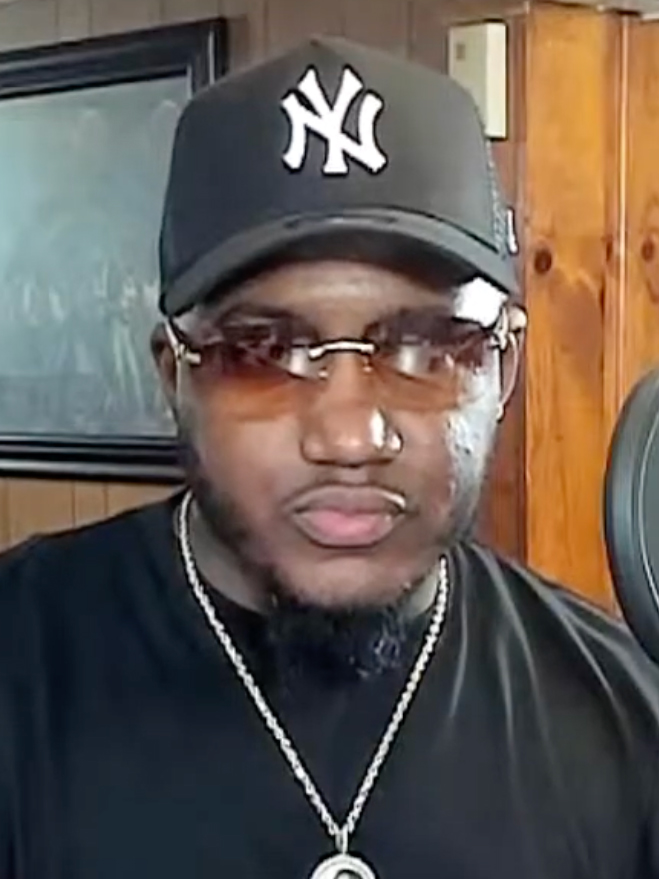
- Gmac Cash in 2022

Background information
- Born: Gerald Allen; March 12, 1993 (age 33); Detroit, Michigan, US
- Genre: Comedy hip hop
- Years active: 2011–present
- Education: Southeastern High School

Gerald Allen (born March 12, 1993), known professionally as Gmac Cash, is an American comedy rapper known for his various short songs about newsworthy topics, including the Detroit Sign, the Belle Isle Park Giant Slide, the COVID-19 pandemic, the 2022 Michigan gubernatorial election, and the Montgomery Riverfront brawl. He has also written victory songs for his hometown sports teams, the Detroit Lions, Detroit Pistons and Detroit Tigers.

Raised in Detroit, he was influenced by his mother's involvement in music and adopted the stage name "Gmac Cash", making music after graduating from high school in 2011. His breakthrough came with the song "First Day at Popeyes," recorded over Tee Grizzley's "First Day Out." He gained further recognition during the COVID-19 pandemic with songs like "Coronavirus" and "Big Gretch," the latter praising Governor Gretchen Whitmer's pandemic response. He released "Giant Slide" in 2022, which was featured on Jimmy Kimmel Live!, and "Montgomery Brawl" in 2023.

== Early life and education ==
Gerald Allen was born on March 12, 1993, in Detroit, Michigan, and was raised by his single mother on Detroit's East Side. His mother sang in her church's choir and always had music playing in their home, exposing Allen to music from a young age. He played basketball and admired player Tracy McGrady, often referred to as T-Mac, and chose his stage name "Gmac Cash" in reference to McGrady's nickname. He attended Southeastern High School and graduated in 2011.

== Musical career ==
=== Early career and first successes ===
After graduating from high school, he started making music and selling CDs out of his trunk for $10 each, forming the group True Rich with four of his high school friends. His initial success came with the song "First Day at Popeyes," where he rapped over Tee Grizzley's song "First Day Out" while driving around the city with friends. Their reactions encouraged him to record and release the song, which went viral and was reposted by WorldStarHipHop.

In 2016, he was hired at a Fiat Chrysler Automobiles stamping plant in Sterling Heights, Michigan. During this time, he made the song "FMLA" about his reluctance to go to work the next morning after a night of partying, using the Family and Medical Leave Act to be absent from work. He filmed the video for the song at a Chrysler plant in Warren, Michigan. In October 2018, plant officials requested him to remove the video because they felt it reflected poorly on the company. He complied with their request but was terminated from his job a week later for violating a company policy regarding the misuse of company property. The following year, he released the song "On Strike" along with a music video showing his participation in the United Auto Workers' strike against General Motors.

At the beginning of the COVID-19 pandemic, Gmac Cash released the song "Coronavirus," where he rapped about self-isolating and avoiding infection by staying home. In the music video, he used a spray bottle of disinfectant like a pistol while wearing a hazmat suit, a surgical mask, and medical gloves. The song went viral, with the Los Angeles Times noting that it "wring[s] goofy humor from the predicament of quarantine."

=== "Big Gretch" and viral songs ===
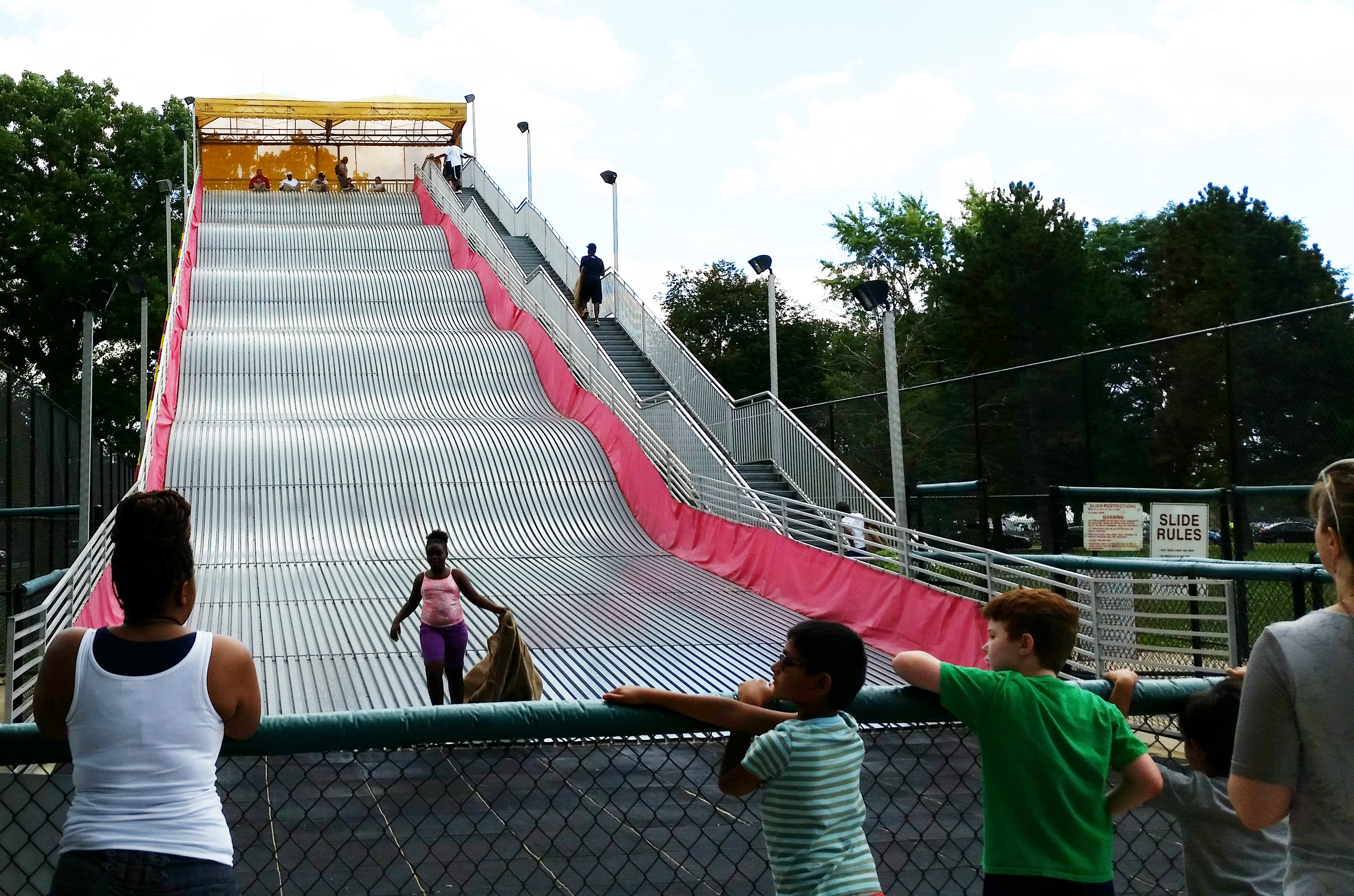
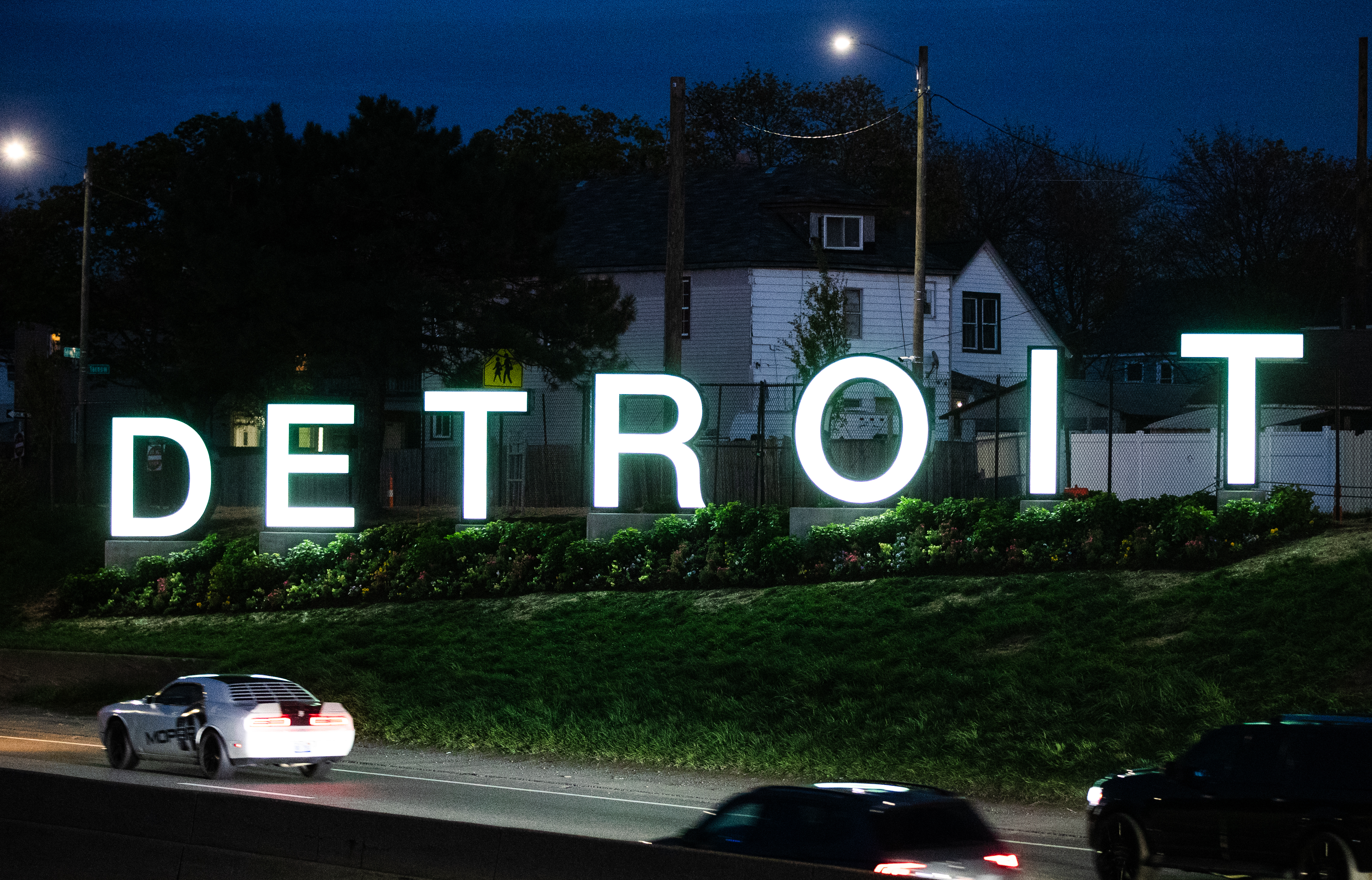
Gmac Cash has made songs on various topics including the Belle Isle Park Slide and the Detroit Sign.

Later on in May, he released the song "Big Gretch," in which he raps about Michigan Governor Gretchen Whitmer's response to the COVID-19 pandemic in Michigan and the protests against the stay-at-home orders. The song was tweeted by rapper Eminem and was featured on Pitchfork's The Ones, where it was described as "serious but not solemn" political action rap song. It was also noticed by Whitmer herself, who said on in a tweet she loved both the nickname and the song. In response, Gmac Cash started a GoFundMe campaign to gift Whitmer a pair of Buffs, a nickname for buffalo horn sunglasses produced by Cartier, which were referenced in the song. However, Whitmer declined the gift, citing that she couldn't accept items costing over $50, so the money raised was donated to a charity. She later wore Buffs in a taped segment during the City of Detroit's Everybody vs. COVID-19 online music festival held at the end of the month.

In August 2022, Gmac Cash released the song "Giant Slide" about the Belle Isle Park slide, which had recently been reopened. The song was featured on a segment on Jimmy Kimmel Live!, where guest host Lamorne Morris jokingly commented that it was "the jam of the summer." He was later invited to perform the song on the show in December, where host Jimmy Kimmel wore a pair of Buffs. A year later, he released the song "Montgomery Brawl," which recounted the events of the Montgomery Riverfront brawl. He referenced multiple people, including a Black defender who used a folding chair as an improvised weapon. Several rappers, including Big Sean, Sexyy Red, and GLC, supported "Montgomery Brawl" by commenting on Gmac Cash's Instagram page.

In April 2024, he released the song "Detroit Sign", which humorously criticized the new Detroit Sign on the Interstate 94 and satirized the city's aesthetic choices. He composed the song in just five minutes, aiming to differentiate himself from other artists in the city, and released a music video on April 12, 2024. Days later, he released a sequel titled "Detroit Sign 2", in which he addressed the sign's nighttime illumination and responded to critiques of his initial song.

Gmac Cash is also a well-known fan of Detroit's sports teams. In December 2021 he released a song called "Lions Won," when the team won it first game of the season after starting out 0-10-1 in their first 11 games. Two weeks later, he released "Lions Won Again." The song then became a viral hit among Lions fans.

In 2024, he released a similar song with different lyrics, titled "Tigers Won Again" in honor of the Detroit Tigers, who made an improbable playoff run. In 2025, the song became the official anthem that the team played after victories at Comerica Park. Gmac Cash updated the song in August 2025 to coincide with the team's 2026 schedule release.

== Personal life and artistry ==
Gmac Cash's interest in music began during his childhood, as he was exposed to musicians such as Jill Scott and Mary J. Blige when his mother played music in their home. He began listening to music on his own as a teenager and became a fan of musicians like Lil Wayne and "Weird Al" Yankovic. Yankovic's song "Trapped in the Drive-Thru," which parodied R. Kelly's "Trapped in the Closet," influenced him, making him appreciate the art of making popular songs with a comedic twist. He also acts in film and television productions and hosts a podcast.

His music has been described as "describing situations and viral moments" by Bloomberg News. Gmac Cash stated that he chose to be a comedy rapper in order to stand out. He takes little time to write and record his songs to capitalize on the freshness of the story, often receiving between 100 and 500 direct messages daily from fans requesting that he cover various topics. He is a fan of the Detroit Lions, making multiple songs in support of the team including "Lions Win", "Lions Win Again", and "We the Lions".

== Discography ==
Studio albums

- What's Funny (2018)
- King of Comedy Rap (2019)
- Goat (2019)
- The Mac Book (2020)
- Everything Ain't Funny (2020)
- King of Comedy Rap 2 (2021)
- Made in Detroit (2022)
- King Viral (2022)
- Lil Earn (2023)
- Made In Detroit 2 (2023)
