= 2024 NFL draft =

89th annual meeting of NFL franchises to select newly eligible players

General information
- Date: April 25–27, 2024
- Location: Campus Martius Park; Hart Plaza; (Detroit, Michigan)
- Networks: ESPN; ABC; NFL Network; ESPN Deportes; ESPN Radio

Overview
- 257 total selections in 7 rounds
- League: National Football League
- First selection: Caleb Williams, QB, Chicago Bears
- Mr. Irrelevant: Jaylen Key, S, New York Jets
- Most selections (12): Arizona Cardinals
- Fewest selections (5): Chicago Bears

The 2024 NFL draft was the 89th annual meeting of National Football League (NFL) franchises to select newly eligible players. The draft was held at Campus Martius Park and Hart Plaza in Detroit on April 25–27, 2024. The draft had a then-record attendance of over 775,000, which was later surpassed in 2026.

Six quarterbacks were selected in the first round—Caleb Williams, Jayden Daniels, Drake Maye, Michael Penix Jr., J. J. McCarthy, and Bo Nix—tying the record from 1983. The six were within the first 12 picks, with five in the top 10. Conversely, for the first time since the 1970 AFL–NFL merger, no quarterbacks were selected in the second through fourth rounds. Seven wide receivers were also selected in the first round, tying the record from 2004. A record 23 offensive players were selected in the first round, with 14 consecutive offensive players to start the draft.

This was also the first time that Troy Vincent announces a 2nd round pick since 2014, with the 50th pick.

== Host city ==
Detroit was chosen over Green Bay and Washington, D.C. as the host city on March 28, 2022. The city prepared to host the draft by undertaking beautification efforts, including construction work in various parts of the city and organizing a series of pop-ups to fill vacant storefronts downtown in time for the draft's visitors.

The city installed the Detroit Sign, inspired by the Hollywood Sign in Los Angeles, to welcome visitors entering the city along Interstate 94. City officials claimed to have spent $230,000 of state grant money and municipal funds on murals. Additionally $1.53 million was said to have been spent on improvements to streets and traffic lights, as well as the planting of trees and beautification of roadway medians. The hosting of the draft was regarded to have been a success, with the city experiencing an estimated economic impact of $160 million.

As part of an effort to beautify the city, the city's Planning and Development Department, Downtown Detroit Partnership, and the City Office of Arts, Culture and Entrepreneurship partnered with Street Art for Mankind (SAM)'s "Be The Change" campaign to create seven sizable murals. The murals, however, became a subject of controversy. Criticism arose that international artists involved in the paintings may have been compensated below market rate for their work. The artworks became more controversial after the City Council refused to approve payment for the works, arguing that they had been approved without following the approval process imposed by the city charter. City employees' emails were later released under the Freedom of Information Act and revealed that department officials had considered the painting of buildings with historic designation without the required approval of the Historic District Commission.

Temporary stage being erected at Campus Martius Park ahead of the draft

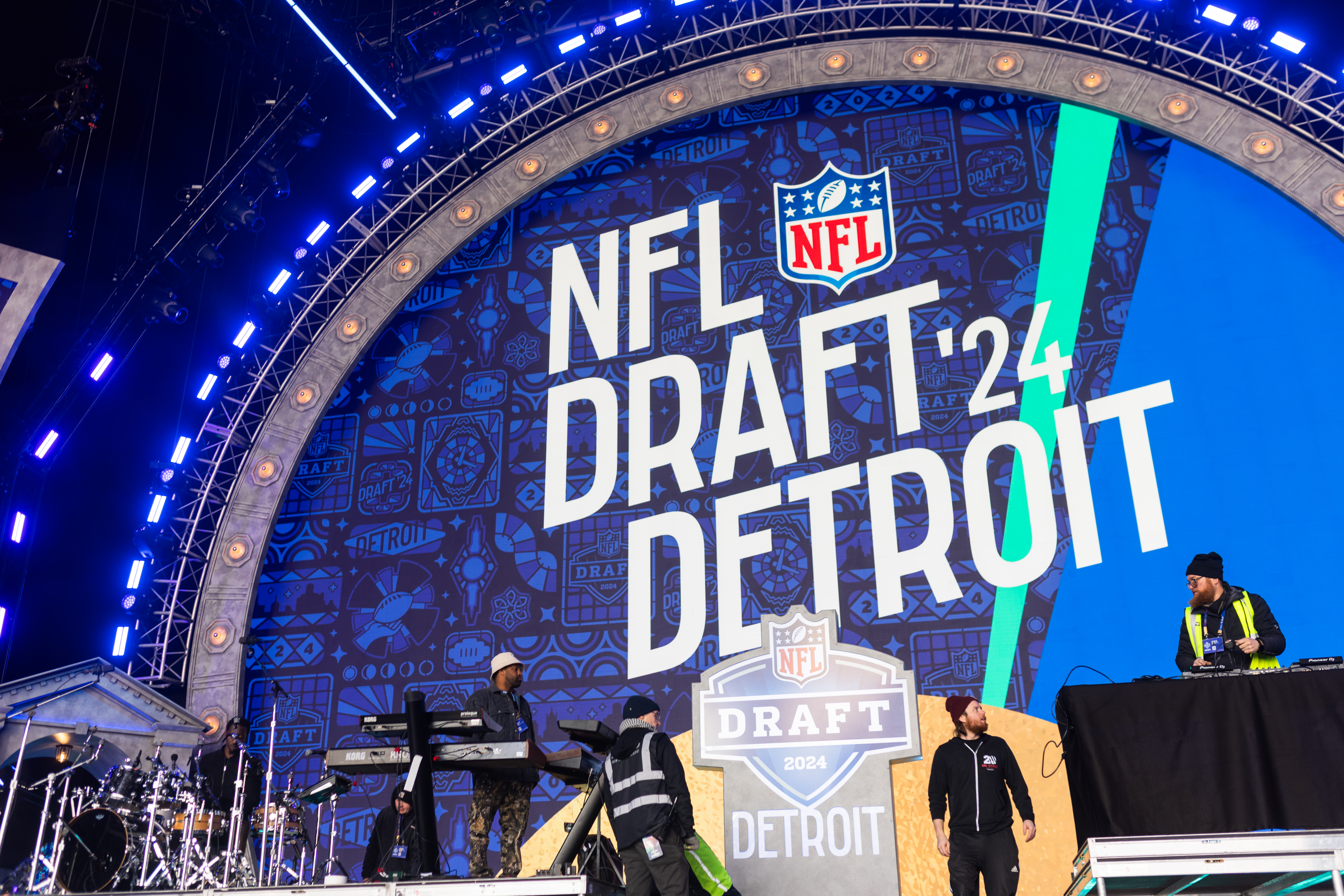
Draft stage (closeup view)

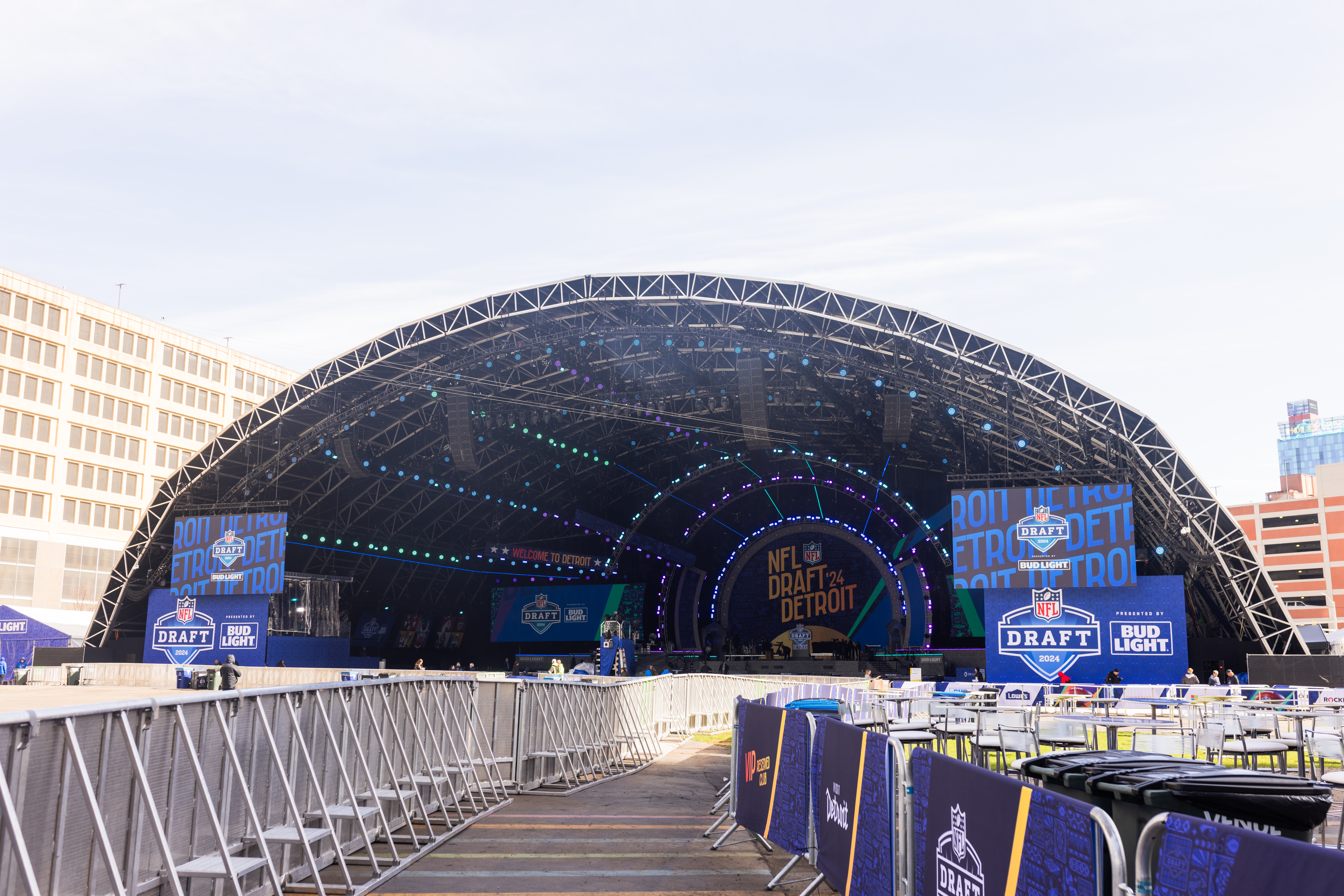
Draft stage (distant view)

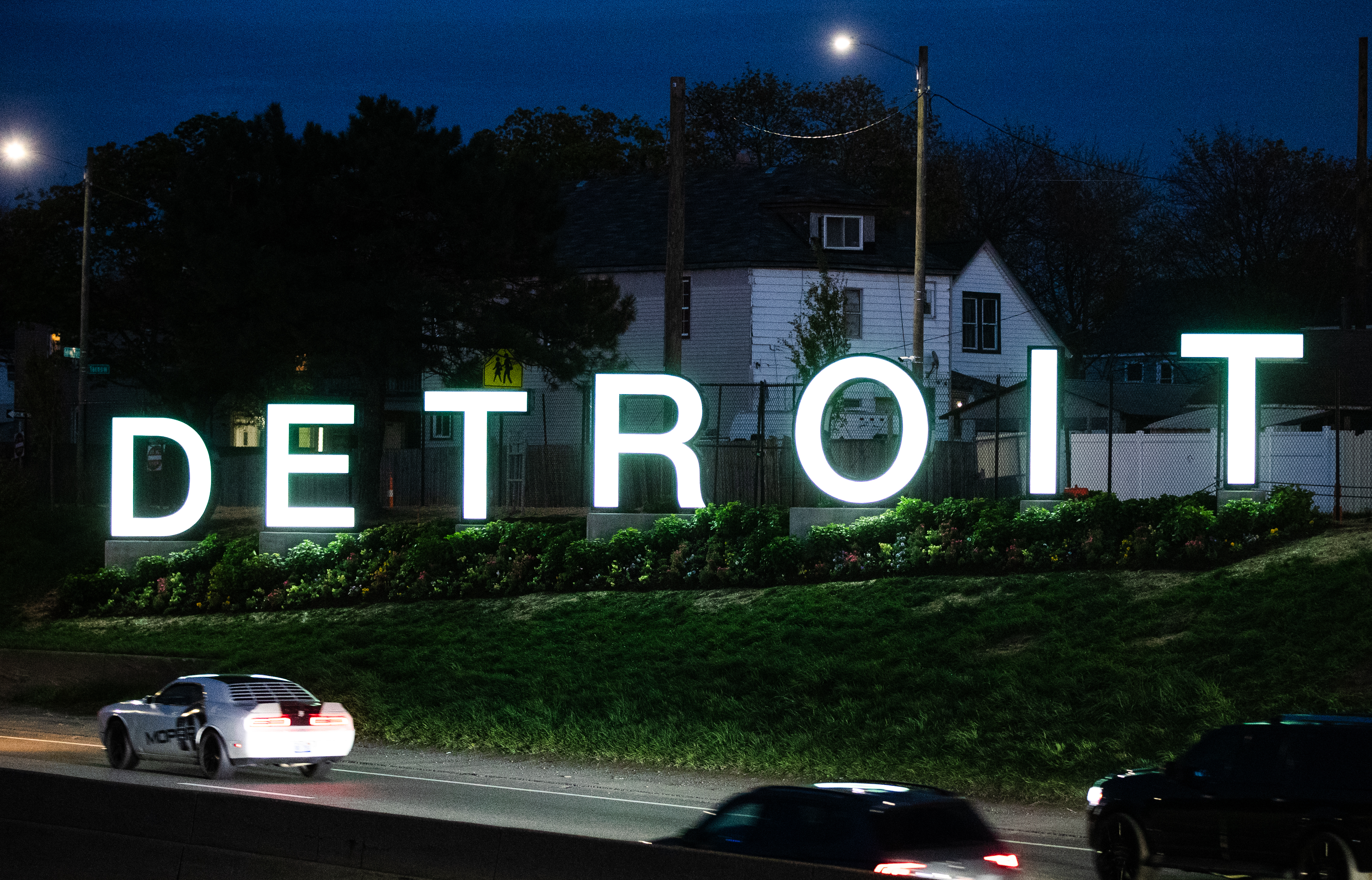
The Detroit Sign was installed in advance of the draft

== Player selections ==
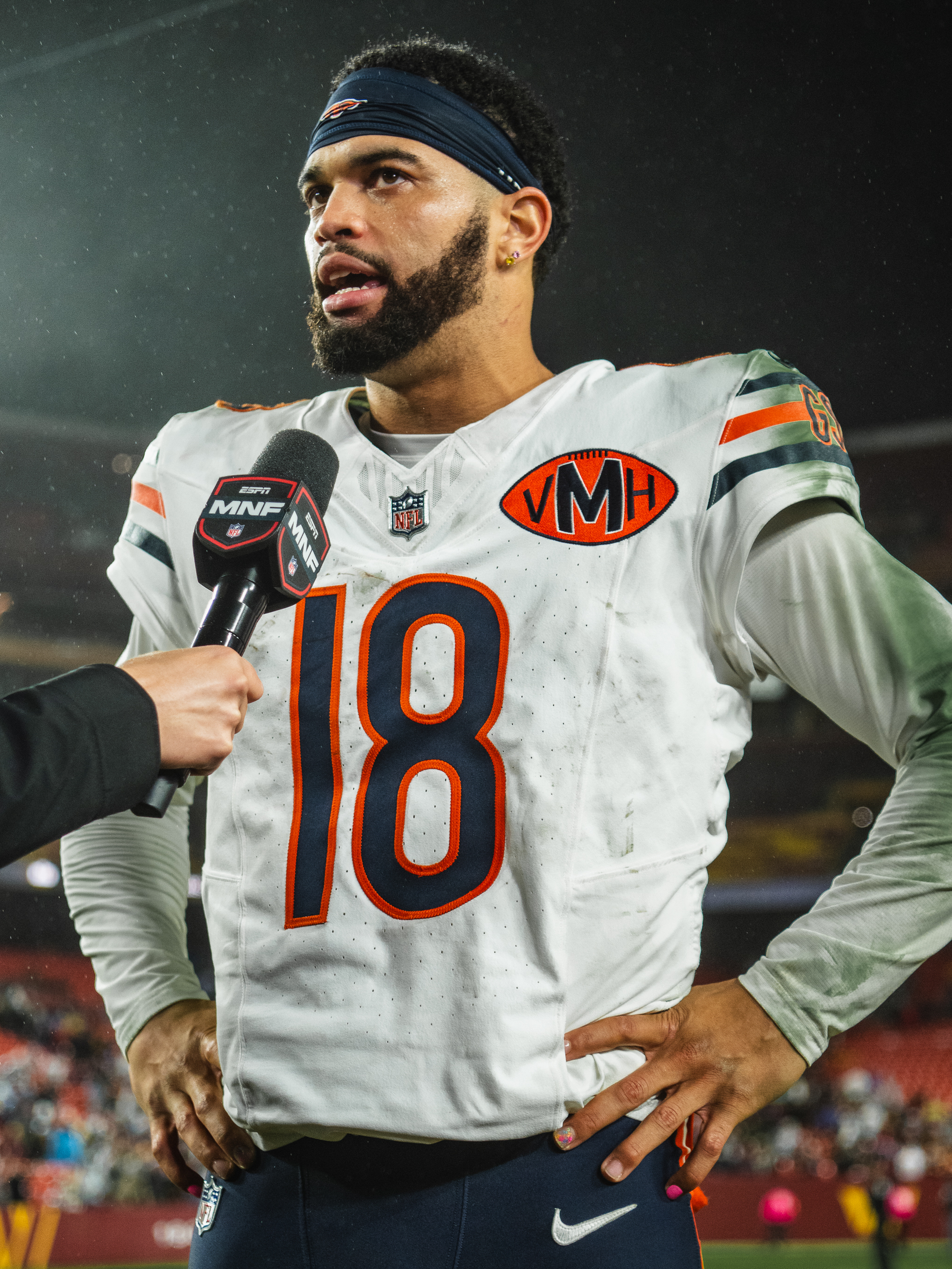
- Caleb Williams
- #1 overall

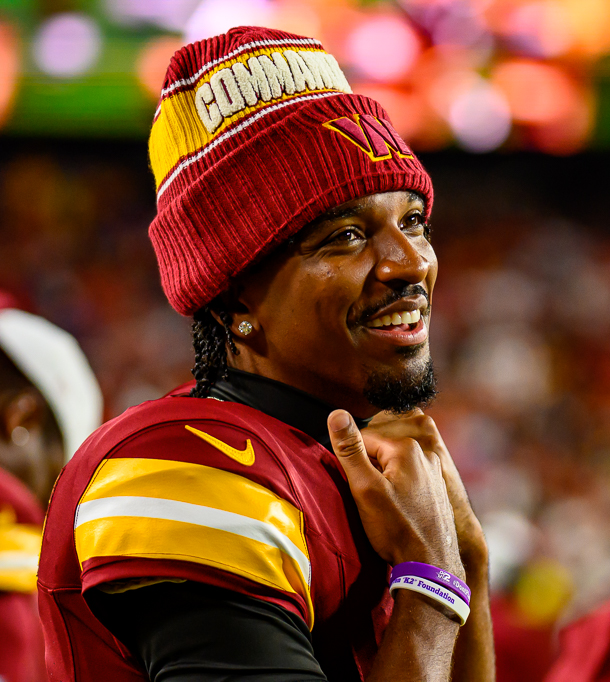
- Jayden Daniels
- #2 overall

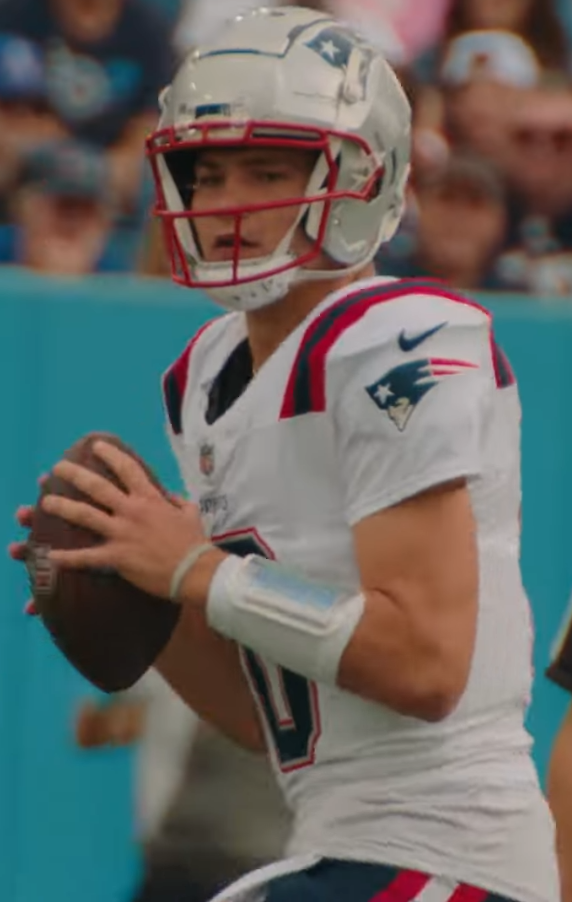
- Drake Maye
- #3 overall

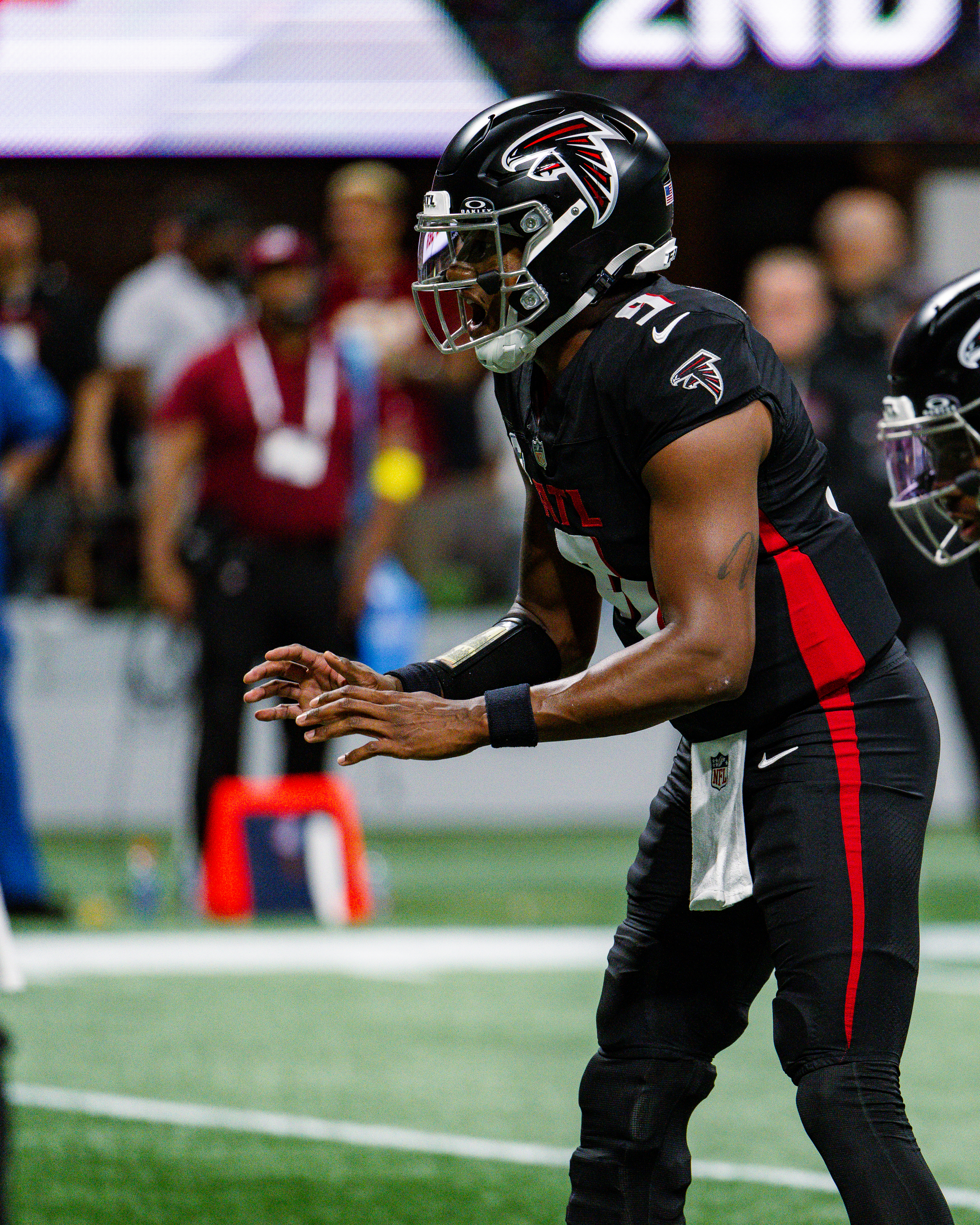
- Michael Penix Jr.
- #8 overall

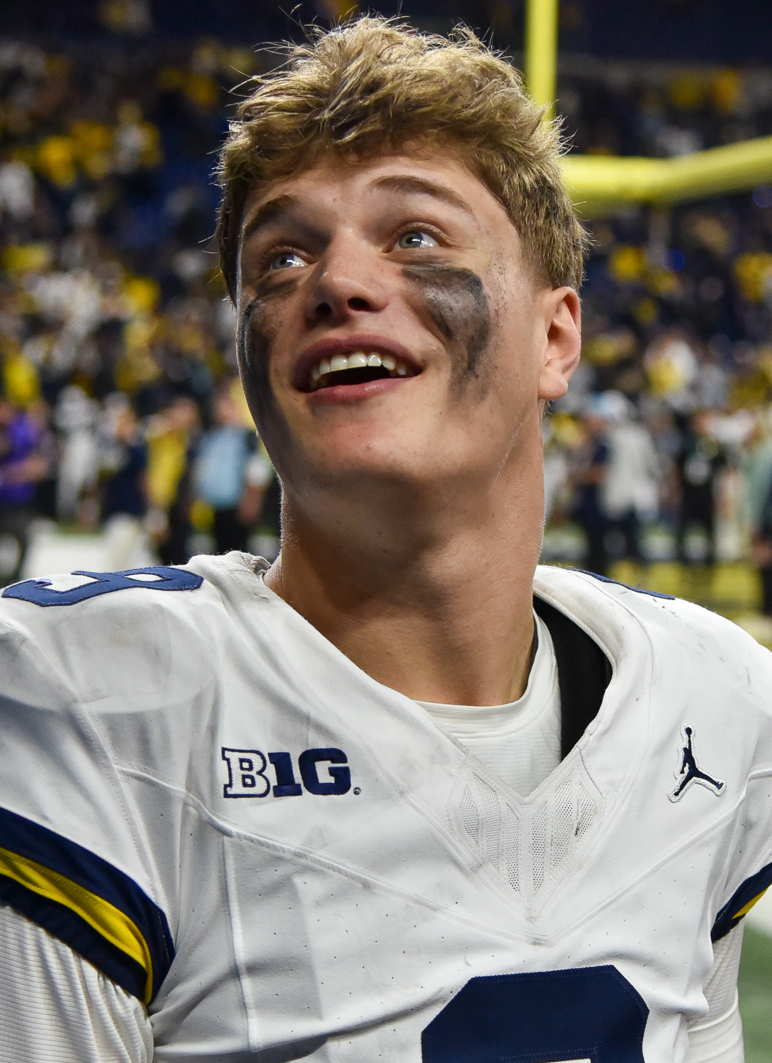
- J. J. McCarthy
- #10 overall

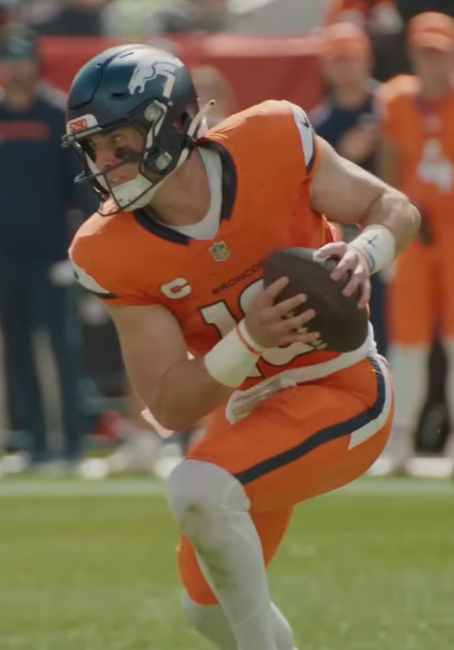
- Bo Nix
- #12 overall

Six quarterbacks were selected in the first round, tying the 1983 draft for the most all-time.

*	compensatory selection
×	Resolution JC-2A selection
†	Pro Bowler (Note: Players are identified as Pro Bowlers if they were selected for the Pro Bowl at any time in their career.)

Positions key
Offense	Defense	Special teams
QB — Quarterback; RB — Running back; FB — Fullback; WR — Wide receiver; TE — Tight end; OL — Offensive lineman; T — Tackle; G — Guard; C — Center	DL — Defensive lineman; DT — Defensive tackle (Note: Includes nose tackle (NT)); DE — Defensive end; EDGE — Edge rusher; LB — Linebacker (Note: Includes middle linebacker (MLB/MIKE), weakside linebacker (WILL), strongside linebacker (SAM), off-ball linebacker, and outside linebacker (OLB)); DB — Defensive back; CB — Cornerback; S — Safety (Note: Includes free safety (FS) and strong safety (SS))	K — Kicker (Note: Also known as a placekicker (PK)); P — Punter; LS — Long snapper; RS — Return specialist (Note: Includes kickoff and punt returners)

Rnd.	Pick	Team	Player	Pos.	College	Notes
1	1	Chicago Bears	Caleb Williams	QB	USC	2022 Heisman Trophy winner; from Carolina (Note: No. 1: Carolina → Chicago (PD). Carolina traded a first-round selection (1st overall), 2023 first- and second-round selections (9th and 61st overall), a 2025 second-round selection and WR D. J. Moore to Chicago in exchange for a 2023 first-round selection (1st overall).)
1	2	Washington Commanders	Jayden Daniels ^{†}	QB	LSU	2023 Heisman Trophy winner
1	3	New England Patriots	Drake Maye ^{†}	QB	North Carolina	2022 ACC Player of the Year winner
1	4	Arizona Cardinals	Marvin Harrison Jr.	WR	Ohio State	2023 Fred Biletnikoff Award winner
1	5	Los Angeles Chargers	Joe Alt ^{†}	T	Notre Dame	
1	6	New York Giants	Malik Nabers ^{†}	WR	LSU	
1	7	Tennessee Titans	JC Latham	T	Alabama	
1	8	Atlanta Falcons	Michael Penix Jr.	QB	Washington	2023 Maxwell Award winner
1	9	Chicago Bears	Rome Odunze	WR	Washington	
1	10	Minnesota Vikings	J. J. McCarthy	QB	Michigan	from NY Jets (Note: No. 10: NY Jets → Minnesota (D). NY Jets traded first- and sixth-round selections (10th and 203rd overall) to Minnesota in exchange for first-, fourth- and fifth-round selections (11th, 129th and 157th overall).)
1	11	New York Jets	Olu Fashanu	T	Penn State	from Minnesota (Note: No. 11: Minnesota → NY Jets (D). See Round 1: NY Jets → Minnesota.)
1	12	Denver Broncos	Bo Nix	QB	Oregon	
1	13	Las Vegas Raiders	Brock Bowers ^{†}	TE	Georgia	2022 and 2023 John Mackey Award winner
1	14	New Orleans Saints	Taliese Fuaga	T	Oregon State	
1	15	Indianapolis Colts	Laiatu Latu	DE	UCLA	
1	16	Seattle Seahawks	Byron Murphy II	DT	Texas	
1	17	Minnesota Vikings	Dallas Turner	DE	Alabama	from Jacksonville (Note: No. 17: Jacksonville → Minnesota (D). Jacksonville traded a first-round selection (17th overall) to Minnesota in exchange for first- and fifth-round selections (23rd and 167th overall) and 2025 third and fourth-round selections.)
1	18	Cincinnati Bengals	Amarius Mims	T	Georgia	
1	19	Los Angeles Rams	Jared Verse ^{†}	DE	Florida State	
1	20	Pittsburgh Steelers	Troy Fautanu	T	Washington	
1	21	Miami Dolphins	Chop Robinson	DE	Penn State	
1	22	Philadelphia Eagles	Quinyon Mitchell ^{†}	CB	Toledo	
1	23	Jacksonville Jaguars	Brian Thomas Jr. ^{†}	WR	LSU	from Cleveland via Houston and Minnesota (Note: No. 23: Cleveland → Houston → Minnesota → Jacksonville. Multiple trades: Cleveland → Houston (PD). Cleveland traded first- and fourth-round selections, 2022 first- and fourth-round selections (13th and 107th overall), and 2023 first- and third-round selections (12th and 73rd overall) to Houston in exchange for a sixth-round selection (203rd overall) and QB Deshaun Watson. Houston → Minnesota (PD). Houston traded first- and seventh-round selections (23rd and 232nd overall) to Minnesota in exchange for second- and sixth-round selections (42nd and 188th overall) as well as a 2025 second-round selection. Minnesota → Jacksonville (D). See Round 1: Jacksonville → Minnesota.)
1	24	Detroit Lions	Terrion Arnold	CB	Alabama	from Dallas (Note: No. 24: Dallas → Detroit (D). Dallas traded a first-round selection (24th overall) and a 2025 seventh-round selection to Detroit in exchange for first- and third-round selections (29th and 73rd overall).)
1	25	Green Bay Packers	Jordan Morgan	T	Arizona	
1	26	Tampa Bay Buccaneers	Graham Barton	C	Duke	
1	27	Arizona Cardinals	Darius Robinson	DE	Missouri	from Houston (Note: No. 27: Houston → Arizona (PD). Houston traded first- and third-round selections (27th and 90th overall), and 2023 first- and second-round selections (12th and 33rd overall) to Arizona in exchange for 2023 first- and fourth-round selections (3rd and 105th overall).)
1	28	Kansas City Chiefs	Xavier Worthy	WR	Texas	from Buffalo (Note: No. 28: Buffalo → Kansas City (D). Buffalo traded first-, fourth- and seventh-round selections (28th, 133rd and 248th overall) to Kansas City in exchange for first-, third- and seventh-round selections (32nd, 95th and 221st overall).)
1	29	Dallas Cowboys	Tyler Guyton	T	Oklahoma	from Detroit (Note: No. 29: Detroit → Dallas (D). See Round 1: Dallas → Detroit.)
1	30	Baltimore Ravens	Nate Wiggins	CB	Clemson	
1	31	San Francisco 49ers	Ricky Pearsall	WR	Florida	
1	32	Carolina Panthers	Xavier Legette	WR	South Carolina	from Kansas City via Buffalo (Note: No. 32: Kansas City → Buffalo → Carolina. Multiple trades: Kansas City → Buffalo (D). See Round 1: Buffalo → Kansas City. Buffalo → Carolina (D). Buffalo traded first- and sixth-round selections (32nd and 200th overall) to Carolina in exchange for second- and fifth-round selections (33rd and 141st overall).)
2	33	Buffalo Bills	Keon Coleman	WR	Florida State	from Carolina (Note: No. 33: Carolina → Buffalo (D). See Round 1: Buffalo → Carolina.)
2	34	Los Angeles Chargers	Ladd McConkey	WR	Georgia	from New England (Note: No. 34: New England → LA Chargers (D). New England traded second- and fifth-round selections (34th and 137th overall) to LA Chargers in exchange for second- and fourth-round selections (37th and 110th overall).)
2	35	Atlanta Falcons	Ruke Orhorhoro	DT	Clemson	from Arizona (Note: No. 35: Arizona → Atlanta (D). Arizona traded second- and sixth-round selections (35th and 186th overall) to Atlanta in exchange for second- and third-round selections (43rd and 79th overall).)
2	36	Washington Commanders	Jer'Zhan Newton	DT	Illinois	
2	37	New England Patriots	Ja'Lynn Polk	WR	Washington	from LA Chargers (Note: No. 37: LA Chargers → New England (D). See Round 2: New England → LA Chargers.)
2	38	Tennessee Titans	T'Vondre Sweat	DT	Texas	2023 Outland Trophy winner
2	39	Los Angeles Rams	Braden Fiske	DT	Florida State	from NY Giants via Carolina (Note: No. 39: NY Giants → Carolina → LA Rams. Multiple trades: NY Giants → Carolina (PD). NY Giants traded second- and fifth-round selections (39th and 141st overall) and a 2025 conditional fifth-round selection to Carolina in exchange for a fifth-round selection (166th overall) and LB Brian Burns. Carolina → LA Rams (D). Carolina traded a second-round selection (39th overall) to LA Rams in exchange for second- and fifth-round selections (52nd and 155th overall) and a 2025 second-round selection.)
2	40	Philadelphia Eagles	Cooper DeJean ^{†}	CB	Iowa	from Chicago via Washington (Note: No. 40: Chicago → Washington → Philadelphia. Multiple trades: Chicago → Washington (PD). Chicago traded a second-round selection (40th overall) to Washington in exchange for DE Montez Sweat. Washington → Philadelphia (D). Washington traded second-, third- and fifth-round selections (40th, 78th, and 152nd overall) to Philadelphia in exchange for two second-round selections and a fifth-round selection (50th, 53rd and 161st overall).)
2	41	New Orleans Saints	Kool-Aid McKinstry	CB	Alabama	from NY Jets via Green Bay (Note: No. 41: NY Jets → Green Bay → New Orleans. Multiple trades: NY Jets → Green Bay (PD). NY Jets traded a second-round selection (41st overall), 2023 first-, second- and sixth-round selections (13th, 42nd and 207th overall) to Green Bay in exchange for 2023 first and fifth-round selections (15th and 170th overall) and QB Aaron Rodgers. Green Bay → New Orleans (D). Green Bay traded a second-round selection (41st overall) to New Orleans in exchange for second-, fifth- and sixth-round selections (45th, 168th and 190th overall).)
2	42	Houston Texans	Kamari Lassiter ^{†}	CB	Georgia	from Minnesota (Note: No. 42: Minnesota → Houston (PD). See Round 1: Houston → Minnesota.)
2	43	Arizona Cardinals	Max Melton	CB	Rutgers	from Atlanta (Note: No. 43: Atlanta → Arizona (D). See Round 2: Arizona → Atlanta.)
2	44	Las Vegas Raiders	Jackson Powers-Johnson	G	Oregon	2023 Rimington Trophy winner
2	45	Green Bay Packers	Edgerrin Cooper	LB	Texas A&M	from Denver via New Orleans (Note: No. 45: Denver → New Orleans → Green Bay. Multiple trades: Denver → New Orleans (PD). Denver traded a second-round selection (45th overall) and a 2023 first-round selection (29th overall) to New Orleans in exchange for a third-round selection (81st overall) and the coaching rights to Sean Payton. New Orleans → Green Bay (D). See Round 2: Green Bay → New Orleans.)
2	46	Carolina Panthers	Jonathon Brooks	RB	Texas	from Indianapolis (Note: No. 46: Indianapolis → Carolina (D). Indianapolis traded a second-round selection (46th overall) to Carolina in exchange for a second-round selection and two fifth-round selections (52nd, 142nd and 155th overall).)
2	47	New York Giants	Tyler Nubin	S	Minnesota	from Seattle (Note: No. 47: Seattle → NY Giants (PD). Seattle traded a second-round selection (47th overall) and a 2025 fifth-round selection to NY Giants in exchange for DL Leonard Williams.)
2	48	Jacksonville Jaguars	Maason Smith	DT	LSU	
2	49	Cincinnati Bengals	Kris Jenkins Jr.	DT	Michigan	
2	50	Washington Commanders	Mike Sainristil	CB	Michigan	from New Orleans via Philadelphia (Note: No. 50: New Orleans → Philadelphia → Washington. Multiple trades: New Orleans → Philadelphia (PD). New Orleans traded a second-round selection (50th overall), 2022 first, third- and seventh-round selections (18th, 101st and 237th overall), and a 2023 first-round selection (10th overall) to Philadelphia in exchange for two 2022 first-round selections (16th and 19th overall) and a 2023 sixth-round selection (194th overall). Philadelphia → Washington (D). See Round 2: Washington → Philadelphia.)
2	51	Pittsburgh Steelers	Zach Frazier	C	West Virginia	
2	52	Indianapolis Colts	Adonai Mitchell	WR	Texas	from LA Rams via Carolina (Note: No. 52: LA Rams → Carolina → Indianapolis. Multiple trades: LA Rams → Carolina (D). See Round 2: Carolina → LA Rams. Carolina → Indianapolis (D). See Round 2: Indianapolis → Carolina.)
2	53	Washington Commanders	Ben Sinnott	TE	Kansas State	from Philadelphia (Note: No. 53: Philadelphia → Washington (D). See Round 2: Washington → Philadelphia.)
2	54	Cleveland Browns	Mike Hall Jr.	DT	Ohio State	
2	55	Miami Dolphins	Patrick Paul	T	Houston	
2	56	Dallas Cowboys	Marshawn Kneeland	DE	Western Michigan	
2	57	Tampa Bay Buccaneers	Chris Braswell	DE	Alabama	
2	58	Green Bay Packers	Javon Bullard	S	Georgia	
2	59	Houston Texans	Blake Fisher	T	Notre Dame	
2	60	Buffalo Bills	Cole Bishop	S	Utah	
2	61	Detroit Lions	Ennis Rakestraw Jr.	CB	Missouri	
2	62	Baltimore Ravens	Roger Rosengarten	T	Washington	
2	63	Kansas City Chiefs	Kingsley Suamataia	T	BYU	from San Francisco (Note: No. 63: San Francisco → Kansas City (D). San Francisco traded second- and sixth-round selections (63rd and 211th overall) to Kansas City in exchange for the Chiefs' second- and fifth-round selections (64th and 173rd overall).)
2	64	San Francisco 49ers	Renardo Green	CB	Florida State	from Kansas City (Note: No. 64: Kansas City → San Francisco (D). See Round 2: San Francisco → Kansas City.)
3	65	New York Jets	Malachi Corley	WR	Western Kentucky	from Carolina (Note: No. 65: Carolina → NY Jets (D). Carolina traded a third-round selection (65th overall) to NY Jets in exchange for third- and fifth-round selections (72nd and 157th overall).)
3	66	Arizona Cardinals	Trey Benson	RB	Florida State	
3	67	Washington Commanders	Brandon Coleman	T	TCU	
3	68	New England Patriots	Caedan Wallace	T	Penn State	
3	69	Los Angeles Chargers	Junior Colson	LB	Michigan	2023 Lott Trophy winner
3	70	New York Giants	Andru Phillips	CB	Kentucky	
3	71	Arizona Cardinals	Isaiah Adams	G	Illinois	from Tennessee (Note: No. 71: Tennessee → Arizona (PD). Tennessee traded a third-round selection (71st overall), and 2023 second- and third-round selections (41st and 72nd overall) to Arizona in exchange for 2023 second and third-round selections (33rd and 81st overall))
3	72	Carolina Panthers	Trevin Wallace	LB	Kentucky	from NY Jets (Note: No. 72: NY Jets → Carolina (D). See Round 3: Carolina → NY Jets.)
3	73	Dallas Cowboys	Cooper Beebe	G	Kansas State	from Minnesota via Detroit (Note: No. 73: Minnesota → Detroit → Dallas. Multiple trades: Minnesota → Detroit (PD). Minnesota traded a third-round selection and a 2023 second-round selection to Detroit in exchange for a conditional fourth-round selection (that would have downgraded to a fifth if the Vikings won a playoff game in 2022), a 2023 fourth-round selection and TE T. J. Hockenson. Detroit → Dallas (D). See Round 1: Dallas → Detroit.)
3	74	Atlanta Falcons	Bralen Trice	OLB	Washington	
3	75	Chicago Bears	Kiran Amegadjie	T	Yale	
3	76	Denver Broncos	Jonah Elliss	DE	Utah	
3	77	Las Vegas Raiders	DJ Glaze	T	Maryland	
3	78	Houston Texans	Calen Bullock ^{†}	S	USC	from Seattle via Washington and Philadelphia (Note: No. 78: Seattle → Washington → Philadelphia → Houston. Multiple trades: Seattle → Washington (PD). Seattle traded third- and fifth-round selections (78th and 152nd overall) to Washington in exchange for fourth- and sixth-round selections (102nd and 179th overall), and QB Sam Howell. Washington → Philadelphia (D). See Round 2: Washington → Philadelphia. Philadelphia → Houston (D) Philadelphia traded a third-round selection (78th overall) to Houston in exchange for third- and fourth-round selections (86th and 123rd overall).)
3	79	Indianapolis Colts	Matt Goncalves	T	Pittsburgh	from Jacksonville via Atlanta and Arizona (Note: No. 79: Jacksonville → Atlanta → Arizona → Indianapolis. Multiple trades: Jacksonville → Atlanta (PD). Jacksonville traded a third-round selection (79th overall) and a 2023 fifth-round selection (159th overall) to Atlanta in exchange for WR Calvin Ridley. Atlanta → Arizona (D). See Round 2: Arizona → Atlanta. Arizona → Indianapolis (D). Arizona traded a third-round selection (79th overall) to Indianapolis in exchange for third- and sixth-round selections (82nd and 191st overall).)
3	80	Cincinnati Bengals	Jermaine Burton	WR	Alabama	
3	81	Seattle Seahawks	Christian Haynes	G	UConn	from New Orleans via Denver (Note: No. 81: New Orleans → Denver → Seattle. Multiple trades: New Orleans → Denver (PD). See Round 2: New Orleans → Denver. Denver → Seattle (PD). Denver traded a third-round selection (81st overall) and a 2023 fourth-round selection (108th overall) to Seattle in exchange for a 2023 third-round selection (83rd overall).)
3	82	Arizona Cardinals	Tip Reiman	TE	Illinois	from Indianapolis (Note: No. 82: Indianapolis → Arizona (D). See Round 3: Arizona → Indianapolis.)
3	83	Los Angeles Rams	Blake Corum	RB	Michigan	
3	84	Pittsburgh Steelers	Roman Wilson	WR	Michigan	
3	85	Cleveland Browns	Zak Zinter	G	Michigan	
3	–	Miami Dolphins	Selection forfeited (Note: Miami forfeited a third-round selection as well as a 2023 first-round selection for violating the anti-tampering policy in conversations with QB Tom Brady and the agent for then-New Orleans Saints' coach Sean Payton.)			
3	86	San Francisco 49ers	Dominick Puni	G	Kansas	from Philadelphia via Houston and Philadelphia (Note: No. 86: Philadelphia → Houston → Philadelphia → San Francisco. Multiple trades: Philadelphia → Houston (PD). Philadelphia traded a third-round selection (86th overall) to Houston in exchange for the a 2023 fourth-round selection (105th overall). Houston → Philadelphia (D). See Round 3: Philadelphia → Houston. Philadelphia → San Francisco (D). Philadelphia traded a third-round selection (86th overall) to San Francisco in exchange for third- and fourth-round selections (94th and 132nd overall).)
3	87	Dallas Cowboys	Marist Liufau	LB	Notre Dame	
3	88	Green Bay Packers	MarShawn Lloyd	RB	USC	
3	89	Tampa Bay Buccaneers	Tykee Smith	S	Georgia	
3	90	Arizona Cardinals	Elijah Jones	CB	Boston College	from Houston (Note: No. 90: Houston → Arizona (PD). See Round 1: Houston → Arizona.)
3	91	Green Bay Packers	Ty'Ron Hopper	LB	Missouri	from Buffalo (Note: No. 91: Buffalo → Green Bay (PD). Buffalo traded a third-round selection (91st overall) to Green Bay in exchange for a fifth-round selection (160th overall) and CB Rasul Douglas.)
3	92	Tampa Bay Buccaneers	Jalen McMillan	WR	Washington	from Detroit (Note: No. 92: Detroit → Tampa Bay (PD). Detroit traded a third-round selection (92nd overall) to Tampa Bay in exchange for a sixth-round selection (201st overall), a 2025 sixth-round selection and CB Carlton Davis.)
3	93	Baltimore Ravens	Adisa Isaac	DE	Penn State	
3	94	Philadelphia Eagles	Jalyx Hunt	DE	Houston Christian	from San Francisco (Note: No. 94: San Francisco → Philadelphia (D). See Round 3: Philadelphia → San Francisco.)
3	95	Buffalo Bills	DeWayne Carter	DT	Duke	from Kansas City (Note: No. 95: Kansas City → Buffalo (D). See Round 1: Buffalo → Kansas City.)
3*	96	Jacksonville Jaguars	Jarrian Jones	CB	Florida State	
3*	97	Cincinnati Bengals	McKinnley Jackson	DT	Texas A&M	
3*	98	Pittsburgh Steelers	Payton Wilson	LB	NC State	2023 Chuck Bednarik Award winner; from Philadelphia (Note: No. 98: Philadelphia → Pittsburgh (PD). Philadelphia traded a third-round selection (98th overall) and two 2025 seventh-round selections to Pittsburgh in exchange for a fourth-round selection (120th overall) and QB Kenny Pickett.)
3×	99	Los Angeles Rams	Kamren Kinchens	S	Miami (FL)	Resolution JC-2A selection (Note: The LA Rams received a third-round selection (99th overall) and a 2025 third-round selection as compensation for Atlanta hiring defensive coordinator Raheem Morris as head coach.)
3×	100	Washington Commanders	Luke McCaffrey	WR	Rice	Resolution JC-2A selection; (Note: San Francisco received a third-round selection (100th overall) and a 2023 third-round selection as compensation for Tennessee hiring director of player personnel Ran Carthon as general manager.) from San Francisco (Note: No. 100: San Francisco → Washington (PD). San Francisco traded a third-round selection (100th overall) to Washington in exchange for DE Chase Young.)
4	101	Carolina Panthers	Ja'Tavion Sanders	TE	Texas	
4	102	Denver Broncos	Troy Franklin	WR	Oregon	from Washington via Seattle (Note: No. 102: Washington → Seattle → Denver. Multiple trades: Washington → Seattle (PD). See Round 3: Seattle → Washington. Seattle → Denver (D). Seattle traded fourth- and seventh-round selections (102 and 235th overall) to Denver in exchange for fourth-, fifth- and sixth-round selections (121st, 136th and 207th overall).)
4	103	New England Patriots	Layden Robinson	G	Texas A&M	
4	104	Arizona Cardinals	Dadrion Taylor-Demerson	S	Texas Tech	
4	105	Los Angeles Chargers	Justin Eboigbe	DT	Alabama	
4	106	Tennessee Titans	Cedric Gray	LB	North Carolina	
4	107	New York Giants	Theo Johnson	TE	Penn State	
4	108	Minnesota Vikings	Khyree Jackson	CB	Oregon	
4	109	Atlanta Falcons	Brandon Dorlus	DT	Oregon	
4	110	New England Patriots	Javon Baker	WR	UCF	from Chicago via LA Chargers (Note: No. 110: Chicago → LA Chargers → New England. Multiple trades: Chicago → LA Chargers (PD). Chicago traded a fourth-round selection (110th overall) to LA Chargers in exchange for WR Keenan Allen. LA Chargers → New England (D). See Round 2: New England → LA Chargers.)
4	111	Green Bay Packers	Evan Williams	S	Oregon	from NY Jets (Note: No. 111: NY Jets → Green Bay (D). NY Jets traded a fourth-round selection (111th overall) to Green Bay in exchange for fourth- and sixth-round selections (126th and 190th overall).)
4	112	Las Vegas Raiders	Decamerion Richardson	CB	Mississippi State	
4	113	Baltimore Ravens	Devontez Walker	WR	North Carolina	from Denver via NY Jets (Note: No. 113: Denver → NY Jets → Baltimore. Multiple trades: Denver → NY Jets (PD). Denver traded a fourth-round selection (113th overall) to NY Jets in exchange for a fifth-round selection (145th overall) and DE Jacob Martin. NY Jets → Baltimore (PD). NY Jets traded a fourth-round selection (113th overall) and a sixth-round selection (218th overall) to Baltimore in exchange for a fourth-round selection (134th overall) and OT Morgan Moses.)
4	114	Jacksonville Jaguars	Javon Foster	T	Missouri	
4	115	Cincinnati Bengals	Erick All	TE	Iowa	
4	116	Jacksonville Jaguars	Jordan Jefferson	DT	LSU	from New Orleans (Note: No. 116: New Orleans → Jacksonville (PD). New Orleans traded a fourth-round selection (116th overall) and a 2023 seventh-round selection (227th overall) to Jacksonville in exchange for a 2023 fourth-round selection (127th overall).)
4	117	Indianapolis Colts	Tanor Bortolini	C	Wisconsin	
4	118	Seattle Seahawks	Tyrice Knight	LB	UTEP	
4	119	Pittsburgh Steelers	Mason McCormick	G	South Dakota State	
4	120	Miami Dolphins	Jaylen Wright	RB	Tennessee	from LA Rams via Pittsburgh and Philadelphia (Note: No. 120: LA Rams → Pittsburgh → Philadelphia → Miami. Multiple trades: LA Rams → Pittsburgh (PD). LA Rams traded a fourth-round selection (120th overall) and 2025 fifth-round selection to Pittsburgh in exchange for a fifth-round selection (155th overall), a 2025 sixth-round selection and G Kevin Dotson. Pittsburgh → Philadelphia (PD). See Round 3: Philadelphia → Pittsburgh. Philadelphia → Miami (D). Philadelphia traded a fourth-round selection (120th overall) to Miami in exchange for a 2025 third-round selection.)
4	121	Seattle Seahawks	AJ Barner	TE	Michigan	from Miami via Denver (Note: No. 121: Miami → Denver → Seattle. Multiple trades: Miami → Denver (PD). Miami traded a fourth-round selection (121st overall), a 2023 first-round selection (29th overall) and RB Chase Edmonds to Denver in exchange for a 2025 fifth-round selection and DE Bradley Chubb. Denver → Seattle (D). See Round 4: Seattle → Denver.)
4	122	Chicago Bears	Tory Taylor	P	Iowa	2023 Ray Guy Award winner; from Philadelphia (Note: No. 122: Philadelphia → Chicago (PD). Philadelphia traded a fourth-round selection (122nd overall) and a 2023 first-round selection (10th overall) to Chicago in exchange for a 2023 first-round selection (9th overall).)
4	123	Houston Texans	Cade Stover	TE	Ohio State	from Cleveland via Houston and Philadelphia (Note: No. 123: Cleveland → Houston → Philadelphia → Houston. Multiple trades: Cleveland → Houston (PD). See Round 1: Cleveland → Houston. Houston → Philadelphia (D) See Round 3: #PHIHOUTrade. Philadelphia → Houston (D) Philadelphia traded a fourth-round selection (123rd overall) to Houston in exchange for a fourth-round selection (127th overall) and a 2025 fifth-round selection.)
4	124	San Francisco 49ers	Malik Mustapha	S	Wake Forest	from Dallas (Note: No. 124: Dallas → San Francisco (PD). Dallas traded a fourth-round selection (124th overall) to San Francisco in exchange for QB Trey Lance.)
4	125	Tampa Bay Buccaneers	Bucky Irving	RB	Oregon	
4	126	Detroit Lions	Giovanni Manu	T	British Columbia	from Green Bay via NY Jets (Note: No. 126: Green Bay → NY Jets → Detroit. Multiple trades: Green Bay → NY Jets (D). See Round 4: NY Jets → Green Bay. NY Jets → Detroit (D) NY Jets traded a fourth-round selection (126th overall) to Detroit in exchange for a 2025 third-round selection.)
4	127	Philadelphia Eagles	Will Shipley	RB	Clemson	from Houston (Note: No. 127: Houston → Philadelphia (D). See Round 4: Philadelphia → Houston.)
4	128	Buffalo Bills	Ray Davis	RB	Kentucky	
4	129	San Francisco 49ers	Isaac Guerendo	RB	Louisville	from Detroit via Minnesota and NY Jets (Note: No. 129: Detroit → Minnesota → NY Jets → San Francisco. Multiple trades: Detroit → Minnesota (PD). See Round 3: Minnesota → Detroit. Minnesota → NY Jets (D). See Round 1: NY Jets → Minnesota. NY Jets → San Francisco (D) NY Jets traded a fourth-round selection (129th overall) to San Francisco in exchange for two fifth-round selections (173rd and 176th overall).)
4	130	Baltimore Ravens	T. J. Tampa	CB	Iowa State	
4	131	Kansas City Chiefs	Jared Wiley	TE	TCU	
4*	132	Detroit Lions	Sione Vaki	RB	Utah	from San Francisco via Philadelphia (Note: No. 132: San Francisco → Philadelphia → Detroit. Multiple trades: San Francisco → Philadelphia (D). See Round 3: Philadelphia → San Francisco. Philadelphia → Detroit (D) Philadelphia traded fourth- and sixth-round selections (132nd and 210th overall) to Detroit in exchange for fifth- and sixth-round selections (164th and 201st overall), and a 2025 fourth-round selection.)
4*	133	Kansas City Chiefs	Jaden Hicks	S	Washington State	from Buffalo (Note: No. 133: Buffalo → Kansas City (D). See Round 1: Buffalo → Kansas City.)
4*	134	New York Jets	Braelon Allen	RB	Wisconsin	from Baltimore (Note: No. 134: Baltimore → NY Jets (PD). See Round 4: NY Jets → Baltimore.)
4	135	San Francisco 49ers	Jacob Cowing	WR	Arizona	Selection moved (Note: San Francisco had a fourth-round selection (131st overall) moved to the end of the round (135th overall) as punishment for administrative payroll accounting errors.)
5	136	Seattle Seahawks	Nehemiah Pritchett	CB	Auburn	from Carolina via Cleveland and Denver (Note: No. 136: Carolina → Cleveland → Denver → Seattle. Multiple trades: Carolina → Cleveland (PD). Carolina traded a fifth-round selection (136th overall) to Cleveland in exchange for QB Baker Mayfield. Cleveland → Denver (PD). Cleveland traded fifth- and sixth-round selections (136th and 203rd overall) to Denver in exchange for WR Jerry Jeudy. Denver → Seattle (D). See Round 4: Seattle → Denver.)
5	137	Los Angeles Chargers	Tarheeb Still	CB	Maryland	from New England (Note: No. 137: New England → LA Chargers (D). See Round 2: New England → LA Chargers.)
5	138	Arizona Cardinals	Xavier Thomas	DE	Clemson	
5	139	Washington Commanders	Jordan Magee	LB	Temple	
5	140	Los Angeles Chargers	Cam Hart	CB	Notre Dame	
5	141	Buffalo Bills	Sedrick Van Pran-Granger	C	Georgia	from NY Giants via Carolina (Note: No. 141: NY Giants → Carolina → Buffalo. Multiple trades: NY Giants → Carolina (PD). See Round 2: NY Giants → Carolina. Carolina → Buffalo (D). See Round 1: Buffalo → Carolina.)
5	142	Indianapolis Colts	Anthony Gould	WR	Oregon State	from Tennessee via Carolina (Note: No. 142: Tennessee → Carolina → Indianapolis. Multiple trades: Tennessee → Carolina (PD). Tennessee traded a fifth-round selection (142nd overall) to Carolina in exchange for a seventh-round selection (221st overall) and OT Dennis Daley. Carolina → Indianapolis (D). See Round 2: Indianapolis → Carolina.)
5	143	Atlanta Falcons	JD Bertrand	LB	Notre Dame	
5	144	Chicago Bears	Austin Booker	DE	Kansas	from Chicago via Buffalo (Note: No. 144: Chicago → Buffalo → Chicago. Multiple trades: Chicago → Buffalo (PD). Chicago traded a fifth-round selection (144th overall) to Buffalo in exchange for G/C Ryan Bates. Buffalo → Chicago (D). Buffalo traded a fifth-round selection (144th overall) to Chicago in exchange for a 2025 fourth-round selection.)
5	145	Denver Broncos	Kris Abrams-Draine	CB	Missouri	from NY Jets (Note: No. 145: NY Jets → Denver (PD). See Round 4: Denver → NY Jets.)
5	146	Tennessee Titans	Jarvis Brownlee Jr.	CB	Louisville	from Minnesota via Philadelphia (Note: No. 146: Minnesota → Philadelphia → Tennessee. Multiple trades: Minnesota → Philadelphia (PD). Minnesota traded a fifth-round selection (146th overall) and a 2023 seventh-round selection (219th overall) to Philadelphia in exchange for WR Jalen Reagor. Philadelphia → Tennessee (PD). Philadelphia traded fifth- and sixth-round selections (146th and 182nd overall) and S Terrell Edmunds to Tennessee in exchange for S Kevin Byard.)
5	147	Denver Broncos	Audric Estimé	RB	Notre Dame	
5	148	Las Vegas Raiders	Tommy Eichenberg	LB	Ohio State	
5	149	Cincinnati Bengals	Josh Newton	CB	TCU	
5	150	New Orleans Saints	Spencer Rattler	QB	South Carolina	
5	151	Indianapolis Colts	Jaylon Carlies	S	Missouri	
5	152	Philadelphia Eagles	Ainias Smith	WR	Texas A&M	from Seattle via Washington (Note: No. 152: Seattle → Washington → Philadelphia. Multiple trades: Seattle → Washington (PD). See Round 3: Seattle → Washington. Washington → Philadelphia (D). See Round 2: Washington → Philadelphia.)
5	153	Jacksonville Jaguars	Deantre Prince	CB	Ole Miss	
5	154	Los Angeles Rams	Brennan Jackson	DE	Washington State	
5	155	Philadelphia Eagles	Jeremiah Trotter Jr.	LB	Clemson	from Pittsburgh via LA Rams, Carolina, and Indianapolis (Note: No. 155: Pittsburgh → LA Rams → Carolina → Indianapolis → Philadelphia. Multiple trades: Pittsburgh → LA Rams (PD). See Round 4: LA Rams → Pittsburgh. LA Rams → Carolina (D). See Round 2: Carolina → LA Rams. Carolina → Indianapolis (D). See Round 2: Indianapolis → Carolina. Indianapolis → Philadelphia (D). Indianapolis traded a fifth-round selection (155th overall) to Philadelphia in exchange for fifth- and sixth-round selections (164th and 201st overall).)
5	156	Cleveland Browns	Jamari Thrash	WR	Louisville	from Philadelphia via Arizona (Note: No. 156: Philadelphia → Arizona → Cleveland. Multiple trades: Philadelphia → Arizona (PD). Philadelphia traded a fifth-round selection (156th overall) and a 2023 third-round selection (94th overall) to Arizona in exchange for a third-round selection (66th overall). The trade also settled Philadelphia's tampering complaint against Arizona regarding the Cardinals hiring Eagles DC Jonathan Gannon as their head coach. Arizona → Cleveland (PD). Arizona traded a fifth-round selection (156th overall) to Cleveland in exchange for a seventh-round selection (230th overall) and QB Joshua Dobbs.)
5	157	Carolina Panthers	Chau Smith-Wade	CB	Washington State	from Cleveland via Minnesota and NY Jets (Note: No. 157: Cleveland → Minnesota → NY Jets → Carolina. Multiple trades: Cleveland → Minnesota (PD). Cleveland traded a fifth-round selection (157th overall) and a 2025 fifth-round selection to Minnesota in exchange for 2025 sixth- and seventh-round selections, and DE Za'Darius Smith. Minnesota → NY Jets (D). See Round 1: NY Jets → Minnesota. NY Jets → Carolina (D). See Round 3: Carolina → NY Jets.)
5	158	Miami Dolphins	Mohamed Kamara	DE	Colorado State	
5	159	Kansas City Chiefs	Hunter Nourzad	C	Penn State	from Dallas (Note: No. 159: Dallas → Kansas City (PD). Dallas traded a fifth-round selection (159th overall) to Kansas City in exchange for the Chiefs' 2023 sixth-round selection (178th overall).)
5	160	Buffalo Bills	Edefuan Ulofoshio	LB	Washington	from Green Bay (Note: No. 160: Green Bay → Buffalo (PD). See Round 3: Buffalo → Green Bay.)
5	161	Washington Commanders	Dominique Hampton	S	Washington	from Tampa Bay via Philadelphia (Note: No. 161: Tampa Bay → Philadelphia → Washington. Multiple trades: Tampa Bay → Philadelphia (PD). Tampa Bay traded a fifth-round selection (161st overall) to Philadelphia in exchange for a 2023 sixth-round selection (191st overall). Philadelphia → Washington (D). See Round 2: Washington → Philadelphia.)
5	162	Arizona Cardinals	Christian Jones	T	Texas	from Houston (Note: No. 162: Houston → Arizona (PD). Houston traded a fifth-round selection (162nd overall) to Arizona in exchange for a seventh-round selection (224th overall) and OT Josh Jones.)
5	163	Green Bay Packers	Jacob Monk	C	Duke	from Buffalo (Note: No. 163: Buffalo → Green Bay (D). Buffalo traded a fifth-round selection (163rd overall) to Green Bay in exchange for fifth- and sixth-round selections (168th and 219th overall).)
5	164	Indianapolis Colts	Jaylin Simpson	S	Auburn	from Detroit via Philadelphia (Note: No. 164: Detroit → Philadelphia → Indianapolis. Multiple trades: Detroit → Philadelphia (D) See Round 4: Philadelphia → Detroit. Philadelphia → Indianapolis (D). See Round 5: Indianapolis → Philadelphia.)
5	165	Baltimore Ravens	Rasheen Ali	RB	Marshall	
5	166	New York Giants	Tyrone Tracy Jr.	RB	Purdue	from San Francisco via Carolina (Note: No. 166: San Francisco → Carolina → NY Giants. Multiple trades: San Francisco → Carolina (PD). San Francisco traded a fifth-round selection (166th overall), and 2023 second-, third- and fourth-round selections (61st, 93rd and 132nd overall) to Carolina in exchange for RB Christian McCaffrey. Carolina → NY Giants (PD). See Round 2: NY Giants → Carolina.)
5	167	Jacksonville Jaguars	Keilan Robinson	RB	Texas	from Kansas City via Minnesota (Note: No. 167: Kansas City → Minnesota → Jacksonville. Multiple trades: Kansas City → Minnesota (PD). Kansas City traded a fifth-round selection (167th overall) and a 2023 fourth-round selection (134th overall) to Minnesota in exchange for the Vikings 2023 fourth-round selection (119th overall). Minnesota → Jacksonville (D). See Round 1: Jacksonville → Minnesota.)
5*	168	Buffalo Bills	Javon Solomon	DE	Troy	from New Orleans via Green Bay (Note: No. 168: New Orleans → Green Bay → Buffalo. Multiple trades: New Orleans → Green Bay (D). See Round 2: Green Bay → New Orleans. Green Bay → Buffalo (D). See Round 5: Buffalo → Green Bay.)
5*	169	Green Bay Packers	Kitan Oladapo	S	Oregon State	
5*	170	New Orleans Saints	Bub Means	WR	Pittsburgh	
5*	171	New York Jets	Jordan Travis	QB	Florida State	from Philadelphia (Note: No. 171: Philadelphia → NY Jets (D). Philadelphia traded a fifth-round selection (171st overall) to NY Jets in exchange for two sixth-round selection (185th and 190th overall).)
5*	172	Philadelphia Eagles	Trevor Keegan	G	Michigan	
5*	173	New York Jets	Isaiah Davis	RB	South Dakota State	from Kansas City via San Francisco (Note: No. 173: Kansas City → San Francisco → NY Jets. Multiple trades: Kansas City → San Francisco (D). See Round 2: San Francisco → Kansas City. San Francisco → NY Jets (D). See Round 4: NY Jets → San Francisco.)
5*	174	Dallas Cowboys	Caelen Carson	CB	Wake Forest	
5*	175	New Orleans Saints	Jaylan Ford	LB	Texas	
5*	176	New York Jets	Qwan'tez Stiggers	CB		from San Francisco (Note: No. 176: San Francisco → NY Jets (D). See Round 4: NY Jets → San Francisco.); drafted from Toronto Argonauts of the CFL
6	177	Minnesota Vikings	Walter Rouse	T	Oklahoma	from Carolina via Jacksonville (Note: No. 177: Carolina → Jacksonville → Minnesota. Multiple trades: Carolina → Jacksonville (PD). Carolina traded a sixth-round selection (177th overall) and a 2023 seventh-round selection (226th overall) to Jacksonville in exchange for WR Laviska Shenault. Jacksonville → Minnesota (PD). Jacksonville traded a sixth-round selection to Minnesota in exchange for G Ezra Cleveland.)
6	178	Pittsburgh Steelers	Logan Lee	DT	Iowa	from Arizona via Carolina (Note: No. 178: Arizona → Carolina → Pittsburgh. Multiple trades: Arizona → Carolina (PD). Arizona traded a sixth-round selection and a 2025 seventh-round selection to Carolina in exchange for WR Robbie Chosen. Carolina → Pittsburgh (PD). Carolina traded a sixth-round selection and CB Donte Jackson to Pittsburgh in exchange for a seventh-round selection and WR Diontae Johnson.)
6	179	Seattle Seahawks	Sataoa Laumea	G	Utah	from Washington (Note: No. 179: Washington → Seattle (PD). See Round 3: Seattle → Washington.)
6	180	New England Patriots	Marcellas Dial	CB	South Carolina	
6	181	Los Angeles Chargers	Kimani Vidal	RB	Troy	
6	182	Tennessee Titans	Jha'Quan Jackson	WR	Tulane	from Tennessee via Philadelphia (Note: No. 182: Tennessee → Philadelphia → Tennessee. Multiple trades: Tennessee → Philadelphia (PD). Tennessee traded a sixth-round selection to Philadelphia in exchange for a seventh-round selection and S Ugo Amadi. Philadelphia → Tennessee (PD). See Round 5: Philadelphia → Tennessee.)
6	183	New York Giants	Darius Muasau	LB	UCLA	
6	184	Miami Dolphins	Malik Washington	WR	Virginia	from Chicago (Note: No. 184: Chicago → Miami (PD). Chicago traded a sixth-round selection (184th overall) to Miami in exchange for G Dan Feeney.)
6	185	Philadelphia Eagles	Johnny Wilson	WR	Florida State	from NY Jets (Note: No. 185: NY Jets → Philadelphia (D). See Round 5: Philadelphia → NY Jets.)
6	186	Atlanta Falcons	Jase McClellan	RB	Alabama	from Minnesota via Arizona (Note: No. 186: Minnesota → Arizona → Atlanta. Multiple trades: Minnesota → Arizona (PD). Minnesota traded a sixth-round selection (186th overall) to Arizona in exchange for a seventh-round selection (230th overall) and QB Joshua Dobbs. Arizona → Atlanta (D). See Round 2: Arizona → Atlanta.)
6	187	Atlanta Falcons	Casey Washington	WR	Illinois	
6	188	Houston Texans	Jamal Hill	LB	Oregon	from Las Vegas via New England and Minnesota (Note: No. 188: Las Vegas → New England → Minnesota → Houston. Multiple trades: Las Vegas → New England (PD). Las Vegas traded a sixth-round selection to New England in exchange for a seventh-round selection and OT Justin Herron. New England → Minnesota (PD). New England traded a sixth-round selection to Minnesota in exchange for T Vederian Lowe. Minnesota → Houston (PD). See Round 1: Houston → Minnesota.)
6	189	Detroit Lions	Mekhi Wingo	DT	LSU	from Denver via LA Rams, Buffalo, and Houston (Note: No. 189: Denver → LA Rams → Buffalo → Houston → Detroit. Multiple trades: Denver → LA Rams (PD). Denver traded a sixth-round selection (189th overall) to LA Rams in exchange for a seventh-round selection (239th overall) and LB Kenny Young. LA Rams → Buffalo (PD). LA Rams traded a sixth-round selection (189th overall) and a 2023 seventh-round selection (252nd overall) to Buffalo in exchange for a 2023 sixth-round selection (215th overall). Buffalo → Houston (PD). Buffalo traded a sixth-round selection, 2025 fifth-round selection and WR Stefon Diggs to Houston in exchange for a 2025 second-round selection. Houston → Detroit (D). Houston traded a sixth-round selection (189th overall) to Detroit in exchange for sixth- and seventh-round selections (205th and 249th overall).)
6	190	Philadelphia Eagles	Dylan McMahon	C	NC State	from New Orleans via Green Bay and NY Jets (Note: No. 190: New Orleans → Green Bay → NY Jets → Philadelphia. Multiple trades: New Orleans → Green Bay (D). See Round 2: Green Bay → New Orleans. Green Bay → NY Jets (D). See Round 4: NY Jets → Green Bay. NY Jets → Philadelphia (D). See Round 5: Philadelphia → NY Jets.)
6	191	Arizona Cardinals	Tejhaun Palmer	WR	UAB	from Indianapolis (Note: No. 82: Indianapolis → Arizona (D). See Round 3: Arizona → Indianapolis.)
6	192	Seattle Seahawks	D. J. James	CB	Auburn	
6	193	New England Patriots	Joe Milton	QB	Tennessee	from Jacksonville (Note: No. 193: Jacksonville → New England (PD). Jacksonville traded a sixth-round selection to New England in exchange for QB Mac Jones.)
6	194	Cincinnati Bengals	Tanner McLachlan	TE	Arizona	
6	195	Pittsburgh Steelers	Ryan Watts	CB	Texas	
6	196	Los Angeles Rams	Tyler Davis	DT	Clemson	
6	197	Atlanta Falcons	Zion Logue	DT	Georgia	from Cleveland (Note: No. 197: Cleveland → Atlanta (PD). Cleveland traded a sixth-round selection (197th overall) to Atlanta in exchange for a seventh-round selection (230th overall) and LB Deion Jones.)
6	198	Miami Dolphins	Patrick McMorris	S	California	
6	199	New Orleans Saints	Khristian Boyd	DT	Northern Iowa	from Philadelphia (Note: No. 199: Philadelphia → New Orleans (PD). Philadelphia traded a sixth-round selection and a 2023 fifth-round selection to New Orleans in exchange for a 2025 seventh-round selection and S C. J. Gardner-Johnson.)
6	200	Carolina Panthers	Jaden Crumedy	DT	Mississippi State	from Dallas via Houston and Buffalo (Note: No. 200: Dallas → Houston → Buffalo → Carolina. Multiple trades: Dallas → Houston (PD). Dallas traded a sixth-round selection (200th overall) and a 2023 fifth-round selection to Houston in exchange for WR Brandin Cooks. Houston → Buffalo (PD). Houston traded a sixth-round selection and 2023 seventh-round selection (230th overall) to Buffalo in exchange for a 2023 sixth-round selection (205th overall). Buffalo → Carolina (D). See Round 1: Buffalo → Carolina.)
6	201	Indianapolis Colts	Micah Abraham	CB	Marshall	from Tampa Bay via Detroit and Philadelphia (Note: No. 201: Tampa Bay → Detroit → Philadelphia → Indianapolis. Multiple trades: Tampa Bay → Detroit (PD). See Round 3: Detroit → Tampa Bay. Detroit → Philadelphia (D). See Round 4: Philadelphia → Detroit. Philadelphia → Indianapolis (D). See Round 5: Indianapolis → Philadelphia.)
6	202	Green Bay Packers	Travis Glover	T	Georgia State	
6	203	Minnesota Vikings	Will Reichard	K	Alabama	from Houston via Cleveland and Denver and NY Jets (Note: No. 203: Houston → Cleveland → Denver → NY Jets → Minnesota. Multiple trades: Houston → Cleveland (PD).See Round 1: Cleveland → Houston. Cleveland → Denver (PD). See Round 5: Cleveland → Denver. Denver → NY Jets (PD). Denver traded a sixth-round selection (203rd overall) to NY Jets in exchange for a seventh-round selection (256th overall) and QB Zach Wilson. NY Jets → Minnesota (D). See Round 1: NY Jets → Minnesota.)
6	204	Buffalo Bills	Tylan Grable	T	UCF	
6	205	Houston Texans	Jawhar Jordan	RB	Louisville	from Detroit (Note: No. 205: Detroit → Houston (D). See Round 6: Houston → Detroit.)
6	206	Cleveland Browns	Nathaniel Watson	LB	Mississippi State	from Baltimore (Note: No. 206: Baltimore → Cleveland (PD). Baltimore traded a sixth-round selection (206th overall) to Cleveland in exchange for a 2023 seventh-round selection (229th overall).)
6	207	Seattle Seahawks	Michael Jerrell	T	Findlay	from San Francisco via Denver (Note: No. 207: San Francisco → Denver → Seattle. Multiple trades: San Francisco → Denver (PD). San Francisco traded a sixth-round selection to Denver in exchange for a seventh-round selection and LB Randy Gregory. Denver → Seattle (D). See Round 4: Seattle → Denver.)
6	208	Las Vegas Raiders	Dylan Laube	RB	New Hampshire	from Kansas City (Note: No. 208: Kansas City → Las Vegas (PD). Kansas City traded a sixth-round selection to Las Vegas in exchange for DT Neil Farrell Jr.)
6*	209	Los Angeles Rams	Joshua Karty	K	Stanford	
6*	210	Detroit Lions	Christian Mahogany	G	Boston College	from Philadelphia (Note: No. 210: Philadelphia → Detroit (D). See Round 4: Philadelphia → Detroit.)
6*	211	Kansas City Chiefs	Kamal Hadden	CB	Tennessee	from San Francisco (Note: No. 211: San Francisco → Kansas City (D). See Round 2: San Francisco → Kansas City.)
6*	212	Jacksonville Jaguars	Cam Little	K	Arkansas	
6*	213	Los Angeles Rams	Jordan Whittington	WR	Texas	
6*	214	Cincinnati Bengals	Cedric Johnson	DE	Ole Miss	
6*	215	San Francisco 49ers	Jarrett Kingston	G	USC	
6*	216	Dallas Cowboys	Ryan Flournoy	WR	Southeast Missouri State	
6*	217	Los Angeles Rams	Beaux Limmer	C	Arkansas	
6*	218	Baltimore Ravens	Devin Leary	QB	Kentucky	from NY Jets (Note: No. 218: NY Jets → Baltimore (PD). See Round 4: NY Jets → Baltimore.)
6*	219	Buffalo Bills	Daequan Hardy	CB	Penn State	from Green Bay (Note: No. 219: Green Bay → Buffalo (D). See Round 5: Buffalo → Green Bay.)
6*	220	Tampa Bay Buccaneers	Elijah Klein	G	UTEP	
7	221	Buffalo Bills	Travis Clayton	T		from Carolina via Tennessee and Kansas City (Note: No. 221: Carolina → Tennessee → Kansas City → Buffalo. Multiple trades: Carolina → Tennessee (PD). See Round 5: Tennessee → Carolina. Tennessee → Kansas City (PD). Tennessee traded a seventh-round selection and a 2025 third-round selection to Kansas City in exchange for a seventh-round selection and CB L'Jarius Sneed. Kansas City → Buffalo (D). See Round 1: Buffalo → Kansas City.); English rugby union player drafted from Basingstoke of Hampshire RFU
7	222	Washington Commanders	Javontae Jean-Baptiste	DE	Notre Dame	
7	223	Las Vegas Raiders	Trey Taylor	S	Air Force	2023 Jim Thorpe Award winner; from New England (Note: No. 223: New England → Las Vegas (PD). See Round 6: Las Vegas → New England.)
7	224	Cincinnati Bengals	Daijahn Anthony	S	Ole Miss	from Arizona via Houston (Note: No. 224: Arizona → Houston → Cincinnati. Multiple trades: Arizona → Houston (PD). See Round 5: Houston → Arizona. Houston → Cincinnati (PD). Houston traded a seventh-round selection (224th overall) to Cincinnati in exchange for RB Joe Mixon.)
7	225	Los Angeles Chargers	Brenden Rice	WR	USC	
7	226	Arizona Cardinals	Jaden Davis	CB	Miami (FL)	from NY Giants (Note: No. 226: NY Giants → Arizona (PD). NY Giants traded a seventh-round selection (226th overall) to Arizona in exchange for LB Isaiah Simmons.)
7	227	Cleveland Browns	Myles Harden	CB	South Dakota	from Tennessee (Note: No. 227: Tennessee → Cleveland (PD). Tennessee traded a seventh-round selection (227th overall) to Cleveland in exchange for OT Leroy Watson IV. (Note: Multiple sources: "Titans Acquire Tackle Leroy Watson in Trade With Browns". TennesseeTitans.com. April 12, 2024. Archived from the original on April 13, 2024.; "Browns trade T Leroy Watson IV to the Titans and acquire 2024 7th-round pick". ClevelandBrowns.com. April 12, 2024. Archived from the original on April 12, 2024.))
7	228	Baltimore Ravens	Nick Samac	C	Michigan State	from NY Jets (Note: No. 228: NY Jets → Baltimore (PD). NY Jets traded a seventh-round selection (228th overall) to Baltimore in exchange for S Chuck Clark.)
7	229	Las Vegas Raiders	M. J. Devonshire	CB	Pittsburgh	from Minnesota (Note: No. 229: 'Minnesota → Las Vegas (PD). Minnesota traded a conditional seventh-round selection to Las Vegas in exchange for QB Nick Mullens.)
7	230	Minnesota Vikings	Michael Jurgens	C	Wake Forest	from Atlanta via Cleveland and Arizona (Note: No. 230: Atlanta → Cleveland → Arizona → Minnesota. Multiple trades: Atlanta → Cleveland (PD). See Round 6: Cleveland → Atlanta. Cleveland → Arizona (PD). See Round 5: Arizona → Cleveland. Arizona → Minnesota (PD). See Round 6: Minnesota → Arizona.)
7	231	New England Patriots	Jaheim Bell	TE	Florida State	from Chicago (Note: No. 231: Chicago → New England (PD). Chicago traded a seventh-round selection (231st overall) to New England in exchange for WR N'Keal Harry.)
7	232	Minnesota Vikings	Levi Drake Rodriguez	DT	Texas A&M–Commerce	from Denver via San Francisco and Houston (Note: No. 232: Denver → San Francisco → Houston → Minnesota. Multiple trades: Denver → San Francisco (PD) See Round 6: San Francisco → Denver. San Francisco → Houston (PD). San Francisco traded a seventh-round selection to Houston in exchange for DT Maliek Collins. Houston → Minnesota (PD). See Round 1: Houston → Minnesota.)
7	233	Dallas Cowboys	Nate Thomas	T	Louisiana	from Las Vegas (Note: No. 233: Las Vegas → Dallas (PD). Las Vegas traded a seventh-round selection (233rd overall) and DT Johnathan Hankins to Dallas in exchange for a 2023 sixth-round selection.)
7	234	Indianapolis Colts	Jonah Laulu	DT	Oklahoma	
7	235	Denver Broncos	Devaughn Vele	WR	Utah	from Seattle (Note: No. 235: Seattle → Denver (D). See Round 4: Seattle → Denver.)
7	236	Jacksonville Jaguars	Myles Cole	DE	Texas Tech	
7	237	Cincinnati Bengals	Matt Lee	C	Miami (FL)	
7	238	Houston Texans	Solomon Byrd	DE	USC	from New Orleans (Note: No. 238: 'New Orleans → Houston (PD). New Orleans traded a seventh-round selection (238th overall) to Houston in exchange for RB Mark Ingram II.)
7	239	New Orleans Saints	Josiah Ezirim	T	Eastern Kentucky	from Denver via LA Rams (Note: No. 239: LA Rams → Denver → New Orleans. Multiple trades: LA Rams → Denver (PD). See Round 6: Denver → LA Rams. Denver → New Orleans (PD). Denver traded a seventh-round selection to New Orleans in exchange for K Wil Lutz.)
7	240	Carolina Panthers	Michael Barrett	LB	Michigan	from Pittsburgh (Note: No. 240: Pittsburgh → Carolina (PD). See Round 6: Carolina → Pittsburgh.)
7	241	Miami Dolphins	Tahj Washington	WR	USC	
7	242	Tennessee Titans	James Williams	S	Miami (FL)	from Philadelphia (Note: No. 242: Philadelphia → Tennessee (PD). See Round 6: Tennessee → Philadelphia.)
7	243	Cleveland Browns	Jowon Briggs	DT	Cincinnati	
7	244	Dallas Cowboys	Justin Rogers	DT	Auburn	
7	245	Green Bay Packers	Michael Pratt	QB	Tulane	
7	246	Tampa Bay Buccaneers	Devin Culp	TE	Washington	
7	247	Houston Texans	Marcus Harris	DT	Auburn	
7	248	Kansas City Chiefs	C. J. Hanson	G	Holy Cross	from Buffalo (Note: No. 248: Buffalo → Kansas City (D). See Round 1: Buffalo → Kansas City.)
7	249	Houston Texans	LaDarius Henderson	G	Michigan	from Detroit (Note: No. 249: Detroit → Houston (D). See Round 6: Houston → Detroit.)
7	250	Baltimore Ravens	Sanoussi Kane	S	Purdue	
7	251	San Francisco 49ers	Tatum Bethune	LB	Florida State	
7	252	Tennessee Titans	Jaylen Harrell	DE	Michigan	from Kansas City (Note: No. 252: Kansas City → Tennessee (PD). See Round 7: Tennessee → Kansas City.)
7*	253	Los Angeles Chargers	Cornelius Johnson	WR	Michigan	
7*	254	Los Angeles Rams	KT Leveston	G	Kansas State	
7*	255	Green Bay Packers	Kalen King	CB	Penn State	
7*	256	Denver Broncos	Nick Gargiulo	C	South Carolina	from NY Jets (Note: No. 256: NY Jets → Denver (PD). See Round 6: Denver → NY Jets.)
7*	257	New York Jets	Jaylen Key	S	Alabama	

== Notable undrafted players ==
Players who went undrafted also became eligible for the United Football League's 2024 draft.

Original NFL team	Player	Pos.	College	Notes
Buffalo Bills	Joe Andreessen	LB	Buffalo	
Carolina Panthers	Jalen Coker	WR	Holy Cross	
Carolina Panthers	Harrison Mevis	K	Missouri	
Carolina Panthers	Demani Richardson	S	Texas A&M	
Chicago Bears	Theo Benedet	T	UBC	
Denver Broncos	Levelle Bailey	LB	Fresno State	
Denver Broncos	Omar Brown	S	Nebraska	
Denver Broncos	Frank Crum	T	Wyoming	
Denver Broncos	Blake Watson	RB	Memphis	
Detroit Lions	Hogan Hatten	LS	Idaho	
Indianapolis Colts	Spencer Shrader	K	Notre Dame	
Indianapolis Colts	Dalton Tucker	G	Marshall	
Kansas City Chiefs	Ryan Rehkow	P	BYU	
Los Angeles Rams	Justin Dedich	G	USC	
Los Angeles Rams	Jaylen McCollough	S	Tennessee	
Los Angeles Rams	Omar Speights	LB	LSU	
Miami Dolphins	Storm Duck	CB	Louisville	
New Orleans Saints	Mason Tipton	WR	Yale	
New York Giants	Elijah Chatman	DE	SMU	
New York Jets	Brandon Codrington	CB	North Carolina Central	
New York Jets	Braiden McGregor	DE	Michigan	
New York Jets	Leonard Taylor III	DT	Miami (FL)	
Pittsburgh Steelers	Beanie Bishop	CB	West Virginia	
San Francisco 49ers	Cody Schrader	RB	Missouri	
Seattle Seahawks	George Holani	RB	Boise State	
Seattle Seahawks	Jalen Sundell	C	North Dakota State	
Tampa Bay Buccaneers	Kameron Johnson	WR	Barton	

== Trades involving draft picks ==
(PD) indicates trades completed prior to the start of the draft (i.e. Pre-Draft), while (D) denotes trades which took place during the 2024 draft.

== Resolution JC-2A picks ==
Resolution JC-2A, enacted by the NFL in November 2020, rewards teams for developing minority candidates for head coach and/or general manager positions by awarding draft picks. These draft picks are at the end of the third round, after standard compensatory picks; if multiple teams qualify, they are awarded by draft order in the first round. These picks are in addition to, and have no impact on, the standard 32 compensatory picks. Two picks were awarded for the 2024 draft pursuant to the resolution.

== Summary ==
=== Selections by NCAA conference ===
Conference	Round 1	Round 2	Round 3	Round 4	Round 5	Round 6	Round 7	Total
NCAA Division I FBS football conferences
American	0	0	1	0	1	2	1	5
ACC	4	4	7	5	8	6	7	41
Big 12	3	7	3	5	5	4	4	31
Big Ten	4	7	9	7	5	3	7	42
C-USA	0	0	1	1	0	1	0	3
Ind. (FBS)	1	1	2	0	3	0	1	8
MAC	1	1	0	0	0	0	0	2
MW	0	0	0	0	1	0	1	2
Pac-12	8	4	5	8	6	7	5	43
SEC	11	8	6	7	8	14	5	59
Sun Belt	0	0	0	0	2	3	1	6
NCAA Division I FCS football conferences
Big South–OVC	0	0	0	0	0	1	0	1
CAA	0	0	0	0	0	1	0	1
Ivy	0	0	1	0	0	0	0	1
MVFC	0	0	0	1	1	1	1	4
Patriot	0	0	0	0	0	0	1	1
Southland	0	0	1	0	0	0	1	2
UAC	0	0	0	0	0	0	1	1
Non-Division I football conferences
G-MAC (DII)	0	0	0	0	0	1	0	1
CWUAA (U Sports)	0	0	0	1	0	0	0	1
Non-College Selections
CFL	0	0	0	0	1	0	0	1
RFU	0	0	0	0	0	0	1	1

=== Colleges with multiple draft selections ===
Selections	Colleges
13	Michigan
11	Texas
10	Alabama, Florida State, Washington
8	Georgia, Oregon, Penn State
7	Notre Dame, USC
6	Clemson, LSU, Missouri
5	Auburn, Utah
4	Illinois, Iowa, Kentucky, Louisville, Miami (FL), Ohio State, South Carolina, Texas A&M
3	Arizona, Duke, Kansas State, Mississippi State, North Carolina, Oklahoma, Ole Miss, Oregon State, Pittsburgh, TCU, Tennessee, Wake Forest, Washington State
2	Arkansas, Boston College, Kansas, Marshall, Maryland, NC State, Purdue, South Dakota State, Texas Tech, Troy, Tulane, UCF, UCLA, UTEP, Wisconsin

=== Selections by position ===
Position	Round 1	Round 2	Round 3	Round 4	Round 5	Round 6	Round 7	Total
Cornerback	3	7	3	3	10	6	4	36
Wide receiver	7	4	5	4	4	7	4	35
Offensive tackle	8	4	5	2	1	4	3	27
Defensive tackle	1	7	2	3	0	6	5	24
Defensive end	5	2	3	0	5	1	4	20
Linebacker	0	1	6	2	6	3	2	20
Running back	0	1	3	7	5	4	0	20
Safety	0	3	3	4	4	1	5	20
Guard	0	1	5	2	1	4	3	16
Center	1	1	0	1	3	2	4	12
Tight end	1	1	1	6	0	1	2	12
Quarterback	6	0	0	0	2	2	1	11
Kicker	0	0	0	0	0	3	0	3
Punter	0	0	0	1	0	0	0	1

Position	Round 1	Round 2	Round 3	Round 4	Round 5	Round 6	Round 7	Total
Offense	23	12	19	22	16	24	17	133
Defense	9	20	17	12	25	17	20	120
Special teams	0	0	0	1	0	3	0	4
