= Montgomery Riverfront brawl =

2023 American brawl with racial undertones

- A frame from a video of a White man attacking a Black riverboat captain at the Montgomery Riverfront in August 2023
- Date: August 5, 2023; 3 years ago
- Location: Montgomery, Alabama, U.S. 32.3822°N 86.3138°W
- Caused by: Argument between the individuals and the co-captain

Casualties
- Injuries: 1 (Pickett)
- Charged: 6 (including the co-captain)

A large-scale altercation occurred on August 5, 2023, in downtown Montgomery, Alabama when bystanders intervened in a physical assault by a group of recreational boaters on the dock on Captain Damien Pickett, co-captain of the Harriott II, the City of Montgomery-owned riverboat, and prime attraction at Riverfront Park, located on the Alabama River.

Upon its return from a dinner cruise, the Harriott II was unable to dock due to a privately owned pontoon boat that had blocked its assigned docking space. The ship's crew notified the pontoon's occupants through the ship's loudspeakers, but the pontoon was not moved. After waiting close to 45 minutes, Captain Pickett and a deckhand boarded a smaller boat and sailed to the dock. After moving the pontoon to allow for adequate space to dock, the boaters argued and then attacked Pickett. Observers including riverboat's crew as well as bystanders came to Pickett's aid and defense.

The ensuing brawl was filmed by several witnesses with their phones and gained significant media attention due to its violent nature, the racial undertones, and Montgomery's racially charged history. Five participants were subject to arrest warrants, and all pled guilty to various charges, including misdemeanor assault, harassment, and disorderly conduct.

After the incident, the city of Montgomery partnered with local businesses and increased its surveillance systems to add additional security in the area.

== Background and incident ==
On August 5, 2023, around 7:00 p.m., the city-owned riverboat Harriott II, carrying 227 passengers, was returning to its designated docking space at Riverfront Park on the Alabama River in Montgomery, Alabama, following a cruise. In an interview with CNN, the co-captain of the Harriott II, stated the vessel had just completed the "5 to 7" cruise.

The riverboat's attempt to dock was obstructed by a privately owned pontoon boat that was moored in the Harriott II's assigned space, preventing the larger vessel from aligning its exit ramp with the dock. Montgomery Police Chief Darryl Albert stated that the dock space is widely known to be for the riverboat.

For approximately 45 minutes, the crew of the Harriott II made multiple attempts to contact the operators of the pontoon boat, requesting that they move their vessel. These attempts included announcements made over the Harriott II's public address system. According to the Harriott II's co-captains, Jim Kittrell and Damien Pickett, the occupants of the pontoon boat were either unresponsive or replied with dismissive and obscene gestures, such as "flipping off" the riverboat crew. This extended period of non-cooperation from the pontoon boaters contributed to escalating tension among the passengers and crew aboard the Harriott II, who were waiting to disembark.

Following the unsuccessful communication attempts, Captain Pickett, who is black, and a 16-year-old white male deckhand disembarked from the riverboat to address the obstruction. Pickett, with assistance from the deckhand, untied the pontoon boat and moved it "three steps to the right" to create the necessary space for the Harriott II to dock. They were then confronted by the boat owners.

Video of the incident shows individuals arguing with the captain. A short time later, the captain was assaulted by a white man, who shouted at him not to touch the boat. The two then began to fight, with another white man joining to attack the captain. Video shows that multiple individuals, white and black, attempted to break up the initial assault. A white woman from the private boat attempted to pull the attackers off the captain. A black man intervened to hold people off and another man held the captain back as multiple people pacified the original attacker. The 16-year-old white dock worker who had driven the captain to the dock was punched by one of the attackers after he attempted to pull attackers off of the captain.

Arguments and fights with Harriott II workers continued. A black teenager was filmed swimming across the river to the dock. He arrived at the dock after the initial assault was defused. Moments later, he fought with two white men and pushed a white woman.

When the Harriott II docked, crew members disembarked and confronted the initial assailants, which led to another altercation. The captain's sister was involved with this new fight and the captain grabbed her and moved her out of danger. At the Harriott II, bystanders and individuals connected to the initial assault begin arguing and punching each other. A black man used a folding chair to hit a white man and a white woman who had been punched and knocked down by multiple black women. Some white people were thrown into the river. Police were contacted at 7:00 p.m. and again at 7:15 p.m., arriving at the scene around 7:18 p.m.

The predominant racial lines of the fighting led to allegations that the assailants were racially motivated in their attack.

The altercations were caught on video.

External videos
- Witness videos of the brawl
- Full Video: Viewer records as Montgomery riverfront brawl begins
- Video of "Black Aquaman" swimming to the dock
- initial fight immediate aftermath, co-captain restrained by police officer
- Bystanders fighting next to Harriott II
- Various fights on the dock

== Aftermath and investigation ==
13 individuals involved in the brawl—including the co-captain who was hit by a police taser—were detained, questioned, and subsequently released. Montgomery Police Chief Darryl J. Albert confirmed arrest warrants for three men involved in the incident.

Arrest warrants were then expanded to another woman and a man hitting people with a chair. All five surrendered at the police station the following week.

The investigation was intensified due to the racial implications surrounding the fight. While the altercation mainly occurred along racial lines, preliminary investigations did not find sufficient evidence for hate crime charges. However, the incident has revived discussions around Montgomery's history, especially given the city's pivotal role in the slave trade in the United States and the Montgomery bus boycott during the civil rights movement.

== Public reaction and media coverage ==
The video of the brawl quickly went viral, drawing international attention and sparking discussions on race relations in Montgomery.

Mayor Steven Reed condemned the brawl, describing the instigators as "reckless individuals" and commending the swift response of the police department and community members.

Writing for the Montgomery Advertiser, journalist Shannon Heupel detailed positive reactions to the captain. A 16-year-old Black male wearing a blue "crew" shirt, identified publicly as "Aaren", was nicknamed "Michael B. Phelps", "Black Aquaman" or "Aquamane" after he dove off Harriott II to defend the captain. His actions were also praised.

The brawl was recounted in the song "Montgomery Brawl" by Gmac Cash.
