= Detroit Sign =

Landmark in Detroit, Michigan

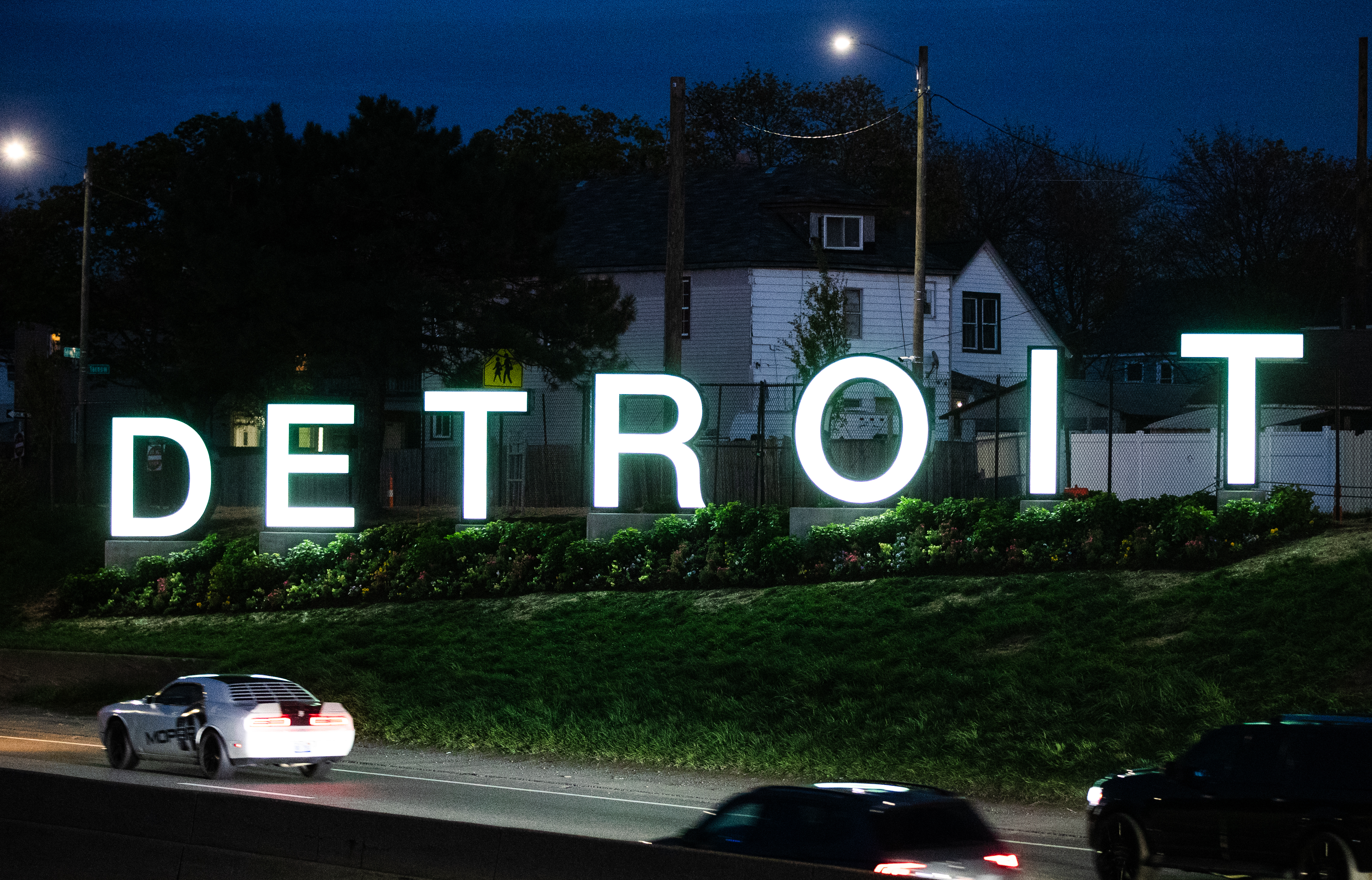
- The Detroit Sign at night in 2024
- Interactive map of the Detroit Sign area

General information
- Location: Detroit, Michigan, United States
- Coordinates: 42.3325°N 83.1370°W
- Completed: 2024; 2 years ago
- Cost: $425,000
- Client: Government of Detroit

Design and construction
- Architecture firm: Fairmont Sign Company

The Detroit Sign is a landmark in Detroit, Michigan, U.S. Constructed in preparation for the 2024 NFL draft hosted in the city, the structure is located near Interstate 94 to welcome visitors arriving from the Detroit Metropolitan Airport. The sign, built by the Fairmont Sign Company, spells out the word "Detroit" in eight-foot-tall (2.4 m) and five-foot-wide (1.5 m) mint green uppercase letters. The letters stand on two-foot-tall (0.61 m) concrete bases and light up at night. It is one of six signs commissioned by the city as part of its beautification efforts for the draft.

Public reaction to the sign was mixed, with criticisms focusing on the design of the letters and disappointment arising after city officials had suggested it would resemble the Hollywood Sign. A song by rapper Gmac Cash about the sign went viral shortly after the completion of its construction. Officials have suggested that the disappointment and criticisms stemmed from an artificial intelligence image that circulated on social media after the project was announced, which differed from their own renderings.

== History ==
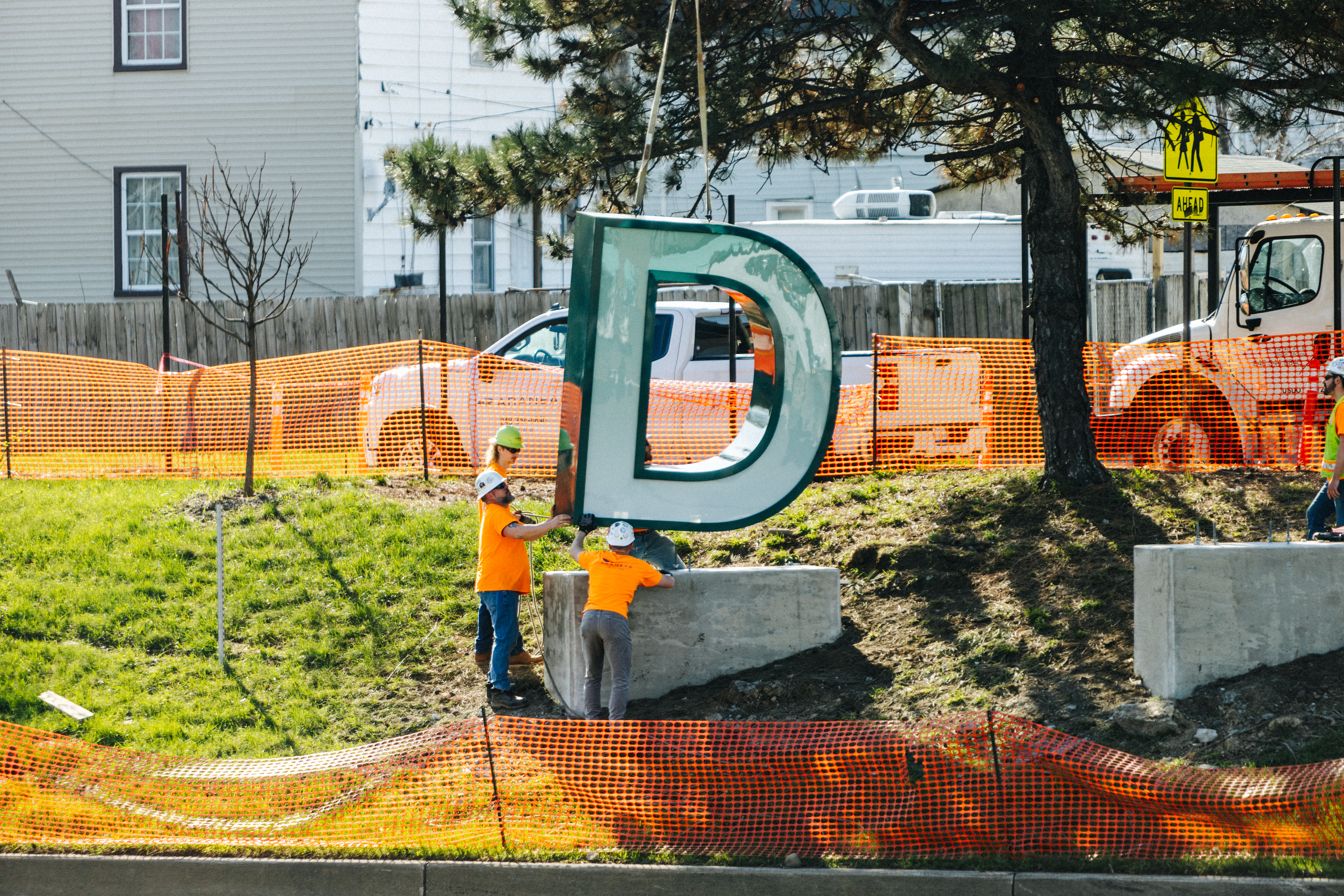
The sign under construction in April 2024

On March 28, 2022, the city of Detroit, Michigan, was selected by the National Football League as the host city for the 2024 NFL draft. The event was projected to positively impact the city's economy due to the anticipated attendance and associated activities. To prepare for the event, Detroit allocated city funds to various improvement projects, including the creation of murals, upgrading streets with better traffic lights, and enhancing landscaping. In February 2024, the city announced that a sign inspired by the Hollywood Sign would be installed by April to welcome travelers arriving from Detroit Metropolitan Airport to the city. Deputy Chief Operating Officer Jessica Parker stated that the sign would "be like the Hollywood Sign, but smaller" and that the "letters will look like they are floating on beautiful greenery."

After the city announced the project, an image of what the sign might look like was generated using artificial intelligence and circulated on social media. Although the image's origin was unknown and it was different from the official renderings, the AI image went viral on social media.

The city allocated $425,000 of city funding to complete the project, with the individual letters being built by the Fairmont Sign Company. Construction of the sign began in February, with the sign being completed on April 9. By April 17, DTE Energy had installed LED lights inside the letters to illuminate the sign after dark. Contractors placed fencing around the sign and worked on landscaping.

== Location ==
The sign is located along Interstate 94 between Detroit and Dearborn, Michigan, situated between Central Street and Cecil Avenue. The sign was installed there to welcome drivers entering the city from the Detroit Metropolitan Airport. The city prioritized community engagement for the project, carefully involving the neighborhood and listening to community feedback during its creation. The area surrounding the sign is landscaped, and the vicinity is fenced off to help prevent sign enthusiasts from being injured. According to Michigan State Police Lieutenant Michael Shaw, state troopers have had to intervene with a number of motorists who stopped on the freeway for selfies. The sign is one of six welcoming signs commissioned by the city of Detroit. Other signs include regular "Welcome to Detroit" signs located at Interstate 75 at 8 Mile Road, Interstate 96 at Telegraph Road, Interstate 94 at Moross Road, and at 8 Mile and Ford Road in Southfield, Michigan.

== Impact and reaction ==
After its completion, the sign received mixed reactions from residents and social media users. Criticisms mainly focused on the size and design of the letters, with some describing it as underwhelming compared to what was promised. Officials addressed online comments by stating that the sign was a "testament to Detroit’s growth over the last 10 years". Detroit Mayor Mike Duggan attributed the criticism to AI-generated images circulating on social media, which gave people a false impression of the sign. Some residents began placing parody signs in their yards, inspired by the Detroit Sign.

On April 9, 2024, comedy rapper Gmac Cash released the song "Detroit Sign", which humorously criticized the new sign in Detroit and satirized the city's aesthetic choices. He composed the song in just five minutes, aiming to differentiate himself from other artists in the city, and released a music video on April 12, 2024. Days later, Gmac Cash released a sequel titled "Detroit Sign 2", in which he addressed the sign's nighttime illumination and responded to critiques of his initial song.
