= Nash Rocky Mount Early College =

American public school in North Carolina

Location
- 530 North Old Carriage Road; Rocky Mount, North Carolina 27804; United States
- Coordinates: 35°58′35″N 77°53′50″W

Information
- Type: Public high school
- Locale: Rural: Fringe
- School district: Nash County Public Schools
- NCES School ID: 370327002644
- Principal: Thomas Mcgeachy
- Teaching staff: 14.00 (on an FTE basis)
- Grades: 9–13
- Enrollment: 405 (2023–2024)
- Student to teacher ratio: 28.93
- Color(s): Blue and gray
- Mascot: Eagle
- Website: nrmearlycollegehs.ncpschools.net

The Nash Rocky Mount Early College is a grades 9–13 public high school in Rocky Mount, North Carolina, United States.

Students attending the early college attend for either four or five years, instead of just the traditional four. However, instead of receiving just a high school diploma, they also get a two-year associate degree or two years of college transfer credit.
