= Nash County Public Schools =

School district in North Carolina, United States

Location
- 930 Eastern Avenue; Nashville, NC 27856 Nash County Nash, North Carolina; United States

District information
- Grades: PK-13

Students and staff
- Students: 14,275 (as of 2023-2024)
- Teachers: 918 (FTE) (as of 2019-20)

Other information
- Website: www.ncpschools.net

Nash County Public Schools covers a 591-square-mile (1,530 km^{2}) area covering all of Nash County in the U.S. state of North Carolina.

== History ==
Rocky Mount City Schools merged with the Nash County Schools in 1992 to create Nash-Rocky Mount Public Schools.

Southern Nash High School took the place of Spring Hope High, Coopers High 1–12, Bailey High, and Middlesex High.

In 2020, the district was renamed to Nash County Public Schools.

== Schools ==
=== Early Learning ===
- Williford Early Learning Center

Elementary schools

- Bailey Elementary School
- Benvenue Elementary School
- Coopers Elementary School
- Edwards Elementary School
- Englewood Elementary School
- Hubbard Elementary School
- Middlesex Elementary School
- Nashville Elementary School
- Red Oak Elementary School
- Spring Hope Elementary School
- Winstead Avenue Elementary School

=== Middle schools ===
- Edwards Middle School
- Nash Central Middle School
- Red Oak Middle School
- Rocky Mount Middle School
- Southern Nash Middle School

=== High schools ===
- Nash Central High School
- Northern Nash High School
- Rocky Mount High School
- Southern Nash High School

=== Cooperative Innovative High Schools ===
- Nash-Rocky Mount Early College High School
- Citi High School

=== Virtual Academy ===
- Nash Everywhere Digital Academy

=== Alternative School ===
- Tar River Academy
