= Nash Central High School =

American public school in North Carolina

Location
- 4279 Nash Central High Road; Rocky Mount, North Carolina 27804; United States
- 35°57′21″N 77°53′53″W

Information
- School type: Public
- Motto: Live the Maroon
- Established: 2002 (24 years ago)
- School district: Nash County Public Schools
- CEEB code: 343371
- Principal: Victor Ward
- Teaching staff: 32.23 (FTE)
- Grades: 9–12
- Enrollment: 703 (2024–2025)
- Student to teacher ratio: 21.81
- Colours: Maroon and gray
- Athletics: 2-A
- Athletics conference: Eastern Plains
- Mascot: Bulldog
- Website: Nash Central High School
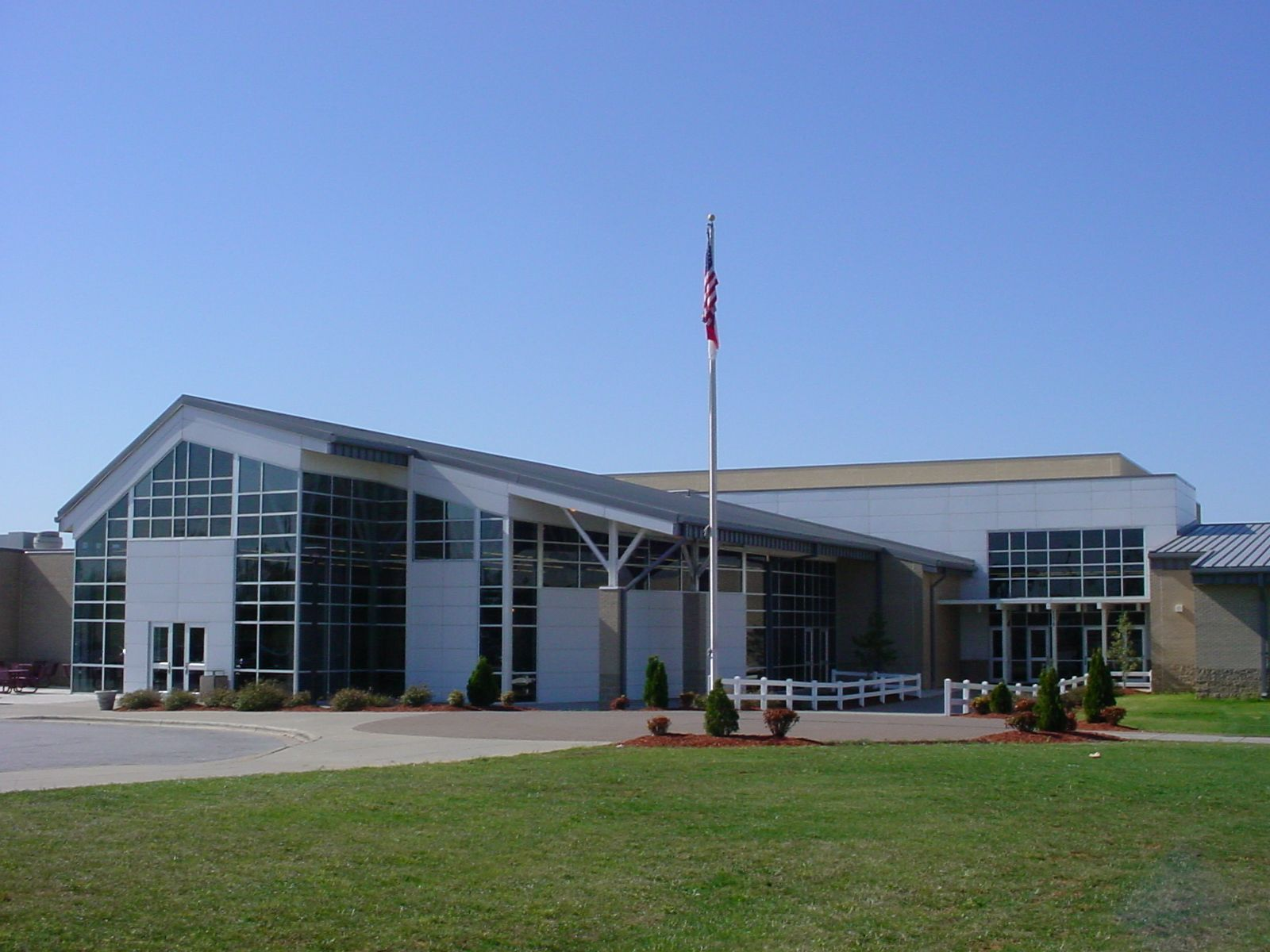

Nash Central High School is a Nash-Rocky Mount public high school located on the western edge of Rocky Mount, North Carolina and a member of the Eastern Plains 2-Athletic Conference. As of 2009–2010, Nash Central is home to over 1,200 students, 79 full-time educators—of which 32 have either earned an advanced degree (Master's or Ph.D.) or are certified by the National Board for Professional Teaching Standards—as well the personnel employed in administration, guidance and support positions.

In 2010, the U.S. News & World Report named Nash Central High a "Best High Schools in America" Bronze Medal School.

== History ==
Nash Central High was the most recent high school addition to the Nash County Public Schools when it opened in 2002. Currently Rocky Mount High School is the most recent high school building to have been built. Nash Central graduated its first class in 2005. The first principal of Nash Central High School was LeRoy Hartsfield (2002-2010), followed by Craig Harris (2010–2012), Gail Powers (2012–2015), and now current principal Victor Ward (2015–present).

== Campus ==
School facilities feature computers and internet access in 100% of the classrooms. The building is a two-story brick complex spotlighted by a high-ceilinged glass-walled library and 300 seat cafeteria of similar architecture. Nash Central Pond is accentuated by an illuminated fountain, a gift from the class of 2005. Sports facilities include a 1,500 seat gymnasium, 6 tennis courts, baseball and softball fields, a soccer field and a 4,000 seat football stadium with track.

== Community involvement ==
Nash Central is a member of the School Improvement Council, The Southern Association of Colleges, and the Business/Education Partnership Program with the Special Olympics, The Band/Chorus Booster Club, The Athletic Booster Club, Harris Teeter, Food Lion, Target, and EP Mart.

== Extracurricular activities ==
=== Athletics ===
Nash Central is a member of the 2-A Eastern Plains Athletic Conference and offers a variety of sports including:

Fall sports:

- Boys' cross country
- Girls' cross country
- Junior varsity and varsity football
- Girls' golf
- Boys' soccer
- Girls' tennis
- Junior varsity and varsity volleyball
- Junior varsity and varsity cheerleading

Winter sports:

- Boys' junior varsity and varsity basketball
- Girls' junior varsity and varsity basketball
- Boys' indoor track and field
- Girls' indoor track and field
- Boys' swimming
- Girls' swimming
- wrestling

Spring sports:

- Junior varsity and varsity baseball
- Girls' golf
- Girls' soccer
- Junior varsity and varsity softball
- Boys' tennis
- Boys' outdoor track and field
- Girls' outdoor track and field
