= Northern Nash High School =

American school in North Carolina

Location
- 4230 Green Hills Road; Rocky Mount, North Carolina 27804; United States; 35°59′56″N 77°53′29″W

Information
- Motto: "Encouraging Students to become Life-long Learners"
- Established: 1966 (60 years ago)
- Status: Open for enrollment
- School district: Nash County Public Schools
- CEEB code: 343365
- Principal: Michael Girouard
- Teaching staff: 60.90
- Grades: 9–12
- Enrollment: 1,029 (2023–2024)
- Average class size: ~30 students
- Student to teacher ratio: 16.90
- Colors: Green and gold
- Athletics conference: Big East
- Mascot: Knight
- Team name: Fighting Knights
- Website: northernnashhs.ncpschools.net

Northern Nash High School is a high school located in Nash County, west of the Rocky Mount, North Carolina city limits.

== History ==
Northern Nash High School opened in 1966, consolidating the former Nashville High School, Red Oak High School, Benvenue High School and in its second year, Swift Creek High School. As such, it was one of the first integrated schools in Rocky Mount.

== Curriculum ==
Northern Nash offers Cisco Networking Academy courses in its technical education offerings. A dual-enrollment program is offered in which students may enroll in some classes at nearby Nash Community College.

== Band program ==
The band program has many ensembles during both the summer and the school year, including Marching Band, Symphonic Band, Wind Ensemble, Percussion Ensemble, and Winterguard.

== Notable alumni ==
- J. J. Arrington, former NFL running back
- Luther Barnes, gospel singer
- Roy A. Cooper, Governor of North Carolina
- Billy Godwin, East Carolina University baseball coach
- Terrence J, television personality
- Kameron Johnson, NFL wide receiver for the Tampa Bay Buccaneers
- Charles Pittman, former NBA basketball player
- Mike Tyson, former MLB player
- Phil Valentine, syndicated talk show host
