= List of high schools in North Carolina =

This is a list of high schools in the state of North Carolina.

Any school that is not marked as a "charter" or "private" school is a public school.

== Alamance County ==
- Eastern Alamance High School, Mebane
- Western Alamance High School, Elon
- Southeast Alamance High School, Haw River

=== Burlington ===
- Blessed Sacrament School (private)
- Career and Technical Education Center
- Burlington Christian Academy (private)
- The Burlington School (private)
- Clover Garden School (charter)
- Hugh M. Cummings High School
- Walter M. Williams High School

=== Graham ===
- Alamance Christian School (private)
- Alamance-Burlington Early College
- Graham High School
- The Hawbridge School (charter)
- Ray Street Academy
- River Mill Academy (charter)
- Southern Alamance High School

== Alexander County ==
- Alexander Central High School, Taylorsville

== Alleghany County ==
- Alleghany High School, Sparta

== Anson County ==
- Anson County Early College, Polkton

=== Wadesboro ===
- Anson Academy
- Anson County Career Connect Program
- Anson High School
- Anson New Technology High School

== Ashe County ==
=== West Jefferson ===
- Ashe County Early College High School
- Ashe County High School

== Avery County ==
- Avery County High School, Newland
- Majorie Williams Academy, Crossnore (charter)

== Beaufort County ==
- Northside High School, Pinetown
- Pungo Christian Academy, Belhaven (private)
- Southside High School, Chocowinity
- Terra Ceia Christian School, Pantego (private)

=== Washington ===
- Beaufort County Early College High School
- Beaufort County Educational Technical Center
- Washington High School

== Bertie County ==
- Lawrence Academy, Merry Hill (private)

=== Windsor ===
- Bertie Early College High School
- Bertie High School
- Bertie STEM High School

== Bladen County ==
- East Bladen High School, Elizabethtown
- West Bladen High School, Bladenboro

== Brunswick County ==
- North Brunswick High School, Leland
- South Brunswick High School, Southport
- West Brunswick High School, Shallotte

=== Bolivia ===
- Brunswick County Early College High School
- Center of Applied Science and Technology (COAST)

== Buncombe County ==
- Charles D. Owen High School, Black Mountain
- Christ School, Arden (private)
- Enka High School, Enka
- Mount Pisgah Academy, Candler (private)
- North Buncombe High School, Weaverville

=== Asheville ===
- A. C. Reynolds High School
- Asheville High School
- Asheville School (private)
- Buncombe County Center for Career Innovation
- Buncombe County Early College
- Carolina Day School (private)
- Clyde A. Erwin High School
- Martin L. Nesbitt Discovery Academy
- Odyssey Community School (Private)
- T. C. Roberson High School

=== Swannanoa ===
- Asheville Christian Academy (private)
- Community High School

== Burke County ==
- East Burke High School, Connelly Springs
- Jimmy C. Draughn High School, Valdese
- Hallyburton Academy, Drexel

=== Morganton ===
- Burke Middle College
- Freedom High School
- North Carolina School for the Deaf
- R. L. Patton High School
- STEAM Academy

== Cabarrus County ==
- Hickory Ridge High School, Harrisburg
- Mount Pleasant High School, Mount Pleasant

=== Concord ===
- Cannon School (private)
- Carolina International School (charter)
- Central Cabarrus High School
- Concord Academy (private)
- Concord First Assembly Academy (private)
- Concord High School
- Cox Mill High School
- Jay M. Robinson High School
- West Cabarrus High School

=== Kannapolis ===
- A. L. Brown High School
- Northwest Cabarrus High School

== Caldwell County ==
- Gateway School, Granite Falls

=== Hudson ===
- Caldwell Applied Sciences Academy
- Caldwell Early College High School
- Heritage Christian School (private)
- South Caldwell High School

=== Lenoir ===
- Hibriten High School
- West Caldwell High School

== Camden County ==
- Camden County High School, Camden

== Carteret County ==
- Croatan High School, Newport
- East Carteret High School, Beaufort
- West Carteret High School, Morehead City

== Caswell County ==
- Bartlett Yancey High School, Yanceyville

== Catawba County ==
- Bunker Hill High School, Claremont
- Maiden High School, Maiden

=== Catawba ===
- Bandys High School
- Catawba Rosenwald Education Center

=== Hickory ===
- Challenger Early College High School
- Hickory Career & Arts Magnet School
- Hickory Christian Academy (private)
- Hickory High School
- St. Stephens High School
- University Christian High School (private)

=== Newton ===
- Discovery High School of Newton-Conover
- Fred T. Foard High School
- Newton-Conover High School

== Chatham County ==
- Chatham Central High School, Bear Creek
- Woods Charter School, Chapel Hill

=== Pittsboro ===
- Northwood High School
- Seaforth Highschool

=== Siler City ===
- Chatham Charter High School (charter)
- Chatham School of Science and Engineering Early College
- Jordan-Matthews High School
- SAGE Academy

== Cherokee County ==
- Andrews High School, Andrews

=== Murphy ===
- Hiwassee Dam High School
- Murphy Adventist Christian School (private)
- Murphy High School

== Chowan County ==
- John A. Holmes High School, Edenton

== Clay County ==
- Hayesville High School, Hayesville

== Cleveland County ==
- Burns High School, Lawndale
- Crest High School, Boiling Springs
- Kings Mountain High School, Kings Mountain

=== Shelby ===
- Cleveland Early College High School
- North Shelby Alternative School
- Shelby High School

== Columbus County ==
- East Columbus High School, Lake Waccamaw
- South Columbus High School, Tabor City
- West Columbus High School, Cerro Gordo

=== Whiteville ===
- Southeastern Early College and Career Academy
- Whiteville High School

== Craven County ==
- West Craven High School, Vanceboro

=== Havelock ===
- Early College EAST
- Havelock High School

=== New Bern ===
- Craven Early College High School
- The Epiphany School of Global Studies (Private)
- New Bern High School

== Cumberland County ==
- Cape Fear High School, Vander

=== Fayetteville ===
==== Public ====
- A.B. Wilkins High School
- Cross Creek Early College High School
- Cumberland International Early College High School
- Cumberland Polytechnic High School
- Douglas Byrd High School
- E. E. Smith High School
- Jack Britt High School
- Massey Hill Classical High School
- Pine Forest High School
- Ramsey Street High School
- Reid Ross Classical Middle/High School
- Seventy-First High School
- Terry Sanford High School
- Westover High School

==== Private ====
- Berean Baptist Academy
- Cumberland Country Christian School
- Fayetteville Academy
- Fayetteville Christian School
- Freedom Christian Academy
- Northwood Temple Academy
- Trinity Christian School
- Village Christian Academy

=== Hope Mills ===
- Gray's Creek High School
- South View High School

== Currituck County ==
- Currituck County High School, Barco
- J.P. Knapp Early College High School, Currituck

== Dare County ==
- Cape Hatteras Secondary School, Buxton
- First Flight High School, Kill Devil Hills
- Manteo High School, Manteo

== Davidson County ==
- Ledford Senior High School, Wallburg
- Oak Grove High School, Midway
- South Davidson High School, Denton
- West Davidson High School, Tyro

=== Lexington ===
- Central Davidson High School
- Davidson County High School
- Davidson Early College High School
- Lexington Senior High School
- North Davidson High School
- Sheets Memorial Christian School
- Stoner-Thomas School
- Union Grove Christian School
- Yadkin Valley Regional Career Academy

=== Thomasville ===
- East Davidson High School
- Thomasville High School

== Davie County ==
=== Mocksville ===
- Central Davie Academy
- Davie County Early College High School
- Davie County High School

== Duplin County ==
- Duplin Early College High School, Kenansville
- East Duplin High School, Beulaville
- James Kenan High School, Warsaw
- North Duplin Junior Senior High School, Calypso
- Wallace-Rose Hill High School, Teachey

== Durham County ==
=== Durham ===
==== Public ====
- Charles E. Jordan High School
- City of Medicine Academy
- Durham School of the Arts
- Hillside High School
- Hillside New Tech High School
- Josephine Dobbs Clement Early College
- Lakeview Alternative School
- Middle College High School at DTCC
- North Carolina School of Science and Mathematics
- Northern High School
- Riverside High School
- School for Creative Studies
- Southern School of Energy and Sustainability

==== Private/Charter ====
- Carolina Friends School (private)
- Cresset Christian Academy (private)
- Cristo Rey Research Triangle High School (private)
- Durham Academy (private)
- Mount Zion Christian Academy (private)
- Research Triangle High School (charter)
- Trinity School of Durham and Chapel Hill (private)
- Voyager Academy (charter)

== Edgecombe County ==
- North Edgecombe High School, Leggett
- Southwest Edgecombe High School, Pinetops

=== Tarboro ===
- Edgecombe Early College High School
- Tarboro High School

== Forsyth County ==
- Forsyth Country Day School, Lewisville (private)
- Ronald W. Reagan High School, Pfafftown
- Walkertown High School, Walkertown
- West Forsyth High School, Clemmons

=== Kernersville ===
- Bishop McGuinness Catholic High School (private)
- East Forsyth High School
- Glenn High School
- Triad Baptist Christian Academy

=== Winston-Salem ===
- University of North Carolina School of the Arts (university with a high school program)

==== Public ====
- Atkins Academic/Technology High School
- Career Center
- Carter Alternative High School
- Carver High School
- Early College of Forsyth
- Forsyth Middle College
- Kingswood Alternative School
- Main Street Academy
- Mount Tabor High School
- North Forsyth High School
- Paisley Magnet School
- Parkland Magnet High School
- Richard J. Reynolds High School
- Winston-Salem Preparatory Academy

==== Private schools ====
- Calvary Baptist Day School
- Carter G. Woodson School (charter)
- Gospel Light Christian School
- Salem Academy
- Salem Baptist Christian School
- Winston-Salem Christian School
- Woodland Baptist Christian School

== Franklin County ==
- Bunn High School, Bunn
- Franklinton High School, Franklinton

=== Louisburg ===
- Franklin County Early College High School
- Louisburg High School

== Gaston County ==
- Bessemer City High School, Bessemer City
- Cherryville High School, Cherryville
- South Point High School, Belmont
- Stuart W. Cramer High School, Cramerton
- Warlick Academy, Ranlo

=== Dallas ===
- Gaston Early College High School
- North Gaston High School

=== Gastonia ===
- Ashbrook High School
- Forestview High School
- Gaston Christian School (private)
- Gaston Day School (private)
- Highland School of Technology
- Hunter Huss High School
- Piedmont Community Charter School (charter)
- Webb Street School

=== Mount Holly ===
- East Gaston High School
- Mountain Island Charter School (charter)

== Gates County ==
- Gates County Senior High School, Gatesville

== Graham County ==
- Robbinsville High School, Robbinsville

== Granville County ==
- Granville Central High School, Stem

=== Creedmoor ===
- Granville Early College High School
- South Granville High School

=== Oxford ===
- Center for Innovative Learning
- J.F. Webb High School

== Greene County ==
=== Snow Hill ===
- Greene Central High School
- Greene Early College High School

== Guilford County ==
- Eastern Guilford High School, Gibsonville
- Northeast Guilford High School, McLeansville
- Oak Ridge Military Academy, Oak Ridge

=== Brown Summit ===
- Piedmont Classical High School (Charter)

=== Greensboro ===
==== Public ====
- Academy at Smith High School
- Ben L. Smith High School
- The Early College at Guilford
- Greensboro College Middle College
- Grimsley High School
- James B. Dudley High School
- Middle College at GTCC - Greensboro
- Middle College at NC A&T
- Northern Guilford High School
- Northwest Guilford High School
- Penn-Griffin School for the Arts
- Philip J. Weaver Academy
- Southeast Guilford High School
- Southern Guilford High School
- The STEM Early College at NC A&T
- Walter Hines Page Senior High School
- Western Guilford High School

==== Private ====
- American Hebrew Academy
- B'nai Shalom Day School
- Caldwell Academy
- Greensboro Day School
- New Garden Friends School
- Noble Academy
- Vandalia Christian School

=== High Point ===
- Academy at Central
- High Point Central High School
- High Point Christian Academy (private)
- Kearns Academy
- Middle College at GTCC - High Point
- Southwest Guilford High School
- T. Wingate Andrews High School
- Wesleyan Christian Academy (private)
- Westchester Country Day School (private)

=== Jamestown ===
- Middle College at GTCC - Jamestown
- Ragsdale High School

== Halifax County ==
- Northwest Collegiate and Technical Academy, Littleton
- Southeast Collegiate Prep Academy, Halifax
- Weldon High School, Weldon

=== Roanoke Rapids ===
- Halifax Academy (private)
- Roanoke Rapids High School

== Harnett County ==
- Harnett Central High School, Angier
- Overhills High School, Spring Lake
- Western Harnett High School, Lillington

=== Erwin ===
- Cape Fear Christian Academy (private)
- Triton High School

== Haywood County ==
- Pisgah High School, Canton
- Tuscola High School, Waynesville

=== Clyde ===
- Central Haywood High School
- Haywood Early College High School

== Henderson County ==
- East Henderson High School, East Flat Rock
- Henderson County Early College High School, Flat Rock

=== Hendersonville ===
- Hendersonville High School
- Heritage Hall International School (private)
- North Henderson High School
- West Henderson High School

=== Fletcher ===
- Fletcher Academy (private)

== Hertford County ==
- C. S. Brown High School S.T.E.M., Winton

=== Ahoskie ===
- Ahoskie Christian School (private)
- Hertford County Early College High School
- Hertford County High School
- Ridgecroft School (private)

== Hoke County ==
=== Raeford ===
- Hoke County High School
- SandHoke Early College
- Turlington Alternative School

== Hyde County ==
- Mattamuskeet High School, Swan Quarter
- Ocracoke High School, Ocracoke

== Iredell County ==
- North Iredell High School, Olin

=== Mooresville ===
- Lake Norman High School
- Mooresville High School
- Pine Lake Preparatory School (charter)
- Woodlawn School (private)

=== Statesville ===
- Collaborative College for Technology and Leadership
- Pressly K-12 School
- Statesville Christian School (private)
- Statesville High School
- West Iredell High School/Visual & Performing Arts Center

=== Troutman ===
- Career Academy & Technical School
- South Iredell High School

== Jackson County ==
- Blue Ridge School, Cashiers

=== Sylva ===
- Jackson Community School
- Jackson County Early College
- Smoky Mountain High School

== Johnston County ==
- Corinth Holders High School, Wendell
- North Johnston High School, Kenly
- Princeton High School, Princeton
- South Johnston High School, Four Oaks
- West Johnston High School, Benson

=== Clayton ===
- Clayton High School
- Cleveland High School
- Southside Christian School (Private)

=== Smithfield ===
- Johnston County Career and Technical Leadership Academy
- Johnston County Early College Academy
- Johnston County Middle College High School
- Smithfield-Selma High School

== Jones County ==
- Jones Senior High School, Trenton

== Lee County ==
=== Sanford ===
- Grace Christian School (private)
- Lee Christian School (private)
- Lee County High School
- Lee Early College High School
- Southern Lee High School

== Lenoir County ==
- North Lenoir High School, La Grange
- South Lenoir High School, Deep Run

=== Kinston ===
- Arendell Parrott Academy (private)
- Bethel Christian Academy (private)
- Kinston High School
- Lenoir County Early College High School

== Lincoln County ==
=== Denver ===
- East Lincoln High School
- Lincoln Charter School

=== Lincolnton ===
- Asbury Alternative School
- Lincolnton High School
- North Lincoln High School
- West Lincoln High School

== Macon County ==
- Highlands School, Highlands
- Nantahala School, Topton

=== Franklin ===
- Bartram Academy
- Franklin High School
- Macon Early College High School

== Madison County ==
- Madison Early College High School, Mars Hill
- Madison High School, Marshall

== Martin County ==
- Bear Grass Charter School, Bear Grass (charter)
- Martin County High School, Williamston

== McDowell County ==
- McDowell High School, Marion

== Mecklenburg County ==
- Grace Academy, Stallings (private)
- William A. Hough High School, Cornelius

=== Charlotte ===
==== Public ====
- Ardrey Kell High School
- Ballantyne Ridge High School
- Cato Middle College High School
- Central Piedmont Early College
- Chambers High School
- Charlotte Engineering Early College
- Charlotte Teacher Early College
- East Mecklenburg High School
- Garinger High School
- Harding University High School
- Harper Middle College High School
- Hawthorne Academy of Health Sciences
- Levine Middle College High School
- Mallard Creek High School
- Merancas Middle College @ CPCC
- Midwood High School
- Myers Park High School
- Northwest School of the Arts
- Olympic High School
- Palisades High School
- Phillip O. Berry Academy of Technology
- Providence High School
- South Mecklenburg High School
- West Charlotte High School
- West Mecklenburg High School

==== Private schools ====
- British International School of Charlotte
- Charlotte Catholic High School
- Charlotte Christian School
- Charlotte Country Day School
- Charlotte Islamic Academy
- Charlotte Latin School
- Charlotte Secondary School (charter)
- Charlotte United Christian Academy
- Hickory Grove Christian School
- Providence Day School
- Trinity Christian Preparatory School
- United Faith Christian Academy
- Victory Christian Center School

=== Davidson ===
- Community School of Davidson High School (charter)
- Davidson Day School (private)

=== Huntersville ===
- Christ the King Catholic High School (private)
- Hopewell High School
- Lake Norman Charter School (charter)
- North Mecklenburg High School
- Southlake Christian Academy (private)

=== Matthews ===
- Carmel Christian School (private)
- Covenant Day School (private)
- David W. Butler High School
- Greyfriars Classical Academy (private)

=== Mint Hill ===
- Independence High School
- Queen's Grant High School (charter)
- Rocky River High School

== Mitchell County ==
- Mitchell High School, Bakersville

== Montgomery County ==
- Montgomery Central High School, Troy
- Montgomery County Early College, Troy

== Moore County ==
- The Community Learning Center at Pinckney, Carthage
- North Moore High School, Robbins
- Union Pines High School, Cameron

=== Southern Pines ===
- The O'Neal School (private)
- Pinecrest High School

== Nash County ==
- Southern Nash High School, Bailey
- W. L. Greene Alternative School, Nashville

=== Rocky Mount ===
- Faith Christian School (private)
- Nash Central High School
- Nash Rocky Mount Early College
- Northern Nash High School
- Rocky Mount Academy (private)
- Rocky Mount High School
- Rocky Mount Prep (private)

== New Hanover County ==
=== Wilmington ===
- Cape Fear Academy (private)
- Coastal Christian High School (private)
- Emsley A. Laney High School
- Eugene Ashley High School
- Isaac Bear Early College High School
- John T. Hoggard High School
- Mary S. Mosley Performance Learning Center
- New Hanover High School
- South Eastern Area Technical High School
- Wilmington Christian Academy (private)
- Wilmington Early College High School

== Northampton County ==
- Northeast Academy, Lasker (private)

=== Gaston ===
- KIPP Pride High School (charter)
- Northampton County High School

== Onslow County ==
- Dixon High School, Holly Ridge
- Lejeune High School, Camp Lejeune
- Onslow County Learning Center, Hubert
- Richlands High School, Richlands
- Swansboro High School, Swansboro

=== Jacksonville ===
- Jacksonville High School
- Northside High School
- Onslow Early College High School
- Southwest High School
- White Oak High School

== Orange County ==
- Carrboro High School, Carrboro

=== Chapel Hill ===
- Chapel Hill High School
- East Chapel Hill High School
- Emerson Waldorf School (private)
- Phoenix Academy High School

=== Hillsborough ===
- Cedar Ridge High School
- Orange High School

== Pamlico County ==
- Arapahoe Charter School, Arapahoe (charter)
- Pamlico County High School, Bayboro

== Pasquotank County ==
=== Elizabeth City ===
- The Albemarle School (private)
- Northeastern High School
- Pasquotank County High School

== Pender County ==
- Heide Trask High School, Rocky Point
- Topsail High School, Hampstead

=== Burgaw ===
- Pender Early College High School
- Pender High School

== Perquimans County ==
- Perquimans County High School, Hertford

== Person County ==
=== Roxboro ===
- Person Early College for Innovation & Leadership
- Person High School
- Roxboro Community School (charter)

== Pitt County ==
- Ayden-Grifton High School, Ayden
- Farmville Central High School, Farmville
- North Pitt High School, Bethel

=== Greenville ===
- Calvary Christian Academy (private)
- D. H. Conley High School
- Greenville Christian Academy (private)
- Innovation Early College High School
- John Paul II Catholic High School (private)
- Junius H. Rose High School
- The Oakwood School (private)

=== Winterville ===
- Christ Covenant School (private)
- Early College High School
- South Central High School

== Polk County ==
- Polk County Early College, Columbus
- Polk County High School, Columbus

== Randolph County ==
- Providence Grove High School, Climax
- Randleman High School, Randleman

=== Asheboro ===
- Asheboro High School
- Fayetteville Street Christian School (private)
- Randolph Early College High School
- Southwestern Randolph High School

=== Ramseur ===
- Eastern Randolph High School
- Faith Christian School

=== Trinity ===
- Trinity High School
- Wheatmore High School

== Richmond County ==
- Richmond Early College High School, Hamlet
- Richmond Senior High School, Rockingham

== Robeson County ==
- Fairmont High School, Fairmont
- Maxton High School, Maxton
- Purnell Swett High School, Pembroke
- Red Springs High School, Red Springs
- St. Pauls High School, Saint Pauls

=== Lumberton ===
- Lumberton High School
- Robeson County Early College High School

== Rockingham County ==
- Dalton McMichael High School, Mayodan
- John Motley Morehead High School, Eden
- Reidsville High School, Reidsville
- Rockingham County High School, Wentworth

== Rowan County ==
- North Rowan High School, Spencer
- Rockwell Christian School, Rockwell (private)
- West Rowan High School, Mount Ulla

=== China Grove ===
- Jesse C. Carson High School
- South Rowan High School

=== Salisbury ===
- East Rowan High School
- Henderson Independent High School
- North Hills Christian School (private)
- Rowan County Early College High School
- Salisbury High School

== Rutherford County ==
- R-S Central High School, Rutherfordton
- Rutherford Early College High School (REaCH), Spindale
- Thomas Jefferson Classical Academy, Mooresboro (charter)

=== Forest City ===
- Chase High School
- East Rutherford High School

== Sampson County ==
- Harrells Christian Academy, Harrells (private)
- Hobbton High School, Newton Grove
- Lakewood High School, Salemburg
- Midway High School, Spivey's Corner

=== Clinton ===
- Clinton High School
- Sampson Early College High School
- Union High School

== Scotland County ==
=== Laurinburg ===
- Laurinburg Institute (private)
- Scotland Early College High School (SEarCH)
- Scotland High School
- Shaw Alternative Academy

== Stanly County ==
- Gray Stone Day School, Misenheimer (charter)
- North Stanly High School, New London
- South Stanly High School, Norwood
- West Stanly High School, Oakboro

=== Albemarle ===
- Albemarle High School
- Stanly Academy Learning Center
- Stanly Early College High School

== Stokes County ==
- North Stokes High School, Danbury

=== King ===
- Calvary Christian School (private)
- West Stokes High School

=== Walnut Cove ===
- South Stokes High School
- Stokes Early College

== Surry County ==
- East Surry High School, Pilot Mountain
- Elkin High School, Elkin

=== Dobson ===
- Surry Central High School
- Surry Early College High School of Design

=== Mount Airy ===
- Mount Airy High School
- North Surry High School
- White Plains Christian School (private)

== Swain County ==
- Cherokee High School, Cherokee
- Swain County High School, Bryson City

== Transylvania County ==
- Rosman High School, Rosman

=== Brevard ===
- Brevard High School
- Davidson River Alternative School

== Tyrrell County ==
- Columbia High School, Columbia

== Union County ==
- Forest Hills High School, Marshville
- Weddington High School, Weddington

=== Indian Trail ===
- Metrolina Christian Academy (private)
- Porter Ridge High School

=== Monroe ===
- Central Academy of Technology and Arts
- Monroe High School
- Parkwood High School
- Piedmont High School
- Sun Valley High School
- Tabernacle Christian School (private)
- Union Academy (charter)
- Union County Early College

=== Waxhaw ===
- Arborbrook Christian Academy (private)
- Cuthbertson High School
- Marvin Ridge High School

== Vance County ==
=== Henderson ===
- AdVance Alternative Academy
- Crossroads Christian School (private)
- Vance County Early College High School
- Vance County High School

== Wake County ==
- East Wake High School, Wendell
- Knightdale High School, Knightdale
- Rolesville High School, Rolesville

=== Apex ===
- Apex Friendship High School
- Apex High School
- Felton Grove High School
- Thales Academy (private)

=== Cary ===
- Cary Academy (private)
- Cary Christian School (private)
- Cary High School
- Green Hope High School
- Green Level High School
- Hopewell Academy (private)
- Middle Creek High School
- Panther Creek High School

=== Fuquay-Varina ===
- Fuquay-Varina High School
- Hilltop Christian School (private)
- Willow Spring High School

=== Garner ===
- Garner Magnet High School
- South Garner High School

=== Holly Springs ===
- Holly Springs High School
- Southern Wake Academy (private)

=== Raleigh ===
==== Public ====
- Athens Drive High School
- Leesville Road High School
- Longleaf School of the Arts
- Mary E. Phillips High School
- Millbrook High School
- Needham B. Broughton High School
- Raleigh Charter High School
- Jesse O. Sanderson High School
- Southeast Raleigh Magnet High School
- Vernon Malone College and Career Academy
- Wake Early College of Health and Sciences
- Wake Early College of Information and Biotechnologies
- Wake Young Men's Leadership Academy
- Wake Young Women's Leadership Academy
- Wakefield High School
- William G. Enloe High School

==== Private ====
- Cardinal Gibbons High School
- Friendship Christian School
- Grace Christian School
- Neuse Christian Academy
- North Raleigh Christian Academy
- Raleigh Christian Academy
- Ravenscroft School
- St. David's School
- Saint Mary's School
- St. Thomas More Academy
- The Raleigh Latin School
- Trinity Academy of Raleigh
- Wake Christian Academy
- Word of God Christian Academy

=== Wake Forest ===
- Franklin Academy (charter)
- Heritage High School
- North Wake College and Career Academy
- Wake Forest High School

=== Zebulon ===
- East Wake Academy (charter)
- Heritage Christian Academy (private)

== Warren County ==
- Haliwa-Saponi Tribal School, Hollister
- Warren New Tech High School, Norlina

=== Warrenton ===
- Warren County High School
- Warren Early College High School

== Washington County ==
- Washington County Early College High School, Roper
- Washington County High School, Plymouth

== Watauga County ==
- Watauga High School, Boone

== Wayne County ==
- Southern Wayne High School, Dudley
- Spring Creek High School, Seven Springs

=== Goldsboro ===
==== Public schools ====
- Charles B. Aycock High School
- Eastern Wayne High School
- Goldsboro High School
- Rosewood High School
- Wayne Early/Middle College High School
- Wayne Middle/High Academy
- Wayne School of Engineering

==== Private schools ====
- Faith Christian Academy
- Pathway Christian Academy
- St. Mary Catholic School
- Wayne Christian School
- Wayne Country Day School
- Wayne Preparatory Academy

== Wilkes County ==
- East Wilkes High School, Ronda
- North Wilkes High School, Hays

=== Millers Creek ===
- Millers Creek Christian School (private)
- West Wilkes High School

=== Wilkesboro ===
- Wilkes Central High School
- Wilkes Early College High School

== Wilson County ==
=== Wilson ===
- Beddingfield High School
- Community Christian School (private)
- Greenfield School (private)
- James B. Hunt Jr. High School
- Ralph L. Fike High School
- Wilson Academy of Applied Technology
- Wilson Christian Academy (private)
- Wilson Early College Academy
- Wilson Preparatory Academy

== Yadkin County ==
- Forbush High School, East Bend
- Starmount High School, Boonville
- Yadkin Early College High School, Yadkinville

== Yancey County ==
- Mountain Heritage High School, Burnsville

== See also ==
- List of school districts in North Carolina
