= List of schools in Charlotte, North Carolina =

This is a list of schools in Charlotte, North Carolina and its metropolitan area.

== Higher education ==
Includes schools throughout the Charlotte metropolitan area.

List of post-secondary educational institutions in the Charlotte metro area
| Institution | Est. | Type | City | County | Affiliation |
|---|---|---|---|---|---|
| Barber–Scotia College | 1867 | Private (Presbyterian) | Concord | Cabarrus | |
| Belmont Abbey College | 1876 | Private (Catholic) | Belmont | Gaston | |
| Cabarrus College of Health Sciences | 1942 | Public (two-year) | Concord | Cabarrus | Carolinas Medical Center |
| Carolinas College of Health Sciences | 1990 | Public (two-year) | Charlotte | Mecklenburg | Carolinas Medical Center |
| Catawba College | 1851 | Private (UCC) | Salisbury | Rowan | |
| Central Piedmont Community College | 1963 | Public (community) | Charlotte (main), Huntersville, Matthews | Mecklenburg | North Carolina Community College System |
| Charlotte Christian College and Theological Seminary | 1996 | Private (Evangelical) | Charlotte | Mecklenburg | |
| Cleveland Community College | 1965 | Public (community) | Shelby | Cleveland | North Carolina Community College System |
| Clinton Junior College | 1894 | Private (AME Zion) | Rock Hill | York | |
| Davidson College | 1837 | Private (Presbyterian) | Davidson | Mecklenburg | |
| ECPI University | | Private (for-profit) | Charlotte, Concord | Mecklenburg, Cabarrus | ECPI |
| Gardner–Webb University | 1905 | Private (BSCNC) | Boiling Springs | Cleveland | |
| Gaston College | 1963 | Public (community) | Dallas (main), Belmont, Lincolnton | Gaston, Lincoln | North Carolina Community College System |
| Gordon–Conwell Theological Seminary | 1992 | Private (Evangelical) | Charlotte | Mecklenburg | Boston Theological Institute |
| Hood Theological Seminary | 2001 | Private (AME Zion) | Salisbury | Rowan | |
| Johnson & Wales University - Charlotte | 2004 | Private (independent) | Charlotte | Mecklenburg | |
| Johnson C. Smith University | 1867 | Private (Presbyterian) | Charlotte | Mecklenburg | |
| Livingstone College | 1879 | Private (AME Zion) | Salisbury | Rowan | |
| Mitchell Community College | 1856 | Public (community) | Statesville (main), Mooresville | Iredell | North Carolina Community College System |
| Montreat College - Charlotte | 1994 | Private (independent) | Charlotte | Mecklenburg | Montreat College |
| Northeastern University - Charlotte | 2011 | Private (independent) | Charlotte | Mecklenburg | Northeastern University |
| Pfeiffer University at Charlotte | 1977 | Private (UMC) | Charlotte | Mecklenburg | Pfeiffer University |
| Queens University of Charlotte | 1857 | Private (Presbyterian) | Charlotte | Mecklenburg | |
| Rowan–Cabarrus Community College | 1963 | Public (community) | Concord, Kannapolis, Salisbury | Cabarrus; Rowan | North Carolina Community College System |
| South Piedmont Community College | 1999 | Public (community) | Monroe, Polkton, Wadesboro, Waxhaw | Anson, Union | North Carolina Community College System |
| Southern Evangelical Seminary | 1992 | Private (Christian) | Matthews | Mecklenburg | |
| Strayer University | | Private (for-profit) | Charlotte, Huntersville | Mecklenburg | |
| University of North Carolina at Charlotte | 1946 | Public (research) | Charlotte | Mecklenburg | University of North Carolina |
| University of South Carolina Lancaster | 1959 | Public (Baccalaureate) | Lancaster | Lancaster | University of South Carolina System |
| Wake Forest University School of Business - Charlotte | 1995 | Private (independent) | Charlotte | Mecklenburg | Wake Forest University |
| Wingate University | 1886 | Private (independent) | Wingate | Union | |
| Winthrop University | 1896 | Public (state university) | Rock Hill | York | |
| York Technical College | 1964 | Public (community) | Rock Hill | York | South Carolina Technical College System |

== Public schools ==
=== High schools ===
- Ardrey Kell High School
- Ballantyne Ridge High School
- Charlotte Mecklenburg Virtual High School
- David W. Butler High School
- East Mecklenburg High School
- Garinger High School
- Harding University High School
- Hopewell High School
- Independence High School
- Julius L. Chambers High School
- Mallard Creek High School
- Myers Park High School
- North Mecklenburg High School
- Northwest School of the Arts
- Olympic High School
- Phillip O. Berry Academy of Technology
- Providence High School
- Rocky River High School
- South Mecklenburg High School
- West Charlotte High School
- West Mecklenburg High School
- William A. Hough High School

=== Middle schools ===
- Albemarle Road Middle School
- Alexander Graham Middle School
- Bailey Middle School
- Bishop Spaugh Middle School
- Carmel Middle School
- Cochrane Collegiate Academy
- Community House Middle School
- Coulwood Middle School
- Crestdale Middle School
- Davidson IB Middle School
- Eastway Middle School
- Francis Bradley Middle School
- J. M. Alexander Middle School
- J. T. Williams Middle School
- James Martin Middle School
- Jay M. Robinson Middle School
- Kennedy Middle School
- Marie G. Davis Middle School
- Martin Luther King Jr. Middle School
- McClintock Middle School
- Metrolina Regional Scholars Academy
- Mint Hill Middle School
- Northridge Middle School
- Northwest School of the Arts
- Piedmont Open IB Middle School
- Quail Hollow Middle School
- Randolph Middle School
- Ranson Middle School
- Ridge Road Middle School
- Sedgefield Middle School
- South Academy of International Languages
- South Charlotte Middle School
- Southwest Middle School
- Wilson STEM Academy

=== Elementary schools ===
- Albemarle Road Elementary School
- Allenbrook Elementary School
- Amay James Pre-K School
- Ashley Park Elementary School
- Bain Elementary School
- Ballantyne Elementary School
- Berryhill Elementary School
- Barnette Elementary School
- Beverly Woods Elementary School
- Billingsville Elementary School
- Blythe Elementary School
- Briarwood Elementary School
- Bruns Avenue Elementary School
- Chantilly Montessori Elementary School
- Charles H. Parker Academic Center
- Clear Creek Elementary School
- Collinswood Language Academy
- Cornelius Elementary School
- Cotswold Elementary School
- Crown Point Elementary School
- David Cox Road Elementary School
- Davidson Elementary School
- Devonshire Elementary School
- Dilworth Elementary School
- Double Oaks Pre-K School
- Druid Hills Academy
- Eastover Elementary School
- Elizabeth Traditional Elementary School
- Elon Park Elementary School
- Endhaven Elementary School
- Governor's Village STEM Academy
- Greenway Park Elementary School
- Hawk Ridge Elementary School
- Hickory Grove Elementary School
- First Ward Creative Arts Academy
- Highland Mill Montessori Elementary School
- Hidden Valley Elementary School
- Highland Renaissance Academy
- Hornets Nest Elementary School
- Huntersville Elementary School
- Huntingtowne Farms Elementary School
- Idlewild Elementary School
- Irwin Academic Center
- J. H. Gunn Elementary School
- Joseph W. Grier Academy
- Lake Wylie Elementary School
- Lansdowne Elementary School
- Lebanon Road Elementary School
- Lincoln Heights Elementary School
- Long Creek Elementary School
- Mallard Creek Elementary School
- Matthews Elementary School
- McAlpine Elementary School
- McKee Road Elementary School
- Merry Oaks Elementary School
- Metrolina Regional Scholars Academy
- Montclaire Elementary School
- Mountain Island Elementary School
- Myers Park Traditional Elementary School
- Nations Ford Elementary School
- Nathaniel Alexander Elementary School
- Newell Elementary School
- Oakdale Elementary School
- Oakhurst Elementary School
- Oaklawn Language Academy
- Olde Providence Elementary School
- Park Road Montessori School
- Paw Creek Elementary School
- Pawtuckett Elementary School
- Pineville Elementary School
- Piney Grove Elementary School
- Polo Ridge Elementary School
- Plaza Road Pre-K School
- Providence Spring Elementary School
- Rama Road Elementary School
- Reedy Creek Elementary School
- Reid Park Academy
- River Gate Elementary School
- River Oaks Academy
- Sedgefield Elementary School
- Selwyn Elementary School
- Shamrock Gardens Elementary School
- Sharon Elementary School
- Smithfield Elementary School
- Starmount Pre-K School
- Statesville Road Elementary School
- Steele Creek Elementary School
- Sterling Elementary School
- Thomasboro Academy
- Torrence Creek Elementary School
- Tryon Hills Pre-K School
- Tuckaseegee Elementary School
- University Meadows Elementary School
- University Park Creative Arts School
- Villa Heights Elementary School
- South Academy of International Languages
- Walter G. Byers School
- Wesley Chapel Elementary School
- Westerly Hills Academy
- Winding Springs Elementary School
- Windsor Park Elementary School
- Winget Park Elementary School
- Winterfield Elementary School

=== Alternative and exceptional schools ===
- Amay James Alternative School
- Cato Middle College High School
- Central Piedmont Early College
- Charlotte-Mecklenburg Academy
- Harper Middle College High School
- Hawthorne Academy of Health Sciences
- Levine Middle College High School
- Lincoln Heights Academy
- Merancas Middle College at CPCC
- Metro School
- Midwood High School
- Morgan School
- Morningside at Graham Alternative School
- Turning Point Academy

== Private schools ==
- Adventist Christian Academy
- Back Creek Christian Academy
- Berean Junior Academy
- Bible Baptist Christian School
- British School of Charlotte
- Carmel Christian School
- Charlotte Catholic High School
- Charlotte Christian School
- Charlotte Country Day School
- Charlotte Islamic Academy
- Charlotte Jewish Day School
- Charlotte Latin School
- Charlotte Preparatory School
- Charlotte United Christian Academy
- Countryside Montessori School
- Covenant Day School
- Dore Academy
- The Fletcher School
- Grace Academy
- Grace Covenant Academy
- Greyfriars Classical Academy
- Hickory Grove Christian School
- Holy Trinity Catholic Middle School
- Hope Academy
- Northside Christian Academy
- Our Lady of the Assumption Catholic School (PK-8)
- Providence Christian School
- Providence Day School
- Resurrection Christian School
- St. Ann Catholic School (PK-5)
- St. Gabriel Catholic School (K-5)
- St. Matthew Catholic School (TK-5)
- St. Patrick Catholic School (K-5)
- Southlake Christian Academy
- Trinity Episcopal School
- Trinity Christian Preparatory School
- United Faith Christian Academy
- Victory Christian Center School
- Word of Wisdom in Excellence Academy

== Charter schools ==
- Bradford Preparatory School
- Charlotte Secondary School
- Central Wake High School
- Commonwealth High School
- Community Charter School
- Community School of Davidson
- Corvian Community School
- Crossroads Charter High School
- Kennedy Charter Public School
- KIPP Academy Charlotte
- Langtree Charter Academy
- Lake Norman Charter School
- Matthews Charter Academy
- Metrolina Regional Scholars Academy
- Mountain Island Charter School
- Pioneer Springs Community School
- Queen's Grant Community School
- Queen's Grant High School
- Socrates Academy
- Stewart Creek High School
- Sugar Creek Charter School
- Telra Institute
- Union Day School
- VERITAS Community School
