= List of school districts in North Carolina =

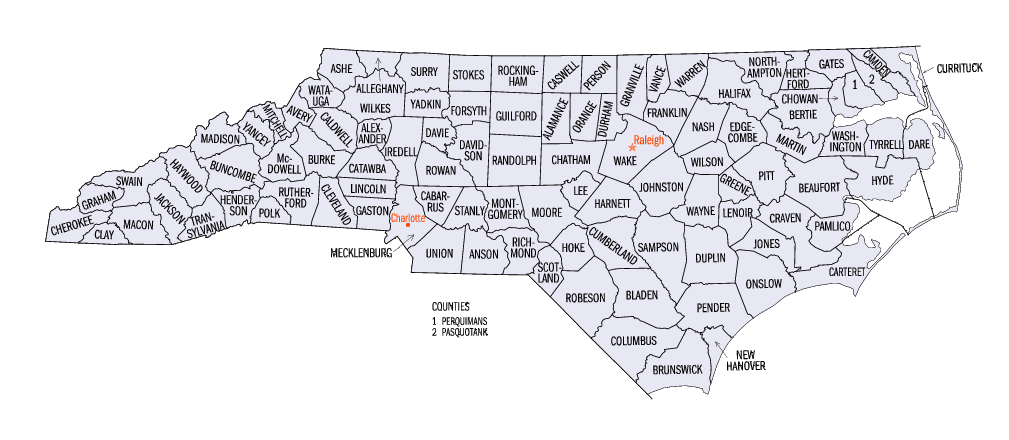

This is a list of school districts in North Carolina, including public charter schools.

In North Carolina, most public school districts are organized at the county level, with a few organized at the municipal level.

North Carolina does not have independent school district governments. Its school districts are dependent on counties and cities. Its technical and community colleges are also dependent on other layers of government.

== A ==
- Alamance-Burlington School System
- Alexander County Schools
- Alleghany County Schools
- Anson County Schools
- Ashe County Schools
- Asheboro City Schools
- Asheville City Schools
- Avery County Schools

== B ==
- Beaufort County Schools
- Bertie County Schools
- Bladen County Schools
- Brunswick County Schools
- Buncombe County Schools
- Burke County Public Schools

== C ==
- Cabarrus County Schools
- Caldwell County Schools
- Camden County Schools
- Carteret County Public Schools
- Caswell County Schools
- Catawba County Schools
- Chapel Hill-Carrboro City Schools
- Charlotte-Mecklenburg Schools
- Chatham County Schools
- Cherokee County School District
- Clay County Schools
- Cleveland County Schools
- Clinton City Schools
- Columbus County Schools
- Craven County Schools
- Cumberland County Schools
- Currituck County Schools

== D ==
- Dare County Schools
- Davidson County Schools
- Davie County Schools
- Duplin County Schools
- Durham Public Schools

== E ==
- Edenton-Chowan Schools
- Edgecombe County Public Schools
- Elizabeth City-Pasquotank Public Schools
- Elkin City Schools

== F ==
- Franklin County Schools

== G ==
- Gaston County Schools
- Gates County Schools
- Graham County Schools
- Granville County Schools
- Greene County Schools
- Guilford County Schools

== H ==
- Halifax County Schools
- Harnett County Schools
- Haywood County Schools
- Henderson County Public Schools
- Hertford County Public Schools
- Hickory City Schools
- Hoke County Schools
- Hyde County Schools

== I ==
- Iredell-Statesville Schools

== J ==
- Jackson County Schools
- Johnston County Schools
- Jones County Schools

== K ==
- Kannapolis City Schools

== L ==
- Lee County Schools
- Lenoir County Schools
- Lexington City Schools
- Lincoln County Schools

== M ==
- Macon County Schools
- Madison County Schools
- Martin County Schools
- McDowell County Schools
- Mitchell County Schools
- Montgomery County Schools
- Moore County Schools
- Mooresville Graded School District
- Mount Airy City Schools

== N ==
- Nash County Public Schools
- New Hanover County Schools
- Newton-Conover City Schools
- Northampton County Schools

== O ==
- Onslow County Schools
- Orange County Schools

== P ==
- Pamlico County Schools
- Pender County Schools
- Perquimans County Schools
- Person County Schools
- Pitt County Schools
- Polk County Schools
- Public Schools of Robeson County

== R ==
- Randolph County Schools
- Richmond County Schools
- Roanoke Rapids Graded School District
- Rockingham County Schools
- Rowan-Salisbury School System
- Rutherford County Schools

== S ==
- Sampson County Schools
- Scotland County Schools
- Stanly County Schools
- Stokes County Schools
- Surry County Schools
- Swain County Schools

== T ==
- Thomasville City Schools
- Transylvania County Schools
- Tyrrell County Schools

== U ==
- Union County Public Schools

== V ==
- Vance County Public Schools

== W ==
- Wake County Public School System
- Warren County Schools
- Washington County Schools
- Watauga County Schools
- Wayne County Public Schools
- Weldon City Schools
- Whiteville City Schools
- Winston-Salem/Forsyth County Schools
- Wilkes County Schools
- Wilson County Schools

== Y ==
- Yadkin County Schools
- Yancey County Schools

== See also ==
- List of high schools in North Carolina
