= Warren County Public Schools =

Warren County Public Schools (WCPS) may refer to:

- Warren County Public Schools (Kentucky)
- Warren County Public Schools (Virginia)
- Warren County Schools (North Carolina)

== See also ==
- Warren County School District (Pennsylvania)
