= Charlotte Preparatory School =

Charlotte Preparatory School may refer to:

- Charlotte Preparatory School, in Charlotte, North Carolina
- Charlotte Preparatory School, in Port Charlotte, Florida
