= Edenton-Chowan Schools =

Location
- Chowan County, North Carolina United States

District information
- Type: Public
- Grades: PK–12
- Established: 1968
- Superintendent: Rob L. Jackson
- Schools: 4
- Budget: $ 27,014,000
- NCES District ID: 3700840

Students and staff
- Students: 2,393
- Teachers: 170.91 (on FTE basis)
- Staff: 199.23 (on FTE basis)
- Student–teacher ratio: 14.00:1

Other information
- Website: www.edenton-chowan.net

Edenton-Chowan Schools is a PK–12 graded school district serving Chowan County, North Carolina, including the town of Edenton. It was formed from the merger of Edenton City Schools and Chowan County Schools in 1968. Its four schools serve 2,393 students as of the 2010–11 school year.

== History ==
The North Carolina General Assembly passed a session law in 1967 authorizing the school systems of Edenton City Schools and Chowan County Schools to merge. This officially occurred the next year, the system becoming Edenton-Chowan Schools.

== Student demographics ==
For the 2010–11 school year, Edenton-Chowan Schools had a total population of 2,393 students and 170.91 teachers on a (FTE) basis. This produced a student-teacher ratio of 14.00:1. That same year, out of the student total, the gender ratio was 53% male to 47% female. The demographic group makeup was: Black, 43%; White, 50%; Hispanic, 4%; American Indian, 0%; and Asian/Pacific Islander, 0% (two or more races: 3%). For the same school year, 64.55% of the students received free and reduced-cost lunches.

== Governance ==
The primary governing body of Edenton-Chowan Schools follows a council–manager government format with a seven-member Board of Education appointing a Superintendent to run the day-to-day operations of the system. The school system currently resides in the North Carolina State Board of Education's First District.

=== Board of education ===
The seven members of the Board of Education generally meet on the first Monday of each month. They are elected by district to staggered six-year terms. The current members of the board are:

- District 1: Gene Jordan, Jean Bunch
- District 2: Ricky Browder, John Guard (Chair)
- District 3: Gil Burroughs, Kay Wright (Vice-Chair)
- At-large: Glorious Elliott

=== Superintendent ===
The current superintendent of the system is Michael Sasscer, Ed.D.

== Member schools ==
Edenton-Chowan Schools has four schools ranging from pre-kindergarten to twelfth grade. Those four schools are separated into one high school, one middle school, and two elementary schools.

=== High school ===
- John A. Holmes High School (Edenton)

=== Middle school ===
- Chowan Middle School (Tyner)

=== Elementary schools ===
- D. F. Walker Elementary School (Edenton)
- White Oak Elementary School (Edenton)

== Achievements and awards ==
Edenton-Chowan Schools has had one school listed as a Blue Ribbon School: John A. Holmes High School (1984–85). The system has had one teacher recognized as a North Carolina Department of Public Instruction Teacher of the Year: James Bell in 2007–08.

== See also ==
- List of school districts in North Carolina
