= Rutherford County Schools =

Rutherford County Schools can refer to:

- Rutherford County Schools (North Carolina)
- Rutherford County Schools (Tennessee)
