= White Oak High School =

White Oak High School may refer to:

- White Oak High School (North Carolina)
- White Oak High School (Oklahoma)
- White Oak High School (Texas)
