= Macon High School =

Macon High School may refer to:

- Macon High School (Illinois), Macon, Illinois
- Macon High School (Mississippi), Macon, Mississippi
- Macon High School (Missouri), Macon, Missouri

== See also ==
- Macon County High School, Montezuma, Georgia
- Macon Early College, a high school in Franklin, North Carolina, United States
