= Clinton City Schools =

School district in Tennessee, United States

Location
- Sampson County, North Carolina United States

District information
- Type: Public
- Grades: PK–12
- Accreditation: AdvancED
- Schools: 5
- Budget: $ 30,665,000
- NCES District ID: 3700930

Students and staff
- Students: 3,179
- Teachers: 215.51 (on FTE basis)
- Staff: 188.30 (on FTE basis)
- Student–teacher ratio: 14.75:1

Other information
- Website: www.clinton.k12.nc.us

Clinton City Schools is a PK–12 graded school district serving Clinton, North Carolina. Its five schools serve 3,179 students as of the 2010–11 school year.

== Student demographics ==
For the 2010–11 school year, Clinton City Schools had a total population of 3,179 students and 215.51 teachers on a (FTE) basis. This produced a student-teacher ratio of 14.75:1. For the same school year, 71.00% of the students received free and reduced-cost lunches.

== Governance ==
The primary governing body of Clinton City Schools follows a council–manager government format with a six-member Board of Education appointing a Superintendent to run the day-to-day operations of the system. The school system currently resides in the North Carolina State Board of Education's Second District.

=== Board of education ===
The current members of the board are: E. R. Mason (chair), Chloe Zeng (Vice Chair) Randy Barefoot, Diane Viser, Jason Walters, and Carol A. Worley.

=== Superintendent ===
The current superintendent of the system is Deshawn Cox. He was hired in 2012 to replace Michael Basham. Deshawn was previously an assistant superintendent for Scotland County Schools.

== Member schools ==
Clinton City Schools has five schools ranging from pre-kindergarten to twelfth grade. Those five schools are separated into one high school, one middle school, and three elementary schools. All schools are located in the town of Clinton.

=== High schools ===
- Clinton High School

=== Middle schools ===
- Sampson Middle School

=== Elementary schools ===
- Butler Avenue Elementary School
- Langdon C Kerr Elementary School
- Sunset Avenue Elementary School

== See also ==
- List of school districts in North Carolina
