= Craven County Schools =

PK-12 graded school district serving Craven County, North Carolina

Location
- Craven County, North Carolina United States

District information
- Type: Public
- Grades: PK–12
- Superintendent: Dr. Wendy A. Miller (resigned)
- Accreditation: AdvancED
- Schools: 25
- Budget: $ 121,500
- NCES District ID: 3703310

Students and staff
- Students: 14,171
- Teachers: 897.59 (on an FTE basis)
- Student–teacher ratio: 15.79:1

Other information
- Website: www.craven.k12.nc.us

Craven County Schools is a PK–12 graded school district serving Craven County, North Carolina. Its 25 schools serve 12,152 students as of the 2024-2015 school year.

== Student demographics ==
For the 2015–16 school year, Craven County Schools had a total of 14,171 students and 897.59 teachers o(on an FTE basis), for a student-teacher ratio of 15.79:1.

== Governance ==
The primary governing body of Craven County Schools follows a council–manager government format with a seven-member Board of Education appointing a Superintendent to run the day-to-day operations of the system. The school system currently resides in the North Carolina State Board of Education's Second District.

=== Board of education ===
The seven members of the Board of Education generally meet on the third Thursday of each month. The current members of the board are: Frances Boomer (Chair), Kim Smith (Vice-Chair), Naomi Clark, Victor Dove, Carr Ipock, Stefanie A. King, and Kelli S. Muse.

=== Superintendent ===
Dr. Wendy A. Miller is the Superintendent of Craven County Schools.

== Member schools ==
Craven County Schools has 25 schools ranging from pre-kindergarten to twelfth grade. Those 25 schools are separated into five high schools, five middle schools, and 15 elementary schools.

=== High schools ===
- Havelock High School (Havelock)
- Craven Early College High School (New Bern)
- Early College EAST High School (Havelock)
- New Bern High School (New Bern)
- West Craven High School (Vanceboro)

=== Middle schools ===
- Grover C. Fields Middle School (New Bern)
- Havelock Middle School (Havelock)
- H. J. MacDonald Middle School (New Bern)
- Tucker Creek Middle School (Havelock)
- West Craven Middle School (Vanceboro)

=== Elementary schools ===
- Albert H. Bangert Elementary School (New Bern)
- Arthur W. Edwards Elementary School (Havelock)
- Ben D. Quinn Elementary School (New Bern)
- Bridgeton Elementary School (New Bern)
- Brinson Memorial Elementary School (New Bern)
- Creekside Elementary School (New Bern)
- Graham A. Barden Elementary School (Havelock)
- Havelock Elementary School (Havelock)
- James W. Smith Elementary School (Cove City)
- J. T. Barber Elementary School (New Bern)
- Oaks Road Elementary School (New Bern)
- Roger Bell Elementary School (Havelock)
- Trent Park Elementary School (New Bern)
- Vanceboro Farm Life Elementary School (Vanceboro)
- W. J. Gurganus Elementary School (Havelock)

== Athletics ==
According to the North Carolina High School Athletic Association, for the 2012–2013 school year:

- Havelock and West Craven are both 3A schools in the Coastal Conference.
- New Bern is a 4A school in the Mideastern Conference.
- Craven Early College and Early College EAST do not have athletic teams.

== Awards ==
The Craven County Schools system has had one school listed as a Blue Ribbon School: Arthur W. Edwards Elementary School (2008). One teacher in the school system has been recognized as a North Carolina Department of Public Instruction Teacher of the Year: Wendy Miller (2005–06). In addition, one former administrator has been recognized as a North Carolina Department of Public Instruction Principal of the Year: Tabari Wallace (2018).

== See also ==
- List of school districts in North Carolina
