= North Carolina Department of Public Instruction =

American state agency

- Logo of the North Carolina Department of Public Instruction

Department overview
- Formed: 1868
- Headquarters: 301 N. Wilmington Street Raleigh, NC 27601
- Annual budget: 1.46 million (2007–08)
- Department executives: Eric Davis, Chair, NC State Board of Education; Mo Green, State Superintendent
- Website: www.dpi.nc.gov

The North Carolina Department of Public Instruction (NCDPI) oversees the public school system in the U.S. state of North Carolina. The DPI is headed by the State Superintendent and the North Carolina State Board of Education. It is headquartered in Raleigh.

== History ==
The position of North Carolina Superintendent of Public Instruction was established by the North Carolina Constitution of 1868.

== Human Resource Management System ==
The Human Resource Management System (HRMS) is a part of the North Carolina Department of Public Instruction which is overseen by the North Carolina State Board of Education.

In the summer of 2000, the HRMS Steering Committee initiated the HRMS Web Project. The goal was to replace the legacy "green screen" software with a completely web-based system. Actual coding began in October of that year, and the initial phase was deployed two years later, in the fall of 2002. Work to replace all components of the legacy system is ongoing, and new features required by federal and state law are now implemented only in HRMS Web.

HRMS Web is a full-featured Human Resources Management System tailored specifically to the needs of North Carolina schools. It accommodates the complete HR cycle, from the applicant process, through employment, benefits, and evaluation. It also allows for a tight integration with vendor-supplied payroll systems in use by LEAs, eliminating the need for redundant data entry and maintenance.

== See also ==
- Government of North Carolina
- List of school districts in North Carolina
- List of high schools in North Carolina
- Education in North Carolina
