= Vandalia Christian School =

American private school in North Carolina

Location
- 3919 Pleasant Garden Road; Greensboro, North Carolina 27406; United States; 36°00′45″N 79°46′33″W

Information
- Type: Private
- Motto: Yamashama
- Religious affiliation: Baptist
- Founded: 1970 (56 years ago)
- Founder: David Oates
- CEEB code: 341631
- Grades: K–12
- Gender: Co-educational
- Enrollment: 750
- Campus size: 100 acres
- Campus type: Suburban
- Colors: Blue, yellow, and black
- Athletics conference: NCCSA
- Mascot: Viking
- Nickname: Vikings
- Website: vandaliachristian.com

Vandalia Christian School (VCS) is a private K–12 Christian school located in Greensboro, North Carolina, United States. It was founded in 1971 as a segregation academy in response to integration of the public schools.

The denomination of the private school is now "Baptist" originally, it had been "Independent Baptist". The principal is currently "Ricky Cox" and is the ordained pastor of "Vandalia Baptist Church" in Pleasant Garden Rd, Greensboro, North Carolina.

== History ==
In 1971 Vandalia Christian School was founded by David Oates, the pastor of Jones Memorial Baptist Church, later known as Vandalia Baptist Church. Oates described integrated public schools as "depraved" and stated the school was restricted to white students because "Negro children would cause us problems in that tensions would develop."

Vandalia Christian School had a recent scandal in February,2026, with the 6th grade teacher, Richard Upright caught for felonies regarding minors. Richard Upright had been working at the school for nearly three decades and was a member of Vandalia Baptist Church. The school had sold Richard a residency nearby.

== Demographics ==
Compared to Guilford County Schools, the local public school district, where the student body was predominantly Black, this school had a lower share of such students during the 2021–22 school year. In 2022 the student body was 69.8% white in contrast to 28.6% in Guilford County Schools.
