= Central Academy of Technology and Arts =

American public school in North Carolina

Location
- 600 Brewer Drive; Monroe, North Carolina 28112; United States
- 34°58′19″N 80°34′03″W

Information
- School type: Public
- Established: 2006 (20 years ago)
- School district: Union County Public Schools
- CEEB code: 342650
- Principal: Kevin Beals
- Staff: 51.41 (FTE)
- Grades: 9–12
- Enrollment: 846 (2023–2024)
- Student to teacher ratio: 16.14
- Colors: Navy, burgundy, and khaki
- Athletics: Soccer, Volleyball, Golf, Cross Country, Cheerleading, Tennis, Track, Basketball, Swimming, Wrestling, Baseball, Softball
- Team name: Cougars
- Website: cata.ucpsnc.org

Central Academy of Technology and Arts (CATA) is a public high school located in Monroe, North Carolina, and also Union County's first magnet high school. Unlike regular public high schools, students at Central Academy have the opportunity to have a major course of study in an academy of their choice that will give them a head start towards their future careers in life.

The academies include Information Systems (software, hardware, and cybersecurity), Medical Sciences, Performing Arts (theater, dance, and music production and recording arts), Pre-Engineering, and Transportation Systems. Teacher Preparation was eliminated before the 2015–2016 school year.

CATA is a part of Union County Public Schools, on Brewer Drive. The school was originally a career center, but now is a part of the public school system. The school was founded as a high school for grades 9–12 in 2006, with the first graduating class in 2009.

== Athletics ==
Central Academy has won the following North Carolina High School Athletic Association (NCHSAA) state championships.

NCHSAA State Championships
| Sport | Year(s) |
|---|---|
| Girl's Soccer | 2011 (1A) |
| Wrestling State Tournament Team | 2019 (2A), 2020 (2A) |
