= Chad Fonville =

American baseball player (born 1971)

- Infielder/Outfielder
- Born: March 5, 1971 (age 55); Jacksonville, North Carolina, U.S.
- Batted: Both Threw: Right

MLB debut
- April 28, 1995, for the Montreal Expos

Last MLB appearance
- July 9, 1999, for the Boston Red Sox

MLB statistics
- Batting average: .244
- Home runs: 0
- Runs batted in: 31
- Stats at Baseball Reference

Teams
- Montreal Expos (1995); Los Angeles Dodgers (1995–1997); Chicago White Sox (1997); Boston Red Sox (1999)

Chad Everette Fonville (born March 5, 1971) is an American former professional baseball infielder. He played in Major League Baseball for the Montreal Expos, Los Angeles Dodgers, Chicago White Sox, and Boston Red Sox between 1995 and 1999.

== Career ==
Fonville attended Louisburg College. In 1991, he played collegiate summer baseball in the Cape Cod Baseball League for the Yarmouth-Dennis Red Sox and was named a league all-star.

Drafted by the San Francisco Giants in the 11th round of the 1992 MLB amateur draft, Fonville made his Major League Baseball debut with the Montreal Expos on April 28, 1995, and appeared in his final game on July 9, 1999.

He is now a coach for White Oak High School in his hometown of Jacksonville, North Carolina.
