= Academy at Central =

American public secondary school in North Carolina

Location
- 700 Chestnut Drive; High Point, North Carolina 27262; United States; 35°57′22″N 80°01′21″W

Information
- Type: Public secondary
- Motto: A Small School Where Big Dreams Happen
- Established: 2006 (20 years ago)
- Principal: Howard Stimpson
- Faculty: 18
- Grades: 9–12
- Enrollment: 135
- Campus: Urban
- Website: www.academyatcentral.com

The Academy at Central is a public high school located in High Point, North Carolina. The school has a population of approximately 136 students in 9th–12th grades. The school's offerings include certification tracks in health care and information technology. The school offers certifications such as Certified Nursing Assistant, Microsoft Certified Application Specialist and Microsoft Certified IT Professional.

Since 2012, The Academy at Central has exceeded expected growth on North Carolina Standardized tests, and boasts a 100% graduation rate. Beginning in 2015 and again for 2016, The Academy at Central has been named one of the top high schools in the country for economically disadvantaged students by Newsweek magazine.

Founded in 2006, the Academy is a Guilford County Schools Early College. Students in 11th and 12th grade take college classes at Guilford Technical Community College in Jamestown or High Point and earn dual high school and college credit.
