= Pioneer Springs Community School =

Public charter school in North Carolina, US

Location
- 9232 Bob Beatty Rd (PO Box 480537), Charlotte, Mecklenburg County, North Carolina 28269; United States; 35.3461983°N 80.8225805°W

Information
- Type: Public Charter School K-11 (2022)
- Motto: Where Learning Comes Naturally
- Established: 2012
- Closed: Open
- Grades: Kindergarten-10
- Enrollment: 440 (2021)
- Average class size: 22 students
- Student to teacher ratio: 11:1
- Colors: Orange, Purple, Teal
- Slogan: Where learning comes naturally
- Mascot: Salamander
- Website: pioneersprings.org

Pioneer Springs Community School is the only nature-based, tuition-free public charter school located near Huntersville, North Charlotte and the UNCC area in the Charlotte metropolitan area, North Carolina, United States. The school is currently enrolling K-12.

== Founding ==
The school was founded in 2012 and was approved to be converted to a tuition-free public charter school in 2014.

== Pioneer Springs Community School Present ==
In the 2021–2022 school year, Pioneer Springs Community School has 440 students from kindergarten -10. The average class size is 22, resulting in a 11:1 student to teacher ratio enabling a close-knit school family community. Brand NEW High School Building will be complete Fall 2022. The new Middle School Building, known as "The Hive" opened in fall 2020.
