= Columbus County Schools =

School district in North Carolina, US

Location
- Columbus County, North Carolina United States

District information
- Type: Public
- Grades: PK–12
- Superintendent: Dr. Jesse E. Beck II
- Accreditation: AdvancED
- Schools: 17
- Budget: $ 49,444,221
- NCES District ID: 3700960

Students and staff
- Students: 5,673
- Teachers: 316
- Staff: 561
- Student–teacher ratio: 19:1

Other information
- Website: www.columbus.k12.nc.us

Columbus County Schools is a PK–12 graded school district serving Columbus County, North Carolina. Its 17 schools serve 5,673 students according to the August Average Daily Membership during 2018–19 school year.

== Student demographics ==
For the 2016–17 school year, Columbus County Schools had a total population of 5357 students and 398 teachers on a (FTE) basis. That same year, out of the student total, the gender ratio was 49.54% female to 50.46% male. The demographic group makeup was: Black, 29.9%; White, 52.65%; Hispanic, 10.11%; American Indian, 5.08%; and Asian/Pacific Islander, 0% (two or more races: 2.2%%). For the same school year, 59.88% were economically disadvantaged.

== Governance ==
The primary governing body of Columbus County Schools follows a council–manager government format with a five-member Board of Education appointing a Superintendent to run the day-to-day operations of the system. The school system currently resides in the North Carolina State Board of Education's Fourth District.

=== Board of education ===
The five members of the Board of Education are: Chris Worley, Irvin Enzor, Emily Grice, Ronnie Strickland, and Steve Long.

=== Superintendent ===
The current superintendent of the system is Jessie E Beck II . He was named as superintendent starting July 1, 2024. The previous superintendent was Deanne Meadows. She became superintendent in July 2019, and retired in June 2024. Meadows replaced Alan Faulk who retired from the school system in June of 2019.

== Member schools ==
Columbus County Schools has 12 schools ranging from pre-kindergarten to twelfth grade. Those 12 schools are separated into four high schools, four middle schools, and nine elementary schools.

=== High schools ===
- East Columbus Jr/Sr High School; grades 6-12 (Lake Waccamaw)
- South Columbus High School (Tabor City)
- Columbus Career and College Academy (Whiteville)
- West Columbus High School (Cerro Gordo)

=== Middle schools ===
- Nakina Middle School; grades 6-8 (Nakina)
- Tabor City School Grades; grades PK-8 (Tabor City)
- West Columbus School Grades; grades PK-8 (Cerro Gordo)
- Williams Township School; grades PK–8 (Whiteville)

=== Elementary schools ===
- Acme Delco Elementary School (Riegelwood)
- Hallsboro-Artesia Elementary School (Hallsboro)
- Old Dock Elementary School (Old Dock)

=== Closed schools ===
- Acme Delco Middle School (Delco)

== Athletics ==
According to the North Carolina High School Athletic Association, for the 2019–2020 school year:

- East and West Columbus are 1A schools in the Three Rivers Conference.
- South Columbus is a 2A school in Three Rivers Conference.
- Columbus Career and College Academy does not field athletic teams.

== Awards ==
Tabor City Middle School received the national American School Board Journal’s Magna Awards in 2011 based on their active REAL (Relevant, Engaging, Authentic Learning) program participation.

== See also ==
- List of school districts in North Carolina
