= Davie County Schools =

School district serving Davie County, North Carolina, U.S.

Location
- Davie County, North Carolina United States

District information
- Type: Public
- Grades: PK–12
- Superintendent: Jeff Wallace
- Schools: 12
- Budget: $ 57,890,000
- NCES District ID: 3701170

Students and staff
- Students: 6,200
- Teachers: 442.40 (on FTE basis)
- Staff: 461.35 (on FTE basis)
- Student–teacher ratio: 15.34:1

Other information
- Website: www.godavie.org

Davie County Schools is a PK–12 graded school district serving Davie County, North Carolina. Its twelve schools serve 6,200 students as of the 2019-20 school year.

== Student demographics ==
For the 2010–11 school year, Davie County Schools had a total population of 6,786 students and 442.40 teachers on a (FTE) basis. This produced a student-teacher ratio of 15.34:1 That same year, out of the student total, the gender ratio was 51% male to 49% female. The demographic group makeup was: White, 79%; Hispanic, 11%; Black, 6%; Asian/Pacific Islander, 1%; and American Indian, 0% (two or more races: 3%). For the same school year, 44.89% of the students received free and reduced-cost lunches.

== Governance ==
The primary governing body of Davie County Schools follows a council–manager government format, with a seven-member Board of Education appointing a Superintendent to run the day-to-day operations of the system. Prior to July 2012, the school board only consisted of six members. The school system currently resides in the North Carolina State Board of Education's Fifth District.

=== Board of education ===
The seven members of the Board of Education generally meet on the first Tuesday of each month. The current members of the board are: Clint Junker (Chair), Wendy Horne (Vice Chair), Paul Drechsler, Lori Smith, Dub Potts, Terry Hales, Sr., and David Carroll.

=== Superintendent ===
The current superintendent of the system is Mr. Jeff Wallace. . Dr. William Steed served as interim superintendent from January 2019 to May 2019. Dr. Darrin Hartness was previously the superintendent of Davie County Schools from 2011-2018. .

== Member schools ==
Davie County Schools has twelve schools ranging from pre-kindergarten to twelfth grade. Those twelve schools are separated into three high schools, three middle schools, and six elementary schools.

=== High schools ===
- Davie County High School (Mocksville)
- Davie County Early College High School (Mocksville)
- Central Davie Academy; alternative school, grades 6–12 (Mocksville)

=== Middle schools ===
- North Davie Middle School (Mocksville)
- South Davie Middle School (Mocksville)
- William Ellis Middle School (Advance)

=== Elementary schools ===
- Cooleemee Elementary School (Cooleemee)
- Cornatzer Elementary School (Mocksville)
- Mocksville Elementary School (Mocksville)
- Pinebrook Elementary School (Mocksville)
- Shady Grove Elementary School (Advance)
- William R Davie Elementary School (Mocksville)

== Awards ==
The Davie County Schools system has had one school listed as a Blue Ribbon School: North Davie Junior High (now, North Davie Middle School; 1984–85).

== See also ==
- List of school districts in North Carolina
