= B'nai Shalom Day School =

Jewish private school in North Carolina

Location
- 804-A Winview Drive; Greensboro, North Carolina 27410; United States; 36°05′37″N 79°51′23″W

Information
- Type: Private, Jewish day school
- Established: 1970 (56 years ago)
- President: Eryn Greenstein
- Head teacher: Eva Turner
- Grades: PK-8
- Gender: Co-Educational
- Colors: Blue & Olive
- Tuition: $6,790–$22,240 (2024-25)
- Website: bnai-shalom.org

B'nai Shalom Day School is an independent Jewish day school in Greensboro, North Carolina, United States serving Preschool (Infant-4years) to Eighth Grade children with small class sizes and focussed attention on the individual child.

B’nai Shalom’s Preschool nurtures children from 8 weeks old through Pre-K, offering a warm, engaging environment where young learners begin their journey of discovery. As the first step in our school-wide mission to inspire curiosity, critical-thinking, confidence, and a connection to Jewish values, our preschool program is intentionally designed to support the whole child—emotionally, socially, intellectually, and spiritually.

At B’nai Shalom Day School, our Lower School program is rooted in our mission to inspire curiosity, critical-thinking, confidence, and a connection to Jewish values. Serving students in Kindergarten through 4th grade, our intentionally small class sizes allow for personalized, differentiated instruction that meets each child where they are—academically, socially, and emotionally.

The B'nai Shalom Middle School includes grades 5 through 8, a time when students step more fully into themselves as learners, leaders, and compassionate community members. We’ve designed our Upper School program to challenge students academically, nurture them socially and emotionally, and encourage them to lead with Jewish values.

The school was founded in August 1970 as a Solomon Schechter Day School and originally called the North Carolina Hebrew Academy at Greensboro. In 1979, the name was changed to B’nai Shalom. In the 1980s, B’nai Shalom elected to join the Jewish Community Day School Network.
