= The Raleigh Latin School =

Location
- 1120 Sawmill Road; House Creek; Raleigh, Wake, North Carolina 27615; United States
- Coordinates: 35.886°N 78.666°W

Information
- School type: Secondary
- Denomination: Non-denominational Christianity
- Status: Closed
- Closed: 2008
- Staff: 1 administrator
- Teaching staff: 12 teachers
- Grades: PreK/PreCollege
- Years offered: 15
- Gender: Coeducational
- Age range: 4-19
- Campus type: Rural area

The Raleigh Latin School was a private classical non-denominational religious education secondary school in Raleigh, North Carolina. It closed in 2008 after four years in operation.
