= Trinity School of Durham and Chapel Hill =

School in North Carolina, US

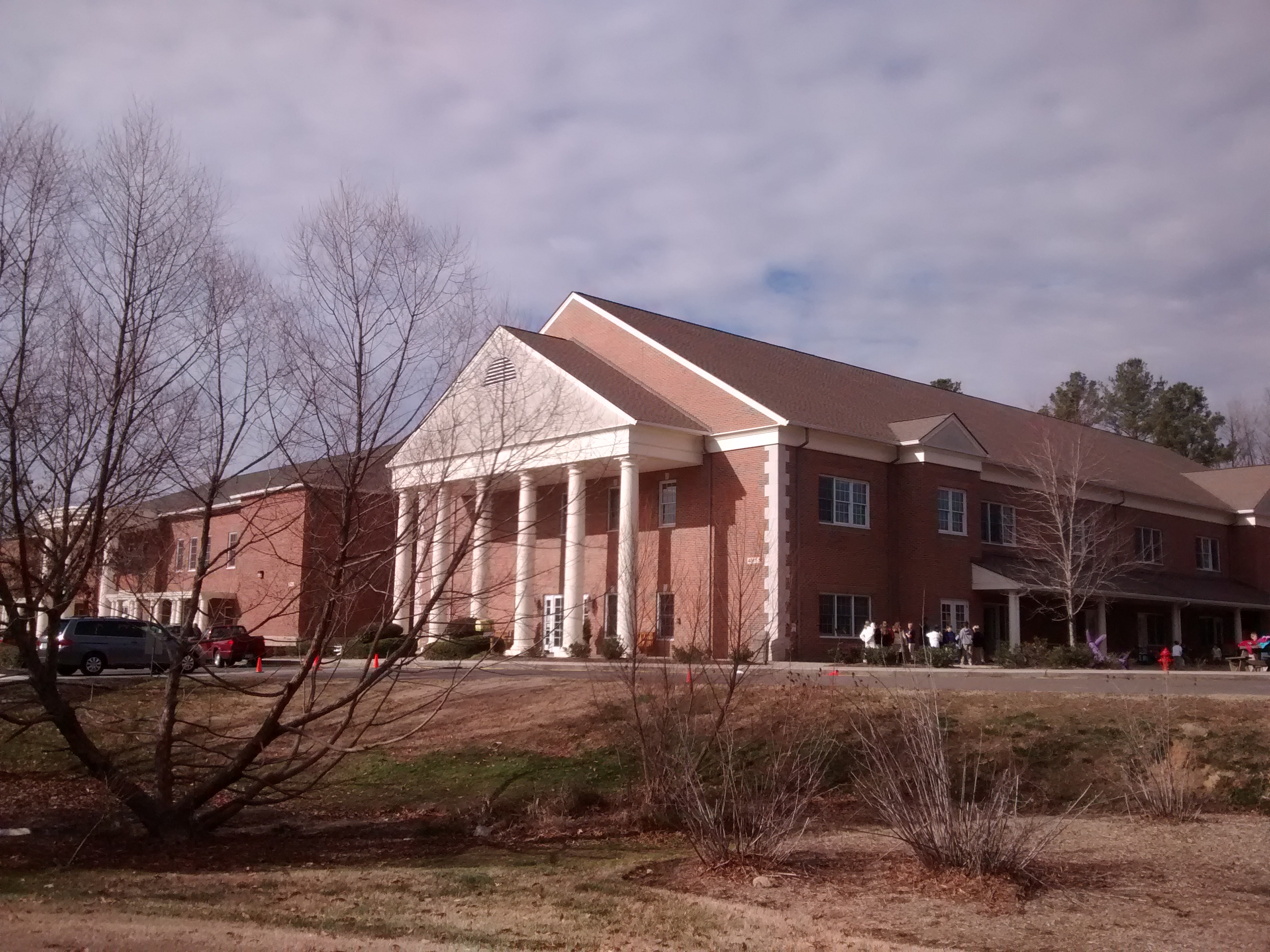
- Trinity School of Durham and Chapel Hill in 2014

Location
- 4011 Pickett Road; Durham, North Carolina 27705; United States; 35°58′33″N 78°59′43″W

Information
- Type: Private, college preparatory
- Motto: Not to us Lord(Non Nobis)
- Religious affiliation: Christian
- Established: 1995 (31 years ago)
- CEEB code: 341039
- Head of school: Chip Denton
- Grades: K–12
- Gender: Co-Educational
- Enrollment: 532
- Student to teacher ratio: 8:1
- Campus size: 22 acres
- Campus type: Suburban
- Colors: Blue and Gold
- Athletics: North Carolina Independent Schools Athletic Association (NCISAA)
- Athletics conference: Raleigh Area Athletic Conference (RAAC)
- Sports: 34 athletic teams
- Mascot: Lion
- Nickname: Lions
- Accreditation: CSI, SAIS
- Website: www.trinityschoolnc.org

Trinity School of Durham and Chapel Hill or simply, Trinity, is a private, college preparatory, Independent, Christian school located in Durham, North Carolina in the United States.

== History ==
Trinity School of Durham and Chapel Hill was founded in 1995. The school, offering grades kindergarten through high school, was built on a 22 acre-campus located on the border of Durham and Chapel Hill.

== Athletics ==
The Trinity School Athletics program offers three seasons of interscholastic sports for students in grades 6–12. Their mascot is Leo the Lion.

=== Fall ===
- Cross Country (co-ed)
- Soccer (boys)
- Tennis (girls) (state champions 2020, 2022)
- Volleyball (girls)
- Golf (girls)

=== Winter ===
- Basketball (girls and boys)
- Swim team (co-ed)
- Disc Golf (co-ed)

=== Spring ===
- Baseball (boys)
- Golf (boys)
- Soccer (girls)
- Tennis (boys)
- Track and Field (co-ed)
