= Onslow County Schools =

School district in North Carolina, USA

Onslow County Schools (OCS) is a PK-12 school district serving Onslow County, North Carolina. It is headquartered in Jacksonville.

OCS serves the majority of Onslow County, except for Camp Lejeune and Marine Corps Air Station New River, which are served by Department of Defense Education Activity (DoDEA) schools.

== Schools ==
=== Secondary ===
High schools:

- Dixon High School (Holly Ridge)
- Jacksonville High School (Jacksonville)
- Northside High School (Jacksonville)
- Richlands High School (Richlands)
- Southwest High School (Jacksonville)
- Swansboro High School (Swansboro)
- White Oak High School (Jacksonville)

Magnet high schools:

- Onslow Early College High School (Jacksonville)

Middle schools:

- Dixon Middle School (Sneads Ferry)
- Hunters Creek Middle School (Jacksonville)
- Jacksonville Commons Middle School (Jacksonville)
- New Bridge Middle School (Jacksonville)
- Northwoods Park Middle School (Jacksonville)
- Southwest Middle School (Jacksonville)
- Swansboro Middle School (Swansboro)
- Trexler Middle School (Richlands)

=== Primary and early childhood ===
Elementary schools:

- Bell Fork Elementary School (Jacksonville)
- Blue Creek Elementary School (Jacksonville)
- Carolina Forest International Elementary School (Jacksonville)
- Clear View Elementary School (Jacksonville)
- Clyde Erwin Elementary Magnet School of International Studies and Cultural Arts (Jacksonville)
- Coastal Elementary School (Holly Ridge)
- Dixon Elementary School (Sneads Ferry)
- Heritage Elementary School (Richlands)
- Hunters Creek Elementary School (Jacksonville)
- Jacksonville Commons Elementary School (Jacksonville)
- Meadow View Elementary School (Jacksonville)
- Morton Elementary School (Jacksonville)
- Northwoods Elementary School (Jacksonville)
- Parkwood Elementary School (Jacksonville)
- Queens Creek Elementary School (Swansboro)
- Richlands Elementary School (Richlands)
- Richlands Primary School (Richlands)
- Sand Ridge Elementary Elementary School (Hubert)
- Silverdale Elementary School (Maysville)
- Southwest Elementary School (Jacksonville)
- Stateside Elementary School (Jacksonville)
- Summersill Elementary School (Jacksonville)
- Swansboro Elementary School (Swansboro)
- Woodland Elementary School (Maysville)

Preschool:

- Thompson Early Childhood Center (Jacksonville)

=== Other ===
- Onslow County Learning Center (Hubert)
