= Macon County Schools (North Carolina) =

School district in North Carolina

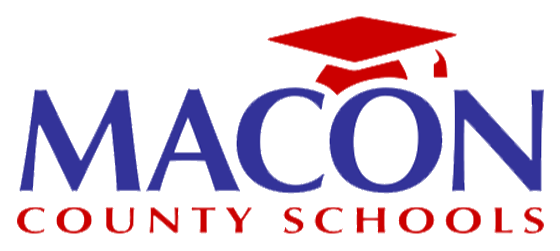

Address
- 1202 Old Murphy Road Franklin, North Carolina, 28734; United States

District information
- Grades: Pre-Kindergarten – 12
- Superintendent: Josh Lynch
- Schools: 12
- Budget: $51,800,000
- NCES District ID: 3702760

Students and staff
- Enrollment: 4,450 (2022–23)
- Faculty: 335.06 (FTE)

Other information
- Website: macon.k12.nc.us

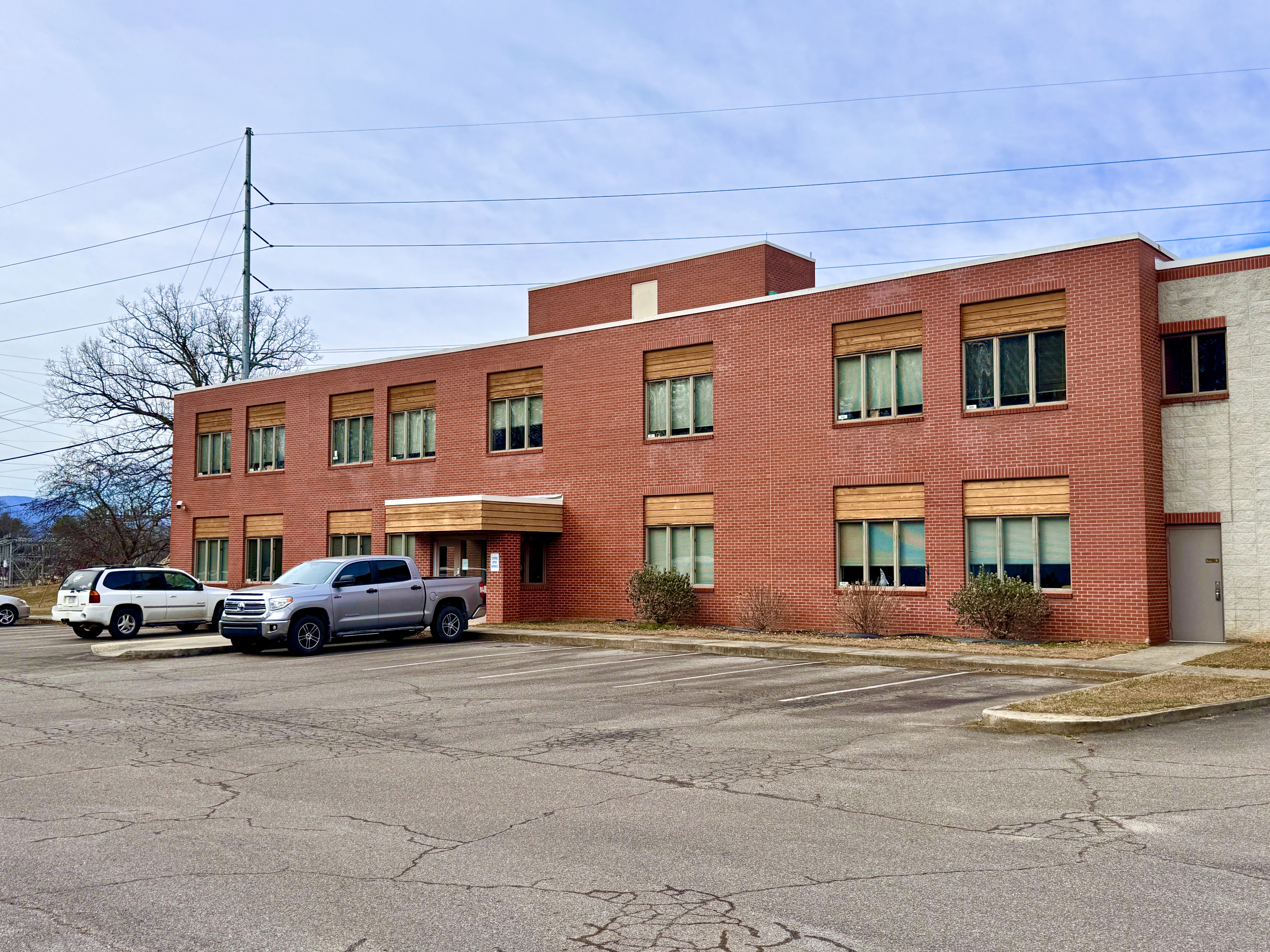
Macon County Schools main office in Franklin

Macon County Schools manages the public school system in Macon County, North Carolina. It incorporates three districts with about 4,450 students attending a total of 12 separate schools. The district employs 335 classroom teachers as of 2023, with a student-to-teacher ratio of 13.28 to 1. As of 2023, the district's annual budget is $51.8 million, or $11,888 per student.

The district is run by the Macon County Schools superintendent. The current superintendent is former Josh Lynch. The present school board has five members who are elected by popular vote to a four-year term.

== Schools and facilities ==
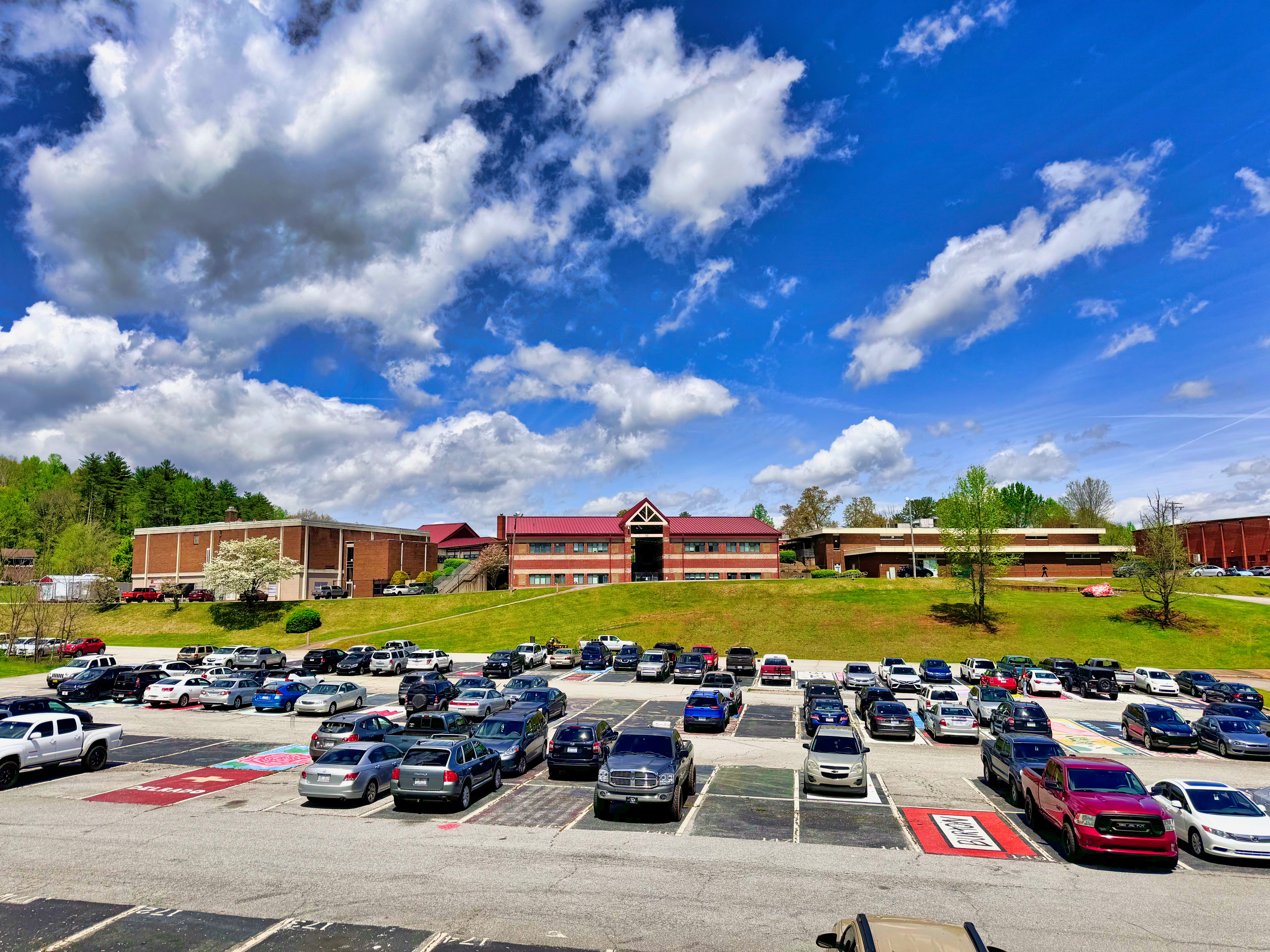
Franklin High School's campus

=== Elementary schools ===
- Cartoogechaye Elementary in Franklin
- East Franklin Elementary
- Iotla Valley Elementary in Franklin
- South Macon Elementary in Franklin

=== Intermediate and middle schools ===
- Macon Middle School in Franklin
- Mountain View Intermediate School in Franklin

=== High schools ===
- Bartram Academy in Franklin is an alternative high school serving students in grades 7–12. It was known as Union Academy until 2023. The mascot is the Explorers. The graduation rate is about 60 percent.
- Franklin High School was built in 1952 and serves grades 9–12. Its mascot is the panther. The school district is currently planning to demolish the existing campus and construct a modern 265,000-square-foot three-story school on the same land. The new campus would support up to 1,400 students. The estimated cost for the project is about $110 million.

=== Other schools ===
- Highlands School serves students in K-12 grades.
- Nantahala School serves students in K-12 grades.
- Macon Early College in Franklin
