= Bladen County Schools =

School district in North Carolina, United States

Location
- Bladen County, North Carolina United States

District information
- Type: Public
- Grades: PK–12
- Superintendent: Jason Atkinson
- Accreditations: Southern Association of Colleges and Schools
- Schools: 14
- Budget: $ 54,051,000
- NCES District ID: 3700390

Students and staff
- Students: 5,360
- Teachers: 359.92 (on FTE basis)
- Staff: 416.90 (on FTE basis)
- Student–teacher ratio: 14.89:1

Other information
- Website: www.bladen.k12.nc.us

Bladen County Schools is a PK–12 graded school district serving Bladen County, North Carolina. Its 14 schools serve 5,360 students as of the 2010–2011 school year.

== History ==
The history of public education in Bladen County began shortly after the state passed its first common school law in 1839. The state was then divided into several school districts. In August 1839, voters in Bladen County approved a measure establishing a school system in the county. The system started growing, and by 1900, there were 11 schools functioning in the county.

By the 1966–67 school year, the segregated Bladen County Schools was operating nine schools for black students and eight schools for white students. Integration and school consolidation movements developed that year and by 1971, the system was fully integrated.

== Student demographics ==
For the 2010–2011 school year, Bladen County Schools had a total population of 5,360 students and 359.92 teachers on a (FTE) basis. This produced a student-teacher ratio of 14.89:1. That same year, out of the student total, the gender ratio was 51% male to 49% female. The demographic group makeup was: Black, 42%; White, 41%; Hispanic, 12%; American Indian, 1%; and Asian/Pacific Islander, 0% (two or more races: 4%). For the same school year, 75.80% of the students received free and reduced-cost lunches.

== Governance ==
The primary governing body of Bladen County Schools follows a council–manager government format with a nine-member Board of Education (also called the Bladen County Public School Board) appointing a Superintendent to run the day-to-day operations of the system. The school system currently resides in the North Carolina State Board of Education's Fourth District.

=== Board of education ===
Some of the nine members of the Board of Education are elected by district, others are at-large members elected by the whole county. They serve four-year terms of office. The current members of the board are:

==== District 1 ====
- Glenn McKoy
- Gary Rhoda

==== District 2 ====
- Roger Carroll
- Tim Benton (Board Vice Chair)

==== District 3 ====
- Chris Clark
- Alan T. West

==== At-large ====
- Dennis Edwards
- Cory Singletary
- Vinston Rozier (Board Chair)

=== Superintendent ===
Jason Atkinson has been the superintendent for the Bladen County Schools since March 15, 2021, succeeding Robert Taylor who went on to take the position of Deputy State Superintendent at the N.C. Department of Public Instruction. Jason Atkinson has been given the 2021 Dr. Samuel Houston Leadership Award and was selected as an honoree of the Modern Governance 100 for Community Boards program.

== Member schools ==
Bladen County Schools has 14 schools ranging from pre-kindergarten to twelfth grade. Those 14 schools are separated into three high schools (including one alternative school), four middle schools, and seven elementary schools.

=== High schools ===
- East Bladen High School (Elizabethtown)
- West Bladen High School (Bladenboro)
- School of Extended Hope – alternative school; 5–12 grade (Elizabethtown)

=== Middle schools ===
- Bladenboro Middle School (Bladenboro)
- Clarkton School of Discovery (Clarkton)
- Elizabethtown Middle School (Elizabethtown)
- Tar Heel Middle School (Tar Heel)

=== Elementary schools ===
- Bladen Lakes Primary School (Elizabethtown)
- Bladenboro Primary School (Bladenboro)
- Booker T. Washington Primary School (Clarkton)
- Dublin Primary School (Dublin)
- East Arcadia Elementary School (Riegelwood)
- Elizabethtown Primary School (Elizabethtown)
- Plain View Primary School (Tar Heel)

== Athletics ==
According to the North Carolina High School Athletic Association, for the 2012–2013 school year both East and West Bladen high schools are 2A schools in the Waccamaw Conference.

== See also ==
- List of school districts in North Carolina
