= Havelock High School =

American public school in North Carolina

Location
- 101 Webb Blvd; Havelock, North Carolina 28352; United States
- Coordinates: 34°52′50″N 76°53′37″W

Information
- School type: Public
- Established: 1956 (70 years ago)
- School district: Craven County Schools
- CEEB code: 341738
- Principal: Claudia Casey
- Teaching staff: 43.77 (FTE)
- Grades: 9–12
- Enrollment: 1,014 (2024-2025)
- Student to teacher ratio: 23.17
- Colors: Black and white
- Athletics: NCHSAA 5A
- Mascot: Ram
- Rivals: New Bern High School
- Yearbook: The Rampage
- Website: hhs.cravenk12.org

Havelock High School is a public high school located in Havelock, North Carolina, founded in 1956. Havelock is one of three high schools operated by the Craven County School District.

The original campus is now the site of Havelock Middle School, and the current campus was built in 1971. It has been expanded several times since. Serving grades 9–12, the school is one of three high schools in the Craven County Schools district. Students who attend Havelock High are living in the areas of Havelock, MCAS Cherry Point and Harlowe, with some students occasionally living in neighboring New Bern or James City.

Jeff Murphy was principal from 2005 until he retired in 2019, The current principal is Claudia Casey.

== Athletics ==
Havelock High School offers a wide range of athletics including football, Men's and Women's wrestling, basketball, baseball, softball, etc. They are members of the North Carolina High School Athletic Association (NCHSAA). The mascot of the high school is the ram and the colors are black and white, while gold and silver are tertiary and quaternary. Havelock High School's rivals include New Bern High School and West Craven High School.

The baseball team were 3A state champions in 1998. The football team won three consecutive 3A State Championships in 2011, 2012, and 2013. The boys cross country team were 3A state champions in 1997. The wrestling team were 3A dual team state champions in 1997 and 3A state tournament team champions in 1996, 1997, and 2001. The wrestling team picked up its first-ever Men's and Women's Individual 5A State Champions in the same season in 2026.

== Notable alumni ==
- Ky Bowman, NBA player
- Bruce Carter, NFL linebacker
- Pharoh Cooper, NFL wide receiver and return specialist, Pro Bowl selection in 2017
- William M. Faulkner, United States Marine Corps Lieutenant General
- Corey Robinson, NFL offensive tackle
- Kendal Vickers, NFL defensive lineman
- Guy Whimper, NFL offensive tackle, Super Bowl XLII champion with the New York Giants
