= Jackson Community School =

American public alternative school in North Carolina

Location
- 3370 Skyland Drive; Sylva, North Carolina 28779; United States
- 35°24′15″N 83°09′50″W

Information
- School type: Public alternative school (U.S.)
- Established: 2002 (24 years ago)
- School district: Jackson County Public Schools
- Principal: Heather Reidinger
- Faculty: 8.50 (FTE)
- Enrollment: 69 (2023–2024)
- Student to teacher ratio: 8.12
- Campus type: Rural
- Colors: Cardinal and Gray
- Mascot: Phoenix
- Website: www.jcpsnc.org/jcsa

The Jackson Community School is an alternative school in Jackson County, North Carolina for grades K–12 which serves students who need a smaller setting to access scholastic success. It seeks to serve all students with individualized attention built on trauma informed practices and seeks to prepare all graduates for employment, enrollment, or enlistment. It opened in the old Scotts Creek School, built in 1951, in 2002 after the new Scotts Creek Elementary School opened in 2001. The building received several renovations when it was converted into the HUB. It is the oldest school building still in use as a school in the county. It is located on old US 19/23 in the Addie Community and the campus borders Scotts Creek. When it opened it was a state-of-the-art facility, and didn't require blinds because the building was positioned at such an angle that the sun would always be overhead and would never directly shine into the classrooms windows. The building has two floors on the backside and one floor on the front. A small addition was added to the middle section of the school in the 1970s or 1980s. The Gym/Auditorium is small by modern standards, as the sideline was the wall. The new school that replaced Scotts Creek has a separate Gym and Auditorium, both of which are relatively large when compared to the old Gym/Auditorium. The school is the smallest school in the district and it is also one of the most recently established.
