= Southeast Guilford High School =

American public school in North Carolina

Location
- 4530 Southeast School Road; Greensboro, North Carolina 27406; United States; 35°58′21″N 79°41′52″W

Information
- Type: Public
- Motto: Inspire, Motivate, and Educate
- Established: 1962 (64 years ago)
- CEEB code: 341580
- Principal: Christopher Scott
- Faculty: 120
- Teaching staff: 77.83 (FTE)
- Grades: 9–12
- Enrollment: 1,236 (2023–2024)
- Student to teacher ratio: 15.88
- Schedule type: Block
- Colors: Orange and black
- Mascot: Freddy the Falcon
- Nickname: Falcons
- Website: southeasths.gcsnc.com

Southeast Guilford High School is a public high school located in southeast Guilford County, off U.S. Route 421. Southeast High School is part of the Guilford County School System. Southeast High School is located near Forest Oaks Country Club, former site of the Wyndham Championship.

The campus consists of two main buildings and numerous mobile units for classrooms, including a new cafeteria. The school also has a football stadium, soccer field, marching field, baseball field, track, tennis courts, wrestling room, and a weight room.

Southeast accommodates about 1,400 students. The state's schools average about 989 students, and schools in the Guilford County School District (GCSD) average to 911 students. Southeast Guilford falls below the other enrollment percentages of other schools for Advanced Placement (AP) classes in the district by 2%, but exceeds the state enrollment by 1% (5% enrollment for SEHS, 7% GCSD, 4% NC). Southeast also has a 15% enrollment in College Technical Prep courses, while GCSD has 13% of their students enrolled, and North Carolina has approximately 16% enrollment.

== Athletics ==
=== Sport teams ===
- Track
- Cross Country
- Swimming
- Lacrosse
- Golf
- Basketball
- Soccer
- Tennis
- Cheerleading
- Football
- Baseball
- Wrestling
- Softball
- Volleyball
- Flag football

== Notable alumni ==
- Eugene Godsoe (2006), former competitive swimmer who competed at the 2013 World Aquatics Championships
- Shane Hmiel (1998), former NASCAR and USAC driver
- Devin Sweet (2014), MLB pitcher

== Sources ==
- Official website
