= The Community Learning Center at Pinckney =

Pinckney Academy

Location
- 160 Pinckney Rd; Carthage, North Carolina 28327; United States
- Coordinates: 35°20′25″N 79°25′36″W

Information
- Type: Public 4-year
- Established: Late 1990s
- Principal: Robin Liles
- Faculty: 17
- Colors: Orange and black
- Mascot: Tiger
- Website: clc.ncmcs.org

Pinckney Academy is an alternative Middle School and High School in Carthage, North Carolina. It is a part of the Moore County public schools system. Previously, the school was different from the other traditional schools in the county. Up until the 2009–2010 school year, it offered high school students only to seek credit hours under independent study. This meant that a student could get credit for a course as soon as he/she is finished with the two packets per course the instructor provides for the student. In addition, there is no lecture for the student as he or she is self-teaching the subject on their own. Inside the packet has assignments that the student would have to complete by reading the textbook first then answer the questions from the assignment. A grade below 70 would not acceptable where the student would have to re-do the assignment until a satisfactory grade is made. This is different from the traditional school where a course lasts a semester or a year long which would include a teacher doing a lecture for the course. Since the 2009–2010 school year, the curriculum has gone back to the traditional way as the other schools are in the county.

== History ==
In the beginning, the school was known as MCSAT up until the late 1990s. Then for a short time until the end of the 2000–2001 school year, it was known as Moore Central before the name changed again to Pinckney Academy. The facility used to be located at the present day Mac's Anytime breakfast on US Highway 15/501 in Carthage. It discontinued using that building sometime in 2001. It is now located just off Dowd Road on Pinckney Street in Carthage. Beginning with the 2009–2010 school year, it has added a Middle School for students. It only has 51 total students at Pinckney Academy.
