= Macon Early College =

American early college school in North Carolina

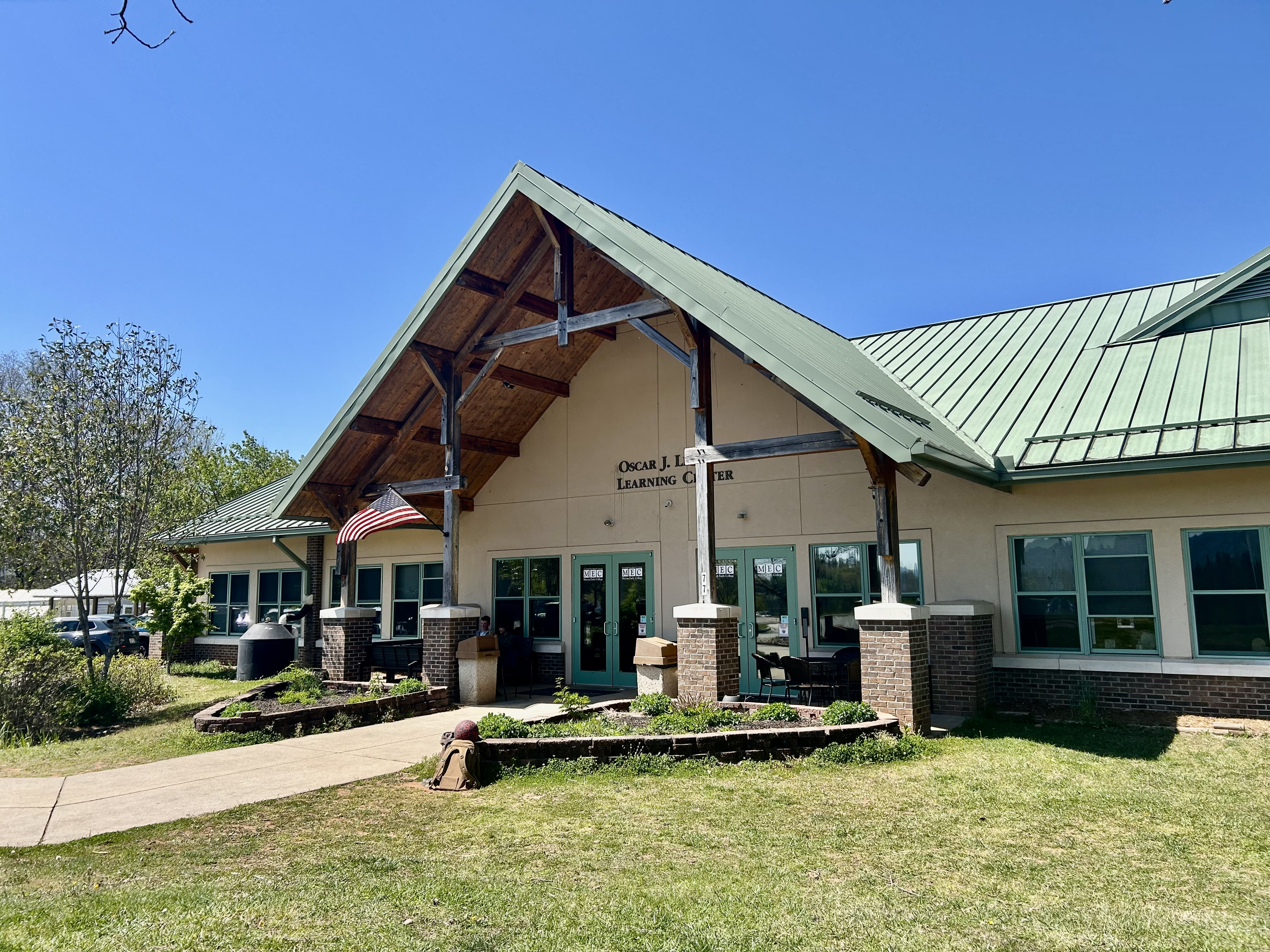

Location
- 77 Siler Farm Road; Franklin, North Carolina 28734; United States
- Coordinates: 35°09′35″N 83°22′53″W

Information
- School type: Early college Public
- Motto: College, Career, and Life
- Established: 2006
- School district: Macon County
- CEEB code: 341371
- Principal: Caleb Parham
- Grades: 9–13
- Colors: Blue and white
- Mascot: Foxes
- Website: https://mec.macon.k12.nc.us/

The Macon Early College high school is part of the early college program. It is located next to the Macon County branch of Southwestern Community College and Macon County's public library in Franklin, NC. Southwestern Community College is a partner to Macon Early College in that college courses are taken as a student of both schools. As of 2008 SCC has been ranked 4th in the list of America's best community colleges. It is one of the three high schools in the Macon area, including Franklin High School and Union Academy. This program was designed to enhance and enrich a student's educational career by providing the opportunity to earn both a high school diploma and associate degree.

== Opening ==
The school opened without a dedicated building and found its home at the former Cartoogechaye Elementary School in 2005. In 2007 MEC's staff and students were relocated in 2007 to the new SCC Macon Campus. Since then, a new building was dedicated for the school's students and staff to separate the Early College from the Community College attendees. This new building was located directly across the street from the SCC campus and closer to the Macon County Public Library. The school has received much praise since its introduction to the area, primarily in regard to the accelerated educational tract including college credit, small class sizes, and enriching environment.

== Student learning devices ==
While previous years included sole use of laptops, current administration of the schools allow for use of iPads as well as laptops for classes that are incompatible with the more mobile solution. In 2019 no charge has been given to students, however, students in earlier years have been charged $25 per student due to computer repair expenses and new equipment for the computers. These laptops were supplied by the 1:1 Laptop Pilot charity program. iPads were supplied by the Macon County School system in order to match other high schools in the area.
