= Middle College High School (Durham, North Carolina) =

Middle College High School at Durham Technical Community College

Location
- 1616 Cooper St. Durham, North Carolina 27703; United States
- 35°58′28″N 78°52′51″W

Information
- Type: Public
- Established: 2005 (21 years ago)
- School district: Durham Public Schools
- CEEB code: 341042
- Principal: Marcia Navarro
- Teaching staff: 7.50 (FTE)
- Enrollment: 134 (2023–2024)
- Student to teacher ratio: 17.87
- Colors: Blue and white
- Mascot: Maverick
- Website: dpsnc.net/domain/53

Middle College High School at Durham Technical Community College, often abbreviated Middle College High School@DTCC or MCHS@DTCC, is a public high school located in Durham, North Carolina. It is part of the Durham Public Schools system. Middle College High School is located on the campus of Durham Technical Community College.

== Students ==
Matriculation is offered to only juniors and seniors. Students may take both high school and college classes at no cost to students. Students are accepted from three school districts: Durham Public Schools, Orange County Schools, and Chapel Hill-Carrboro City Schools.
