= Research Triangle High School =

American charter school in North Carolina

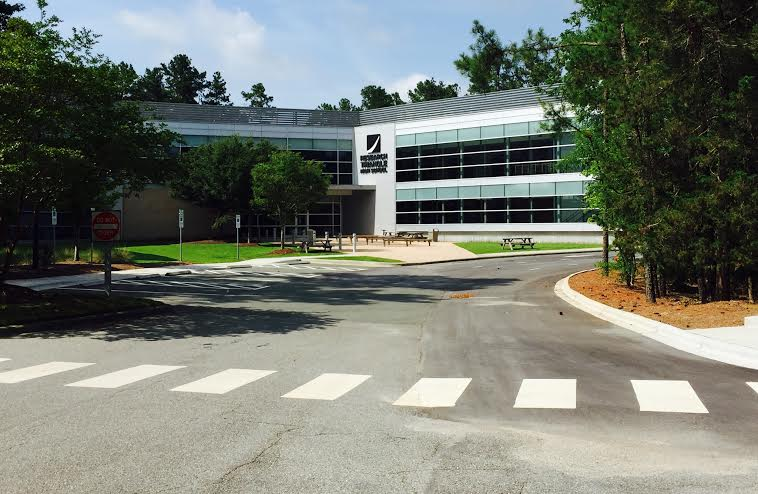

Location
- 3106 East N.C. Highway 54; Durham, North Carolina 27713; United States
- 35°53′42″N 78°52′27″W

Information
- Type: Charter
- Established: 2012 (14 years ago)
- Chief School Officer: Akiba Griffin
- Teaching staff: 43 (FTE)
- Grades: 9–12
- Enrollment: 571 (2025–2026)
- Student to teacher ratio: 13.55
- Colors: Forest green and silver
- Mascot: Raptors
- Website: researchtrianglehighschool.org

Research Triangle High School, commonly abbreviated RTHS, is a charter school with a STEM focus located in Research Triangle Park, North Carolina. The school opened in August 2012 with an initial class of 160 freshmen, and now enrolls approximately 590 students in grades 9–12.

== Academics ==
Research Triangle High School uses a personalized learning method. Students follow a mastery model for content learning and spend much of their time applying this knowledge in projects. This model is designed to develop the cognitive skills necessary to develop students into strong, self-directed learners who can not only get into college, but succeed in them as well.

The curriculum is aligned with the Common Core State Standards Initiative and the North Carolina Essential Standards. All teachers at the school implement the Flipped Classroom method of recording lectures to be viewed by students outside of class, allowing for more hands-on instruction during class time. Students at RTHS learn to critically analyze sources and also share their research with others.

RTHS offers Advanced Placement courses in Biology, Calculus, Chemistry, Computer Science, Environmental Science, European History, English Language and Composition, English Literature and Composition, Spanish, Statistics, United States History, World History, and Psychology, as well as a college-level U.S. Government and Politics course.

== Athletics ==
Research Triangle High School is a member of the North Carolina High School Athletic Association (NCHSAA) and are classified as a 2A school. The school is a part of the Diamond Nine 1A/2A/3A Conference. Research Triangle athletics programs are known as the Raptors.

RTHS fields teams in boys' and girls' cross country, boys' and girls' soccer, boys' and girls' basketball, boys' and girls' track and field, boys' and girls' tennis, boys' and girls' swimming, boys' and girls' golf, and girls' volleyball. With no athletic facilities on campus, RTHS partners with local organizations for practice and event space.

As of 2022, RTHS's athletic programs have captured 24 conference championships and three team state championships: boys' tennis (2019), girls' cross country (2019), and girls' tennis (2025), to go along with numerous individual state championships in tennis, swimming, and track and field.

== Controversy ==
The original building that RTHS occupied from 2012 to 2015. The building was demolished in 2020.

The Durham County School Board and the Durham City Council had both previously voted to oppose the charter, citing concerns of lower-income accessibility. Proponents of the high school, however, explained that the school plans to target the area's diversity of race, gender, and economic background. A public forum held on February 13, 2012 allowed area residents to voice their opinions about the proposed charter. The response was generally positive. Despite Durham Public Schools' opposition, the school's charter was approved by the North Carolina State Board of Education on March 1, 2012.

== Principals ==
- Eric Grunden (2012-2022)
- Chris Elliott (2022-2023)
- Akiba Griffin (2023–Present)
