= Duplin County Schools =

School district in North Carolina, United States

Location
- Duplin County, North Carolina United States

District information
- Type: Public
- Motto: A unified approach to academic excellence
- Grades: PK–12
- Superintendent: Austin Obasohan
- Schools: 16
- Budget: $ 83,831,000
- NCES District ID: 3701200

Students and staff
- Students: 9,145
- Teachers: 609.09 (on FTE basis)
- Staff: 654.09 (on FTE basis)
- Student–teacher ratio: 15.01:1

Other information
- Website: www.duplinschools.net

Duplin County Schools is a PK–12 graded school district serving Duplin County, North Carolina. Its 16 schools serve 9,145 students as of the 2010–11 school year.

== Student demographics ==
For the 2010–11 school year, Duplin County Schools had a total population of 9,145 students and 609.09 teachers on a (FTE) basis. This produced a student-teacher ratio of 15.01:1. That same year, out of the student total, the gender ratio was 52% male to 48% female. The demographic group makeup was: White, 38%; Hispanic, 34%; Black, 27%; American Indian, 1%; and Asian/Pacific Islander, 0% (two or more races: 1%). For the same school year, 73.63% of the students received free and reduced-cost lunches.

== Governance ==
The primary governing body of Duplin County Schools follows a council–manager government format with a six-member Board of Education appointing a Superintendent to run the day-to-day operations of the system. The school system currently resides in the North Carolina State Board of Education's Second District.

=== Board of education ===
There are five members on the board of education. Board of education members are elected by district in staggered four-year terms. The current members of the board are: Brent Davis (Chair), Hubert E. Bowden, David Jones, Pamela Edwards and S. Reginald Kenan.

=== Superintendent ===
Duplin County Schools has had a couple of people serve long tenures as superintendent. C. H. Yelverton was the superintendent from 1967 until his death in 1981. Upon his death, L. S. Guy, Jr., was named the superintendent. He remained in the position from 1981 until his retirement in 1999. Tommy Benson was appointed in July 1999 and retired in 2006. That year Wiley Doby (previously superintendent at the Rowan-Salisbury School System) took over as school leader. Doby served until 2010 when a parents group formed to try to oust him. He declined to seek a contract renewal that year.

The current superintendent of the system is Austin Obasohan. He became superintendent in 2010. Obasohan was previously superintendent of Selma City Schools in Selma, Alabama.

== Member schools ==
Duplin County Schools has 16 schools ranging from pre-kindergarten to twelfth grade. Those 16 schools are separated into five high schools, three middle schools, and eight elementary schools.

=== High schools ===
- Duplin Early College High School (Kenansville)
- East Duplin High School (Beulaville)
- James Kenan High School (Warsaw)
- North Duplin Junior-Senior High School; grades 7–12 (Mount Olive)
- Wallace-Rose Hill High School (Teachey)

=== Middle schools ===
- Charity Middle School (Rose Hill)
- E.E. Smith Middle School (Kenansville)
- Warsaw Middle School (Warsaw)

=== Elementary schools ===
- B. F. Grady Elementary School (Albertson)
- Beulaville Elementary School (Beulaville)
- Chinquapin Elementary School (Chinquapin)
- Kenansville Elementary School (Kenansville)
- North Duplin Elementary School (Mount Olive)
- Rose Hill Magnolia Elementary School (Rose Hill)
- Wallace Elementary School (Wallace)
- Warsaw Elementary School (Warsaw)

== Athletics ==
According to the North Carolina High School Athletic Association, for the 2012–2013 school year:

- East Duplin James Kenan and Wallace-Rose Hill are a 2A school in the East Central Conference.
- North Duplin is a 1A school in the Carolina Conference
- The early college does not have athletic teams.

== See also ==
- List of school districts in North Carolina
