= Longleaf School of the Arts =

American public charter school in North Carolina

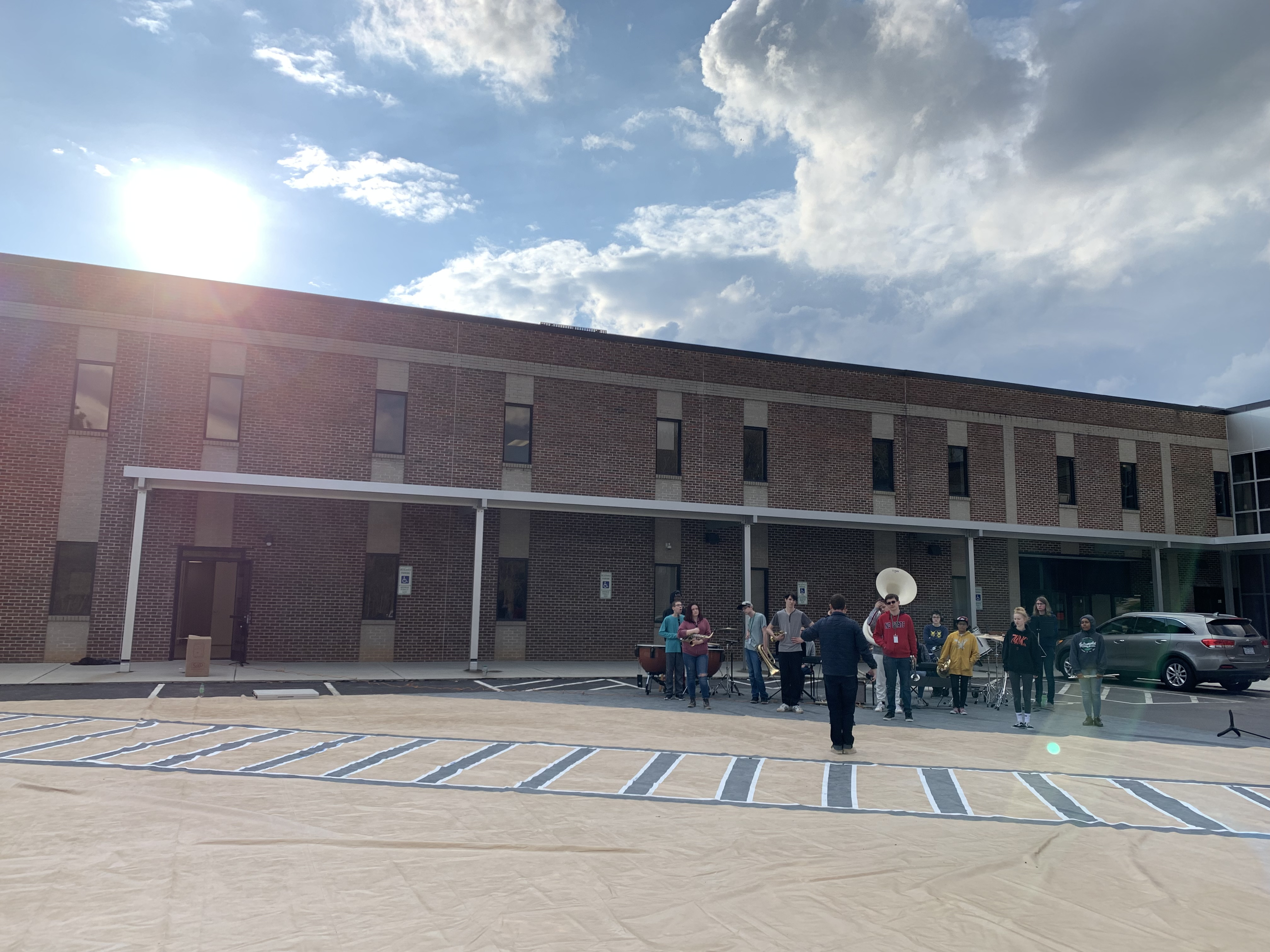

Location
- 322 Chapanoke Rd; Raleigh, North Carolina 27603; United States
- 35°44′10″N 78°38′50″W

Information
- Type: Public charter school
- Established: 2013 (13 years ago)
- CEEB code: 343220
- Head of school: Johneka Williams
- Teaching staff: 32.00 (FTE)
- Employees: 39
- Grades: 9–12
- Enrollment: 405 (2024–2025)
- Student to teacher ratio: 12.66
- Mascot: Flying Squirrel
- Website: www.longleafschool.org

Longleaf School of the Arts is a college preparatory charter high school in Raleigh, North Carolina, established in 2013. The school enrolls incoming freshman, sophomores and juniors. Longleaf has 400+ students as of the 2022–2023 school year with a roster of 20+ full-time teachers. Longleaf's offered arts include: Visual Art, Literary Arts, Dance, Chorus, Band, Orchestra, and Theatre. The foreign languages offered are French and Spanish.
