= Hubert, North Carolina =

- Unincorporated community
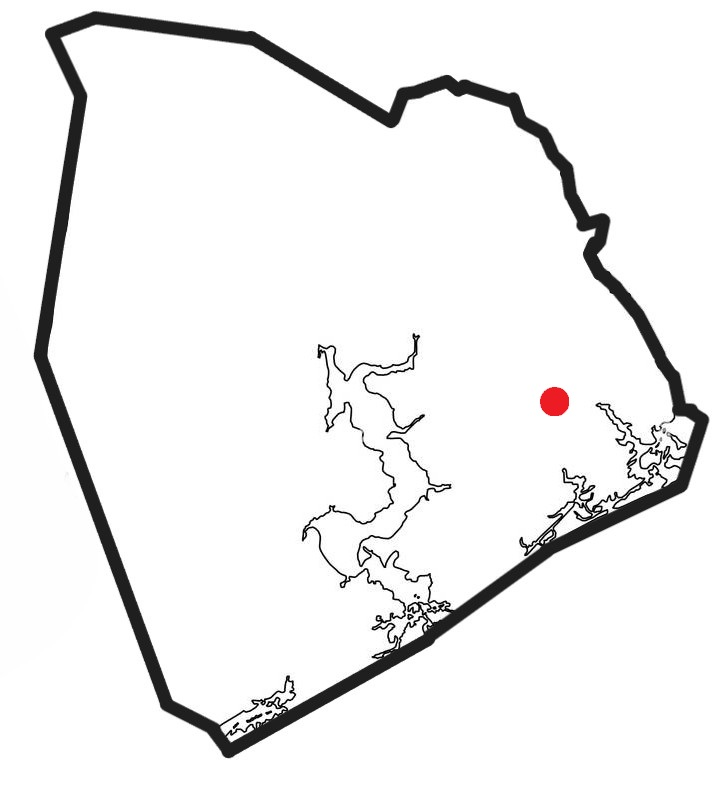
- Location within Onslow County

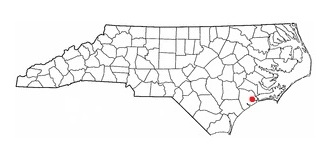
- Location within the U.S. state of North Carolina
- Coordinates: 34°42′50″N 77°14′43″W
- Country: United States
- State: North Carolina
- County: Onslow

Area
  - Total: 48.96 sq mi (126.8 km^{2})
- Elevation: 33 ft (10 m)

Population
  - Estimate (2024): 20,280
- Time zone: UTC-5 (EST)
  - Summer (DST): UTC-4 (EDT)
- ZIP code(s): 28539
- Area code(s): 910, 472
- GNIS feature ID: 1020853

Hubert is an unincorporated community located in Onslow County, North Carolina, United States. The community is located west of Swansboro. Hubert is part of the Jacksonville, NC Metropolitan Statistical Area.

In 2024, the population estimate was 20,280.

== Geography ==
Hubert is located in southeastern Onslow County. The northeastern side of Marine Corps Base Camp Lejeune borders the community. The main roads in Hubert are Freedom Way, Hubert Boulevard, Sand Ridge Road, Riggs Road, and Queens Creek Road.

The ZIP Code for Hubert is 28539.

According to the United States Census Bureau, the Hubert ZIP Code has an area of 48.96 square miles.

== Law and government ==
=== Jurisdiction ===
Because the community is within the unincorporated portion of Onslow, it is served by the Onslow County Sheriff's Office and Onslow County emergency medical services.

=== Crime ===
In 2019, Hubert had a violent crime rate of 30.6 per 100,000. This was above the national average of 22.7 per 100,000.

In 2019, Hubert had a property crime rate of 40.1 per 100,000. This was above the national average of 35.4 per 100,000.
