= Charlotte Islamic Academy =

Location
- 5500 North Tryon Street; Charlotte, North Carolina 28075; United States
- Coordinates: 35°15′41″N 80°46′26″W

Information
- Type: Private
- CEEB code: 340726
- Principal: Alaa Alshaikh
- Grades: Pre-K–12
- Website: www.ciacademy.us

Charlotte Islamic Academy was the first Islamic institution established in Charlotte, North Carolina. The school opened in 1998 at the site of the Charlotte Islamic Center.
