= Charlotte United Christian Academy =

American Christian private school in North Carolina

Coordinates: 35.1688°N 80.7461°W

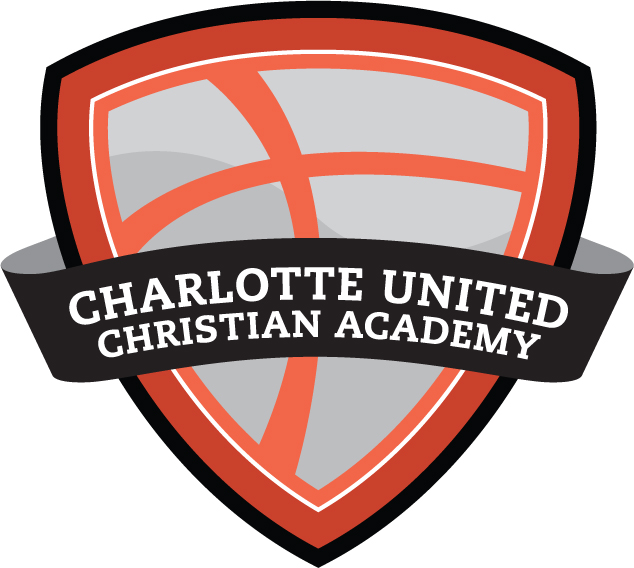
- Charlotte United Christian Academy Logo

Location
- 7640 Wallace Road; Charlotte; NC 28212; United States

Information
- Type: Private Christian School
- Established: 2009
- Principal: Janet Atwell
- Staff: 38
- Faculty: 7
- Grades: Preschool-12
- Enrollment: 150
- Campus size: Medium Size
- Campus type: Suburban
- Colors: orange and red
- Athletics: Basketball, Soccer, Cross Country, Volleyball
- Athletics conference: CACAA
- Mascot: Warriors
- Affiliation: Christian
- Website: cucawarriors.com

Charlotte United Christian Academy is a private Christian school in Charlotte, North Carolina. It was founded in 2009 by Resurrection Church and Garr Church.

== Academic associations ==
Charlotte United is part of the Greater Charlotte Association of Christian Schools and the Association of Christian Schools International.

== Fine arts ==
Charlotte United has fine arts programs. The performing arts department has produced multiple musicals. The visual arts department has produced art shows hosted by Charlotte-area museums.
