= White Oak High School (North Carolina) =

American public school in North Carolina

Location
- 1001 Piney Green Road; Jacksonville, North Carolina 28546; United States; 34°46′09″N 77°20′56″W

Information
- Type: Public
- Motto: We All Row!
- Established: August 1927; 99 years ago
- School district: Onslow County Schools
- CEEB code: 342565
- Principal: Joycelyn Cassidy
- Grades: 9–12
- Enrollment: 1,101 (2017)
- Colors: Green and gold
- Athletics conference: Big Carolina 6A/7A
- Mascot: Vikings
- Newspaper: Viking Views
- Yearbook: The Viking Log
- Website: wohs.onslow.k12.nc.us

White Oak High School is a public high school located in Jacksonville, North Carolina. It is classified as a 6A school by the North Carolina High School Athletic Association, and is one of the seven high schools of Onslow County Schools.

== History ==
White Oak High School opened and was accredited for the issuance of high school diplomas in August 1927. The first class graduated in the spring of 1928. The original school was constructed off of present day Swansboro-Belgrade Road (Maysville, NC). The school was renamed "Tabernacle" at the end of the 1969–70 school year as the "new" White Oak High School was constructed on Piney Green Road (the present day location). Until the spring of 1970, the mascot for White Oak was the Red Devil and the colors were red and white. When the school moved to Piney Green Road, a rising class of students selected the Viking as the new mascot and green and gold as the new colors.

=== Yearbooks ===
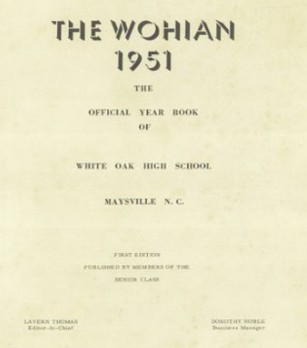
1951 School Yearbook

From 1927 to 1950, the school was without an official annual or yearbook. During the 1950–51 school year, under the leadership of teacher Mrs. Clyde Morton Ward, the first yearbook was published. The first edition was called "The WOHIAN".

The White Oak annual was named "The WOHian" from 1950 to 1956, the "Wee Toc" from 1957 to 1969 and the "Viking Log" from 1970 to the present day.

=== Principals ===
White Oak High School has had 17 principals since opening in 1927. The Red Devil and Viking leaders are:

- 1928–193? A. H. Hatsell
- 193?–1939 L. B. Farnell
- 1939–1941 H. A. Melvin
- 1941–1942 E. N. Farnell
- 1942–1943 D. G. Shaw
- 1943–1945 O. C. Burton
- 1945–1947 B. F. Patrick
- 1947–1953 C. M. Ward
- 1953–1956 Howard E. Aman
- 1956–1968 Allen H. Stafford (after WO, he opened Morton Elementary School)
- 1968–1970 Rudolph Whaley (after WO, he remained at the same building, renamed Tabernacle; he later opened Hunters' Creek Middle)
- 1970–1988 Amos Stroud (after WO, he opened Tabernacle 5th Grade Center in 1989 served as its principal for one year and retired in 1990.)
- 1988–2007 Paul Wiggins (after WO, he retired and became an elected BOE member until 2020 )
- 2007–2008 Megan Doyle (after WO, she became a Superintendent of Craven County Schools)
- 2008–2011 Debra Bryan (after WO, she retired and became an instructional coach)
- 2011–2016 Jane Dennis (after WO, she became the principal of New Bridge Middle School)
- 2016–2021 Christopher Barnes (became Executive Director in Instructional Services at Central Office)
- 2021–present Joycelyn Cassidy

== Current motto ==
'We All Row!' White Oak High School utilizes a motto based on the image of the Viking ship. The image is prominently featured on the wall of the front hall of the school.

== Athletics ==
The White Oak Vikings compete in the following sports: Volleyball, Cross Country, Track, Wrestling, Football, Basketball, Swimming, Golf, Tennis, Track, Softball & Baseball.

== Testing summary ==
As of the most recent testing profile (2017), White Oak High School is ranked 47th out of 2531 schools in NC in terms of the EVAAS growth index (measuring schools for based on the amount of academic growth from one year to the next). This puts WOHS in the top 2% of schools as measured by academic growth.

== Notable alumni ==
- Chad Fonville, MLB infielder and outfielder from 1995–1999
- Christina Koch, NASA Astronaut, 2026 Artemis II mission, first woman to fly near the Moon
- Louie Meadows, MLB left fielder from 1986–1990
- Quincy Monk, NFL linebacker for the New York Giants and Houston Texans
- Andre Purvis, NFL defensive tackle for the Cincinnati Bengals
- Tarvis Williams, professional basketball player
