= Franklin High School (North Carolina) =

American public school in North Carolina

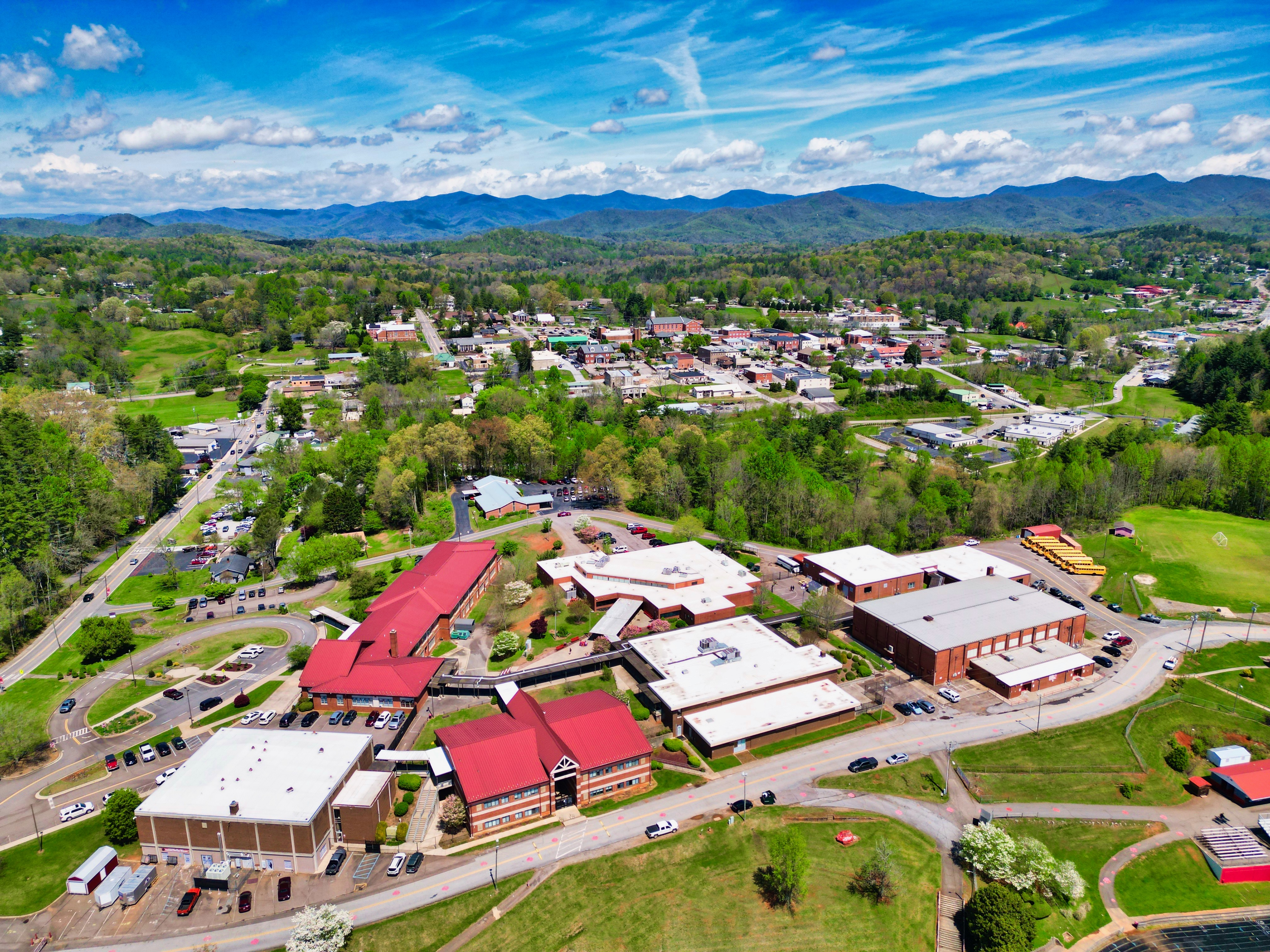

Location
- 100 Panther Dr; Franklin, North Carolina 28734; United States
- 35°10′35″N 83°22′50″W

Information
- Type: Public
- School district: Macon County Schools
- CEEB code: 341370
- Principal: Blair King
- Faculty: 87
- Teaching staff: 59.72 (FTE)
- Grades: 9–12
- Enrollment: 1,036 (2023–2024)
- Student to teacher ratio: 17.35
- Colors: Red, White (Alt Color Grey)
- Mascot: Panther
- Website: fhs.macon.k12.nc.us/o/fhs

Franklin High School is the largest 9th-12th grade public high school in Macon County, North Carolina. Franklin High is just parallel to downtown Franklin. It is part of the Macon County School System. The graduation rate is about 98 percent as of 2023.

== Athletics ==
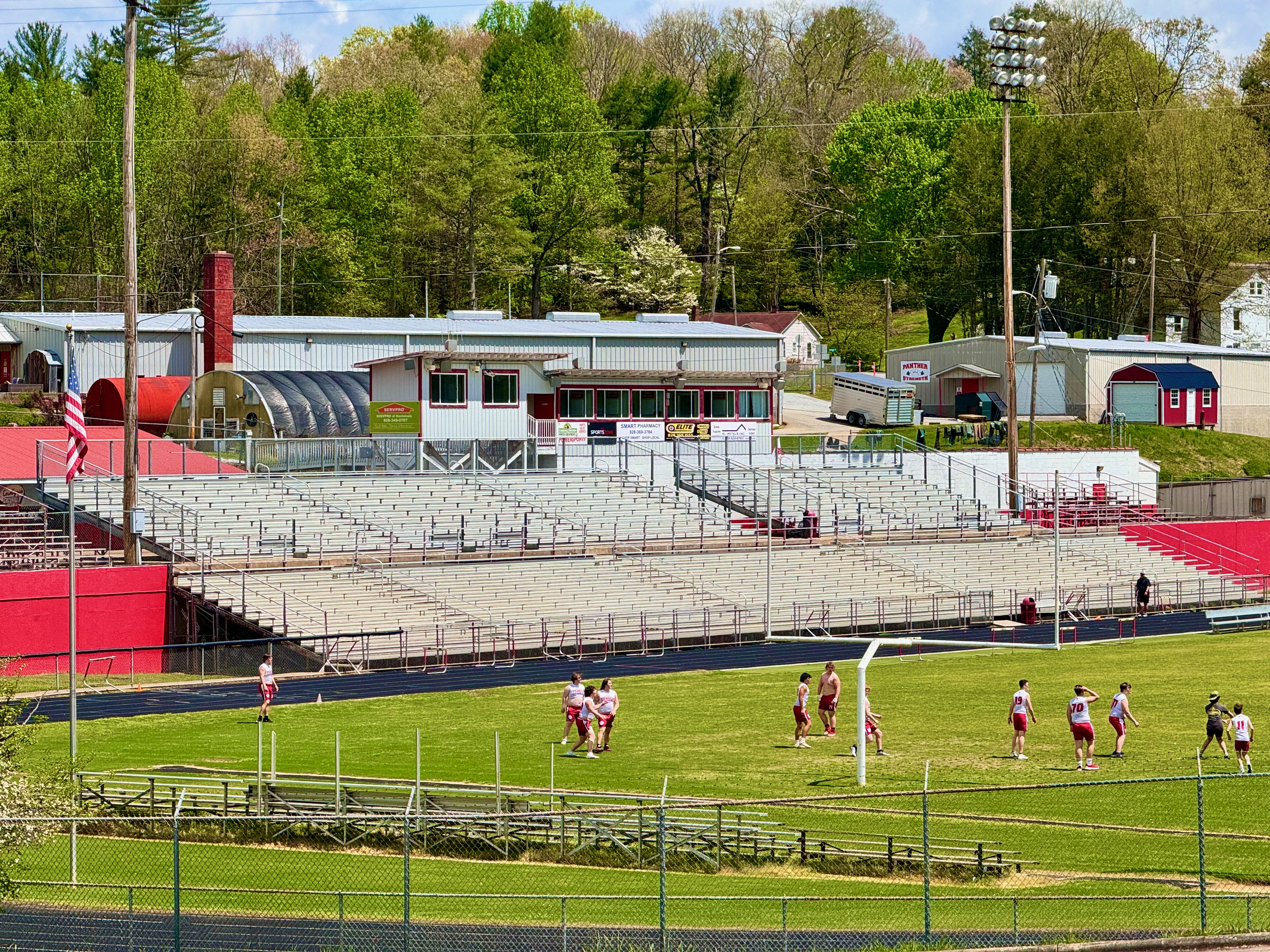
The Panther football stadium

Franklin's teams are known as the Panthers. Franklin competes in the Mountain Seven Conference and its varsity sports are:

- Baseball
- Basketball
- Cross Country
- Field Hockey
- Football
- Golf
- Lacrosse
- Soccer
- Softball
- Swimming
- Tennis
- Track & Field
- Volleyball
- Wrestling

== History ==
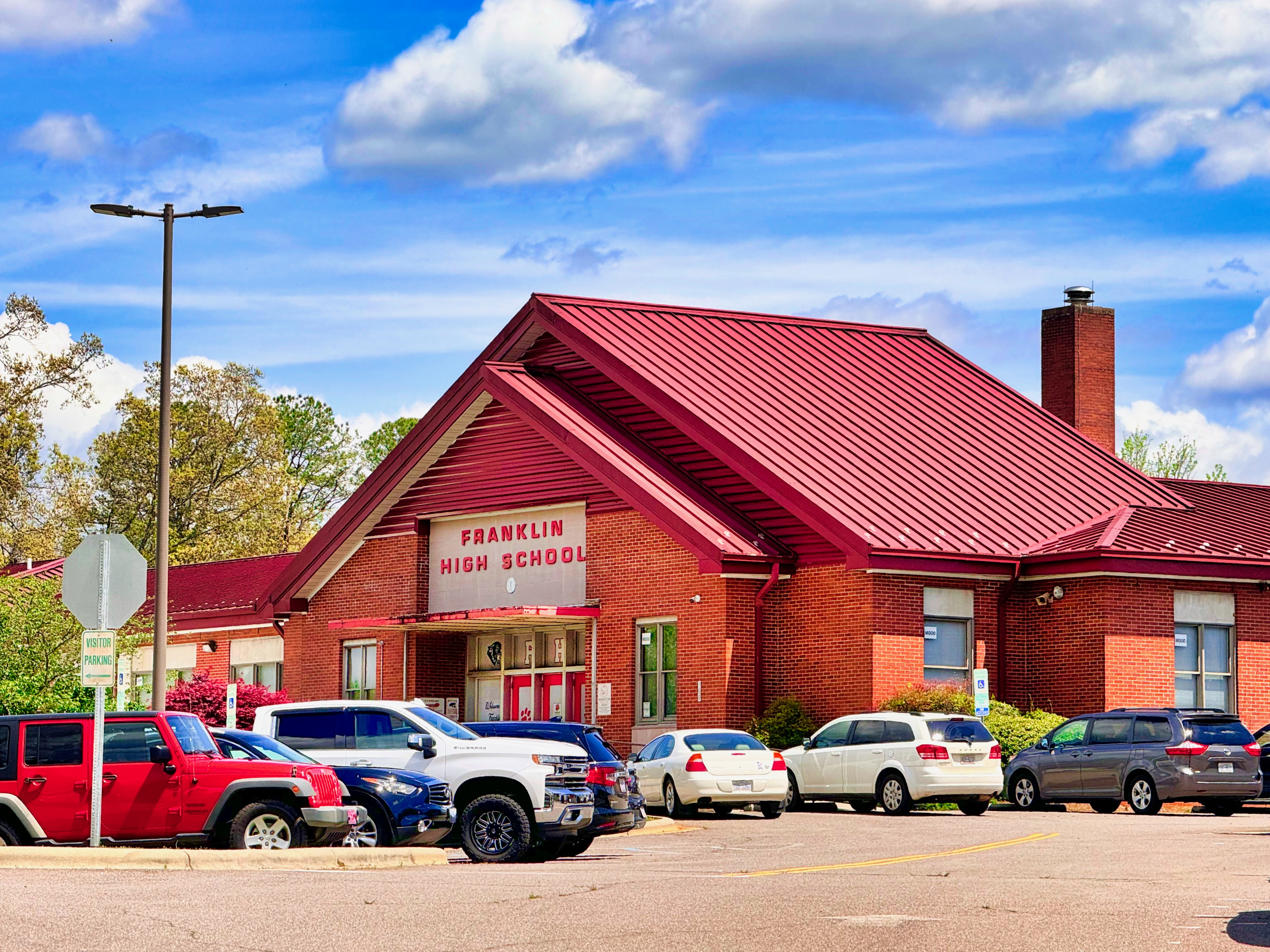
Franklin High School was built in 1952

A 15-room high school and cafeteria was built in Franklin in 1952. A seven-room annex was constructed on the north end of the building in 1955. When the gymnasium burned in 1954, a new $157,000 gym was built to replace it.

In 2022, plans were announced to demolish the existing campus and construct a modern 265,000-square-foot three-story school on the same land. The new complex would support up to 1,400 students. The estimated cost for the project is approximately $110 million.

== Notable alumni ==
- Cory Asbury (2004), Christian musician, worship pastor, and songwriter
- Shawn Bryson (1995), former NFL running back
- Robert C. Carpenter (1942), member of the North Carolina Senate
- Blake Harrell (1998), head football coach at East Carolina University
