= Stanly County Schools =

Local education agency in North Carolina, US

Location
- 1000-4 North First Street; Albemarle, North Carolina 28001 Albemarle, North Carolina and Stanly County, North Carolina, North Carolina
- Coordinates: 35.3662°N 80.1980°W

District information
- Superintendent: Dr. Jarrod Dennis
- Accreditation: Southern Association of Colleges and Schools
- Schools: 21
- Budget: ?

Students and staff
- Students: 8,700
- Teachers: 500+

Other information
- Website: www.stanlycountyschools.org

Stanly County Schools (abbreviated SCS) is a local education agency headquartered in Albemarle, North Carolina and is the public school system for Stanly County. With over 1,350 employees, Stanly County Schools is the largest employer in Stanly County, North Carolina serving more than 8,700 students in grades PK – 12.

== Governance ==
The Stanly County Schools Board of Education, or school board, consists of 7 members—2 at-large and 5 from districts. Members serve staggered four-year terms; the at-large members are elected in the year before presidential elections and the district members are elected in the year after presidential elections.

== Schools ==
=== High schools ===
- Albemarle High School "Bulldogs"
- North Stanly High School "Comets"
- South Stanly High School "Rebel Bulls"
- Stanly Academy Learning Center "Eagles"
- Stanly Early College "Tigers"
- West Stanly High School "Colts"

=== Middle schools ===
- Albemarle Middle School "Bulldogs
- North Stanly Middle School "Comets"
- South Stanly Middle School "Rebels"
- West Stanly Middle School "Colts"

=== Elementary schools ===
- Aquadale Elementary "Little Bulls"
- Badin Elementary "Watts"
- Central Elementary "Bulldogs"
- East Albemarle Elementary "Bullpups"
- Endy Elementary"Redskins"
- Locust Elementary "Colts
- Millingport Elementary "Wildcats"
- Norwood Elementary "Patriots"
- Oakboro Choice STEM Elementary School "Eagles"
- Richfield Elementary "Tigers"
- Stanfield Elementary "Wildcats"
