= Charlotte Secondary School =

American public charter school in North Carolina

Coordinates: 35°9′20″N 80°45′3″W

Charlotte Secondary School is a public charter school located in Charlotte, North Carolina. It opened in 2007 as a middle school, and has since grown to include grades 6–12.

== History ==
Charlotte Secondary School is a public charter school that opened with middle school grades in 2007. After being recognized as a School of Distinction, the school began expanding with high school grades in 2013, by adding the 9th and 10th grade levels during its 2014–15 school year, then the 11th and 12th in the following two years consecutively. The school's first class of seniors graduated in 2016.

In its first four years of operation, the school offered Encore classes that all students took (music, visual arts, physical education and paideia arts). Because of the small size of the school, the Encore classes changed based on student and instructional needs. In the 2011–12 school year, students were able to choose from a variety of arts and social sciences electives, including digital photography, fine arts, media and journalism, and humanities and debate, with Spanish classes being another elective offering. In fall of 2014, students were offered technology, art, PE/health, and civics elective classes.

In 2018, Charlotte Secondary School’s lacrosse team was featured in an ESPN documentary, which detailed the team’s struggles throughout the year, as well as the academic struggles of the players, and what the team’s coach did to help them.

== Curriculum ==
Charlotte Secondary's middle school curriculum consists mainly of four core classes—Math, science, language arts, and social studies—that last the whole school year, with two elective classes per semester, each elective being taken every other day.

However, the high school grades have more flexibility in schedules, with alternating classes every semester, a list of elective classes to choose from, and a varying number of core classes and electives per student. Also, the high school has only four periods, in contrast to the middle school's five.
