= Midwood High School (North Carolina) =

American public school in North Carolina

Location
- 1411 Hawthorne Ln; Charlotte, North Carolina 28205; United States
- Coordinates: 35°13′15″N 80°48′32″W

Information
- Type: Public
- Motto: Destination Excellence
- Established: 2007 (19 years ago)
- Principal: Diann Weston
- Colors: Orange and blue
- Mascot: Knights (former)
- Website: schools.cms.k12.nc.us/midwoodHS/Pages/Default.aspx

Midwood High School is a non-traditional high school in its namesake neighborhood of Charlotte, North Carolina. The school acts as a transition program for ninth graders who struggled to meet benchmarks in eighth grade into a high school environment.

== About ==
Midwood has a dotted history. It has always been one of Charlotte's smaller high schools, mostly due to its small, aging physical plant. It has been used as a traditional school, a management school, a teenage parents academy, closed, and now as a transition school. The goal of the school is to prevent socially promoted ninth graders from dropping out. Students are zoned to one of the four "achievement zone" schools (Garinger, Waddell, West Charlotte, or West Meck).

== Athletics ==
Midwood doesn't field interscholastic athletic teams. However, Midwood students who meet academic goals are eligible to play for the school they are zoned to. Midwood's athletic teams were called the Knights.
