= Rutherford County Schools (North Carolina) =

School district in North Carolina, United States

Coordinates: 35.4258737°N 81.909826°W

Rutherford County Schools is a school district based in Forest City, North Carolina, United States.

Dr. David Sutton has been the superintendent since the 2019-2020 school year

They currently have an enrollment of approximately 9,500 students.

The district operates the following schools:

High Schools:

- Chase High School
- East Rutherford High School
- R-S Central High School
- REaCH (Rutherford Early College High School)
- Rutherford Opportunity Center

Middle Schools:

- Chase Middle School
- East Rutherford Middle School
- R-S Middle School

Elementary Schools:

- Cliffside Elementary School
- Ellenboro Elementary School
- Forest City-Dunbar Elementary School
- Forrest W. Hunt Elementary School
- Harris Elementary School
- Mount Vernon-Ruth Elementary School
- Pinnacle Elementary School
- Rutherfordton Elementary School
- Spindale Elementary School
- Sunshine Elementary School

The Rutherford County Schools Education Foundation was established in 2009 for the purpose of enriching the education of Rutherford County Schools' students, teachers, and the community. Specifically, the Rutherford County Schools Education Foundation is committed to providing laptop computers for every Rutherford County Schools student in grades 6-12.
