= Warren County Schools =

School district in North Carolina, United States

Warren County Public Schools, or Warren County Schools is a school district headquartered in Warrenton, North Carolina.

Dr. Ray Spain served as superintendent from circa 2003 until 2019, when he retired. In July 2019 Dr. Mary Young became the superintendent with all members of the school board voting for her. She resigned in March 2021. In May Keith Sutton became the interim superintendent.

== Schools ==
High schools

- Warren County High School
- Warren Early College High School
- Warren New Tech High School

K-8 school

- Northside K-8 School

Middle schools

- Warren County Middle School

Elementary school

- Mariam Boyd Elementary School
- Vaughan Elementary School
