= Guilford County Schools =

School district in Guilford County, North Carolina, U.S.

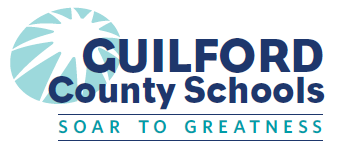

Location
- Guilford County, North Carolina

District information
- Motto: Striving. Achieving. Excelling.
- Superintendent: Whitney Oakley
- Schools: 67 elementary; 22 middle schools; 26 high schools; 7 alternative

Students and staff
- Students: 72,196
- Faculty: 10,394 (9524 full-time)

Other information
- Website: gcsnc.com

Guilford County Schools is a school district in the state of North Carolina. The state's third largest district, it serves Greensboro and High Point.

== Schools ==
=== Elementary schools ===
- Alamance Elementary
- Alderman Elementary
- Allen Jay Elementary
- Bessemer Elementary
- Bluford Elementary
- Brightwood Elementary
- Brooks Global Studies
- Claxton Elementary
- Colfax Elementary
- Cone Elementary
- Erwin Elementary
- Fairview Elementary
- Falkener Elementary
- Florence Elementary
- Foust Elementary
- Frasier Elementary
- General Greene Elementary
- Gibsonville Elementary
- Gillespie Park Elementary
- Guilford Elementary
- Hunter Elementary
- Irving Park Elementary
- Jamestown Elementary
- Jefferson Elementary
- Jesse Wharton Elementary
- Johnson Street Global Studies
- Jones Elementary
- Joyner Elementary
- Kirkman Park Elementary
- Lindley Elementary
- Madison Elementary
- Mcleansville Elementary
- McNair Elementary
- Millis Road Elementary
- Monticello-Brown Summit Elementary
- Montlieu Elementary Academy of Technology
- Morehead Elementary
- Nathanael Greene Elementary
- Northern Elementary
- Northwood Elementary
- Oak Hill Elementary
- Oak Ridge Elementary
- Oak View Elementary
- Parkview Village Elementary
- Pearce Elementary
- Peck Elementary
- Peeler-Hampton Elementary
- Pilot Elementary
- Pleasant Garden Elementary
- Rankin Elementary
- Reedy Fork Elementary
- Sedalia Elementary
- Sedgefield Elementary
- Shadybrook Elementary
- Simkins Elementary
- Southern Elementary
- Southwest Elementary
- Sternberger Elementary
- Stokesdale Elementary
- Summerfield Elementary
- Sumner Elementary
- Triangle Lake Montessori Elementary
- Union Hill Elementary
- Vandalia Elementary
- Washington Elementary

=== Middle schools ===
- Allen Middle
- Allen Jay preparatory academy
- Brown Summit Middle
- Eastern Guilford Middle
- Ferndale Middle
- Guilford Middle
- Hairston Middle
- Jackson Middle
- Jamestown Middle
- Johnson Street Global Studies
- Kernodle Middle
- Kiser Middle
- Academy at Lincoln
- Mendenhall Middle
- Northeast Guilford Middle
- Northern Guilford Middle
- Northwest Guilford Middle
- Penn-Griffin School for the Arts
- Southeast Guilford Middle
- Southern Guilford Middle
- Southwest Guilford Middle
- Welborn Academy of Science and Technology

=== High schools ===
- Academy at Smith
- Ben L. Smith High School
- The Early College at Guilford
- Eastern Guilford High School
- Greensboro College Middle College
- Grimsley Senior High School
- High Point Central High School
- James B. Dudley High School
- Kearns Academy
- Middle College at GTCC - Greensboro
- Middle College at GTCC - High Point
- Middle College at GTCC - Jamestown
- The Middle College at UNCG
- Middle College at NC A&T
- Northeast Guilford High School
- Northern Guilford High School
- Northwest Guilford High School
- Lucy Ragsdale High School
- Penn-Griffin School for the Arts
- Piedmont Classical High School (Charter)
- Southeast Guilford High School
- Southern Guilford High School
- Southwest Guilford High School
- T. Wingate Andrews High School
- Walter Hines Page Senior High School
- Weaver Academy
- Western Guilford High School
- The STEM Early College at NCAT
