= Rowan-Salisbury School System =

School district in North Carolina, U.S.

Location
- Rowan County, NC North Carolina Piedmont United States

District information
- Type: Public
- Motto: Extraordinary Education Every Day
- Grades: PK–12
- Established: 1989
- Superintendent: Dr. [Kelly W. Withers]
- Asst. superintendent(s): Dr. Jamie Durant
- Accreditation: AdvancED
- Schools: 35
- Budget: $190,480,000
- NCES District ID: 3704050

Students and staff
- Students: 20,000
- Teachers: 1,400.69 (on FTE basis)
- Staff: 1,345.21 (on FTE basis)
- Student–teacher ratio: 14.61:1

Other information
- Website: www.rssed.org

The Rowan-Salisbury School System (also called Rowan-Salisbury Schools or for short RSS) is a PK–12 graded school district in North Carolina covering nearly all of Rowan County including the city of Salisbury. The second largest employer in the county, the system's 35 schools serve 20,000 students as of 2013–2014. Salisbury split off from the original county-wide system in 1921, but merged back into the county system in 1989.

Josh Wagner chairs the seven-member Board of Education while Dr. Tony Watlington serves as the sixth superintendent of the combined system. The system has won several awards, including two statewide Teachers of the Year and two Blue Ribbon schools.

== History ==
The history of public education in Rowan County began shortly after the state passed its first common school law in 1839. The state was then divided into several school districts. District number 22 (called the Setzer School District) covered Rowan County and was based in the Setzer School, a one-room log school built in 1840s just east of China Grove.

The first public schools in Rowan were established in 1847. Several citizens interested in education met and formed the Board of Superintendents of Common Schools of Rowan County on May 8, 1847. They elected Hamilton C. Jones as their first chairman. That year, they worked to hire teachers, choose/elect superintendents and divide the county into 47 school districts.

=== Rowan County public schools ===
Educational progress happened more rapidly in the city of Salisbury than in the rest of the county. While Salisbury's schools grew, schools in the rest of Rowan County lagged far behind. After the city school system split off, the difference became more noticeable as a report from John H. Cook from the North Carolina College for Women (now, University of North Carolina at Greensboro) around 1924 called the county's schools the worst in North Carolina. At the time, the county only had 36 schools many of which were only one or two room buildings. Cook devised a plan for school improvement and new school construction which the county commissioners and the citizens promptly adopted in 1924. Soon thereafter, a school construction boom created 18 schools with at least eight rooms each.

Racial desegregation became a tough issue for many in the Rowan County Schools system. The separate Black schools were phased out, but many opposed to racial integration still put up a fight. This was aggravated by a strong Klan presence in the area. Notable incidents included 12 people arrested in 1967, including Rowan County's Registrar of Deeds, for threats, shootings, and bombings; as well as student protests over the playing of the song "Dixie" at school football games at integrated South Rowan High School. .

=== Salisbury city schools ===
When the Board of Superintendents set up the county school districts, the town of Salisbury fell into district 27. In 1847, monies apportioned to operate the school in the district totaled $221. The first teachers of the district were Susan Giles and Eleanor Fulton. This Salisbury Graded School District was centered on the school and offices on Ellis Street. Later the area would become known as the Ellis Street Graded School District. The Salisbury Graded School had grown much from its origins and the city built a high school separate from the other grades in 1904. This was the second high school built in North Carolina after Wilmington.

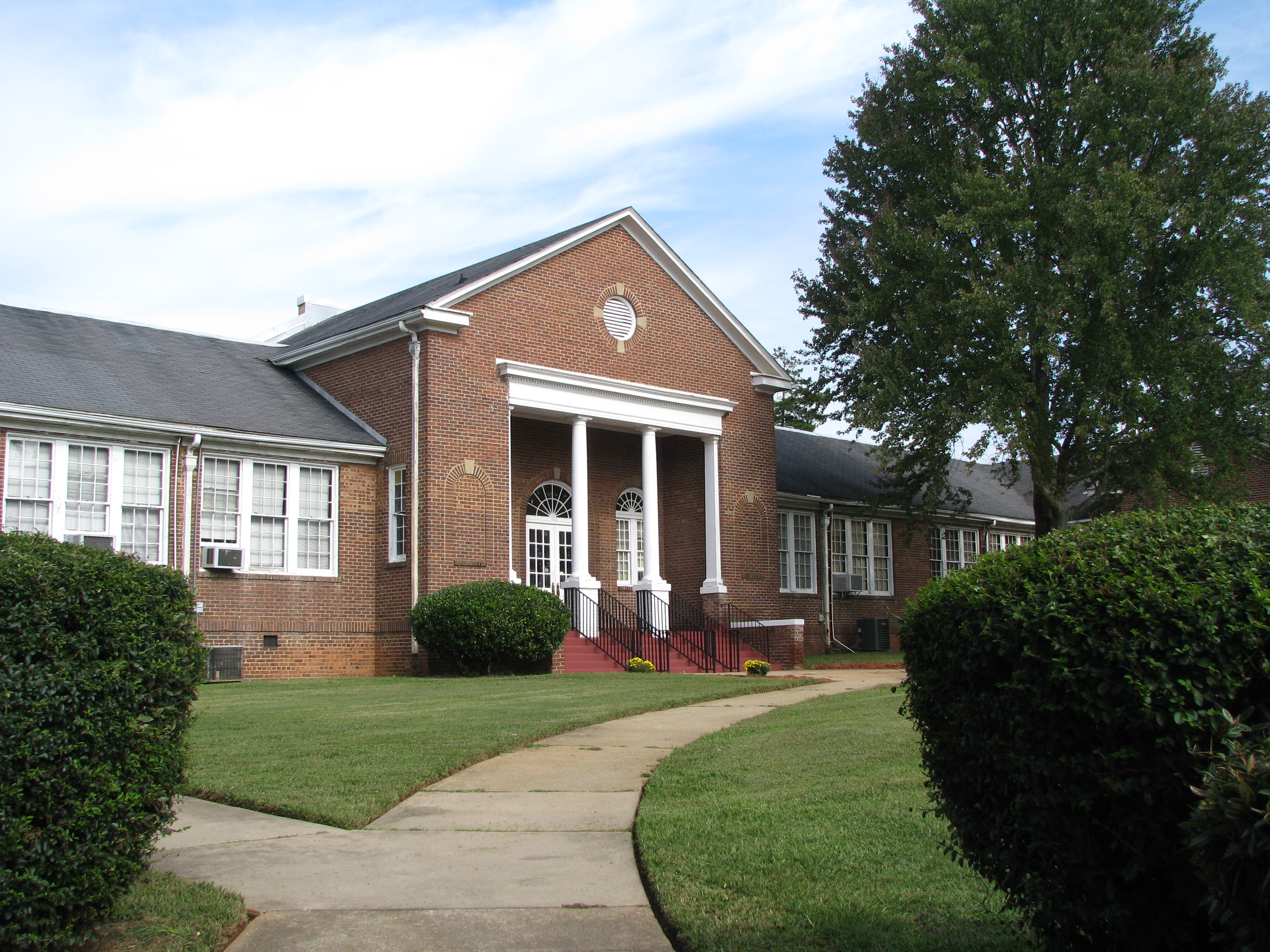
The former J. C. Price High School

Prior to the establishment of Salisbury City Schools, the school district fell under control of the county school system. The district was managed jointly by the City of Salisbury and the district's board of trustees. Salisbury City Schools brgan as a separate system on March 3, 1921, when the North Carolina General Assembly adopted the law that allowed a separate Board of Education to run the system.

Several schools were built over next few years, including the Wiley School, Boyden High School and Price High School. The Calvin H. Wiley School, built 1916–18, was expanded in 1921. It was used as a school building until 1983 and is now on the National Register of Historic Places (NRHP). Another prominent school built in 1926, was Boyden High School, named for Archibald Henderson Boyden, an educator who was then Mayor of Salisbury. J.C. Price High School was an African American school that served students in the system from 1932 until 1969 when it was integrated into Boyden High School, which then became Salisbury High School in 1970. The Boyden High School site and the Price High School site are also on the NRHP.

=== Merger ===
The current Rowan-Salisbury School System was formed in 1989 by the merger of Rowan County Schools and Salisbury City Schools. The process leading up to the merger was difficult and almost not approved several times. Declining enrollment in the city and county systems (especially the city system) and a general move towards "white flight" from the more urban and minority-heavy city schools had prompted discussions of merging the systems. At issue in the merger talks primarily was redistricting and racial balance in the schools. However, the separate city and county school boards approved a merger plan on October 16, 1987. This was soon approved by the Rowan County Commission and the State Board of Education. Adding to the stresses of the merger process, a red measles outbreak in 1989 limited school activities and athletics in Rowan and Cabarrus counties for several weeks. Since the merger, the system has become the second-largest employer in Rowan County.

In 2006, the school board made headlines when students at South Rowan High School started up a gay–straight alliance club at their school. In response to public complaint, led by Flip Benham of Operation Save America from neighboring Cabarrus county, the Board of Education adopted a policy banning "sex-based student clubs" at all schools in the system. The combined system handled around 16,000 students in 1990.

Even decades after the merger consolidated the systems, the school district had no central office, instead spreading administrative tasks over five office locations across Rowan County. The move towards a central office for the system has been contentious in the county. Disagreements between the county commission and the school board delayed finalizing plans and construction. The Salisbury City Council even agreed to help fund construction of a central office.

The Wallace Education Forum officially opened March 14, 2016 in the 500 block of North Main Street, on land from Leo and Mona Wallace.

== Student demographics ==
For the 2010–2011 school year, Rowan-Salisbury Schools had a population of 20,460 students and 1,400.69 teachers on a (FTE) basis. This created a student-teacher ratio of 14.61:1. The same year, out of the total student population, the gender ratio was 51% male to 49% female. The demographic group makeup was: White, 65%; Black, 19%; Hispanic, 12%; Asian/Pacific Islander, 1%; and American Indian, 0% (two or more races, 2%). For the same school year, 60.51% of the students received free and reduced-cost lunches.

In 2012, nearly 70% of Rowan-Salisbury School System elementary students receive free or reduced lunches, according to Amy Goodnight, executive director of Food for Thought.

== Governance and funding ==
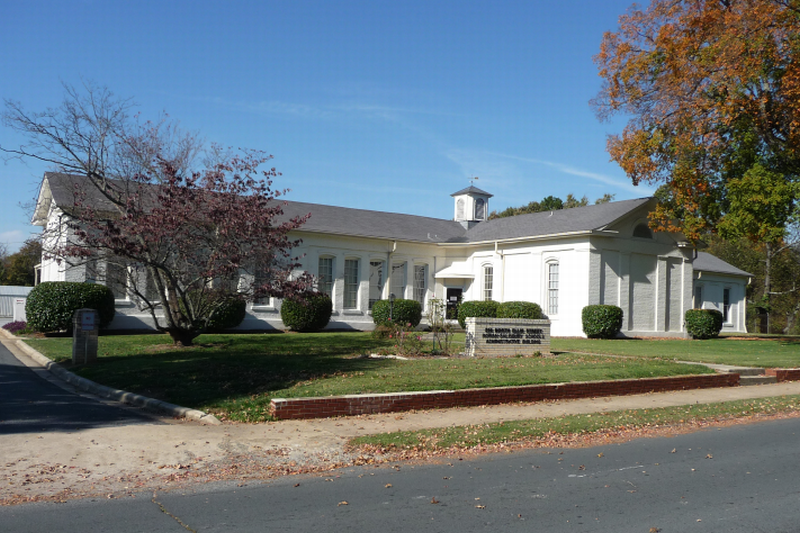
Ellis St. Administrative Building in Salisbury, NC.

The primary governing body of the Rowan-Salisbury School System follows a council–manager government format with a seven-member Board of Education appointing a Superintendent to run the day-to-day operations of the system. The system resides in the North Carolina State Board of Education's Seventh District.

=== Board of education ===
The seven-member Rowan-Salisbury Board of Education generally meets on the fourth Monday of each month. The members are chosen in non-partisan elections by the whole county, but must come from one of the six high school districts or the special area district. The board serves four-year, staggered terms with elections every two years. Its current members are: Josh Wagner (chairperson), East area; Dean Hunter (Vice-chairperson), South area; Chuck Hughes, Salisbury area; Travis Allen, West area; Susan Cox, Southeast area; W. Jean Kennedy, Special area; and Richard Miller, North area.

In response to HB2, the Rowan-Salisbury Board of Education ruled on May 10, 2016, that students can carry pepper spray and mace. Board member Chuck Hughes said, "Depending on how the courts rule on the bathroom issues, it may be a pretty valuable tool to have on the female students if they go to the bathroom, not knowing who may come in."

=== Superintendent ===
The district has had six superintendents since the merger. Don Martin was chosen from outside the county to lead the newly merged school district. He served from 1989 until leaving in 1994 to lead the Winston-Salem/Forsyth County Schools. Joe McCann, who had previously worked for the county school system before the merger was chosen as the next superintendent, serving from 1995 until 2000. Then, Wiley Doby served as the district leader 2001–2006.

Dr. Judy Grissom was chosen to replace Wiley Doby as superintendent when his contract expired on April 1, 2006. A native of Rowan County, Grissom once worked for the school system and had been associate superintendent for the Alamance-Burlington School System. In 2011, Grissom won Superintendent of the Year for the southwest region and was a finalist for the statewide award. Grissom provided the school district which the leadership that was responsible for the school district winning more state and national awards, especially in the areas of technology and curriculum innovation. Her tenure as Superintendent resulted in more national and state achieve awards than any of the district's superintendents.

Dr. Lynn Moody was the fifth superintendent of the district. She also had been superintendent of Rock Hill Schools system. Moody was chosen to replace Judy Grissom as superintendent starting in October, 2013. As Rowan-Salisbury's Superintendent, Moody leads the district of approximately 20,000 students and 3,000 employees in 35 schools and five central office locations. The focus for 2014–2017, as defined in the district's Strategic Plan, is Literacy and Student Engagement through problem-based learning, digital conversion and professional learning communities. Classrooms are transforming to increase rigor and engagement through CCRP: Connected-Learning, Collaboration, Relevancy, and Personalization. During the 2014–15 school year, Rowan-Salisbury was moved to a one-to-one digital conversion. Teachers and high school students received MacBook Air laptops, while students in grades 3-8 received iPads. This teaching and learning tool has changed the culture of the community and its schools.

In 2021, Dr. Lynn Moody retired from her work of seven years being an superintendent.

The superintendent leading the Rowan-Salisbury School System is now Dr. Kelly W. Withers., replacing Dr. Lynn Moody

=== Funding ===
Public school districts in North Carolina do not have their own taxation authority; they are fiscally dependent on the State and their respective county Board of Commissioners. The county Boards of Commissioners vote on funding levels proposed by the school system.

Prior to the merger of the city and county systems, spending per-pupil differed greatly between the city and county schools. The City of Salisbury supplemented the spending more than the County of Rowan did. Spending per-pupil equalized to be greater than what the Rowan County Public Schools public schools spent previously, but a report in 2005 showed that spending to be consistently below the state average.

The Blanche & Julian Robertson Family Foundation has awarded several grants Rowan-Salisbury Schools.

== Member schools ==
The Rowan-Salisbury School System has 35 schools ranging from pre-kindergarten to twelfth grade, including an early college high school. Those 35 schools are separated into 8 high schools, 7 middle schools and 20 elementary schools. The system's high schools often hold their graduation ceremonies at Catawba College's Keppel Auditorium.

=== High schools ===
- East Rowan High School (Mustangs) – Granite Quarry
- Henderson Independent High School (Eagles) – Salisbury
- Jesse C. Carson High School (Cougars) – China Grove
- North Rowan High School (Cavaliers) – Spencer
- Rowan County Early College (Timberwolves) – Salisbury
- Salisbury High School (Hornets) – Salisbury
- South Rowan High School (Raiders) – China Grove
- West Rowan High School (Falcons) – Mount Ulla

=== Middle schools ===
There are seven middle schools in the system. Knox Middle School has been chosen to become the district's first STEM middle school.

- China Grove Middle School (Red Devils) – China Grove
- Corriher-Lipe Middle School (Yellow Jackets) – Landis
- Erwin Middle School (Eagles) – Granite Quarry
- North Rowan Middle School (Mavericks) – Spencer
- Southeast Middle School (Patriots) – Salisbury
- West Rowan Middle School (Bulldogs) – Salisbury

=== Intermediate ===
- J.H. Knox Intermediate School (Grade 3-8)

=== Elementary schools ===
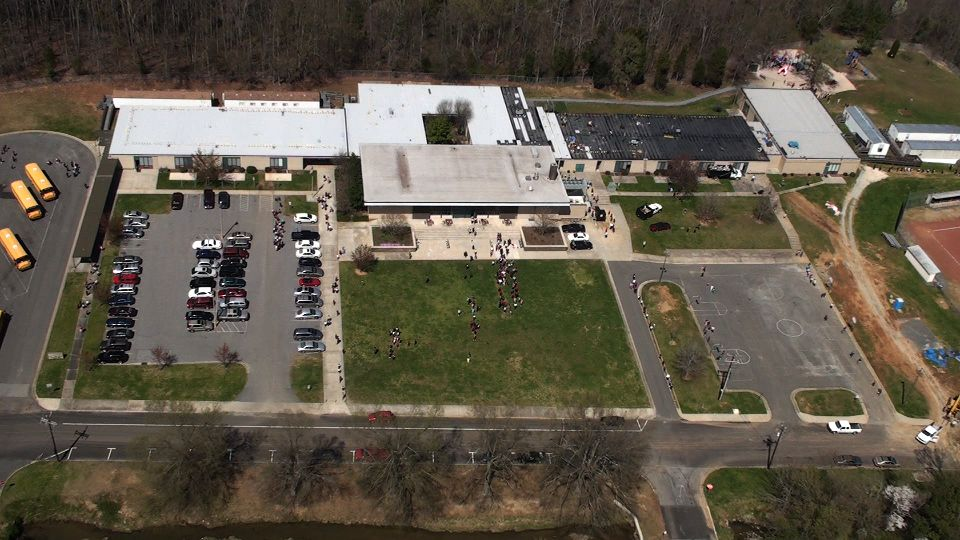
Overton Elementary School

- Bostian Elementary School (Bulldogs) – China Grove
- China Grove Elementary School (Cardinals) – China Grove
- Granite Quarry Elementary School (Dragons) – Granite Quarry
- Hanford-Dole Elementary School (Bobcats) – Salisbury
- Hurley Elementary School (All Stars) – Salisbury
- Isenberg Elementary School (Investigators) – Salisbury
- Knollwood Elementary School (Knights) – Salisbury
- Koontz Elementary School (Panthers) – Salisbury
- Landis Elementary School (Mini Jackets) – Landis
- Millbridge Elementary School (Musketeers) – China Grove
- Morgan Elementary School (Broncos) – Gold Hill
- Mount Ulla Elementary School (Bears) – Mount Ulla
- North Rowan Elementary School (Steamers) – Spencer
- Overton Elementary School (Explorers) – Salisbury
- Rockwell Elementary School (Roadrunners) – Rockwell
- Shive Elementary School (Stingers) – Rockwell
- West Rowan Elementary School (Wildcats) - Cleveland

=== Horizons Unlimited ===
The school system also manages Horizons Unlimited, a facility behind Knox Middle School that includes the 1842 Setzer School building, a 32-acre wetland preserve, a planetarium, several aquaria, a rainforest habitat, and several Native American artifacts. It oversees the largest WILD Environmental Education Site in North Carolina with a 600-acre research area. The structure itself houses nearly 20,000 square feet of classroom and exhibit space. Horizons hosts the North Carolina Region 6A Science and Engineering Fair and is a member of the Coalition on the Public Understanding of Science (COPUS).

== Athletics ==
Athletic departments for the district schools are members of the North Carolina High School Athletic Association. They compete in various sports over three different conferences. North Rowan is a 1A school in the Yadkin Valley Conference. Salisbury High is a 2A school in the Central Carolina Conference. Carson, East, South, and West Rowan are all 3A schools in the South Piedmont Conference. Rowan County Early College and Henderson Independent do not have athletic teams. Prior to 2008, North Rowan was a 2A school in the Central Carolina Conference, but when enrollment at the school decreased, the NCHSAA dropped the school to 1A status and moved them to another conference.

In baseball, Salisbury High won one 3A state championship in 1955. East Rowan won two 3A state titles in 1995 and 2010. Football has seen more successes with Salisbury winning 3A state titles in 1955 and 1957 as well as a 2-AA title in 2010. West Rowan won three straight 3A state championships from 2008 to 2010, which included two straight undefeated seasons with a 46-game winning streak. J. C. Price High School won the Black schools athletic association (the North Carolina High School Athletic Conference) state AA championship in 1952.

== Achievements and awards ==
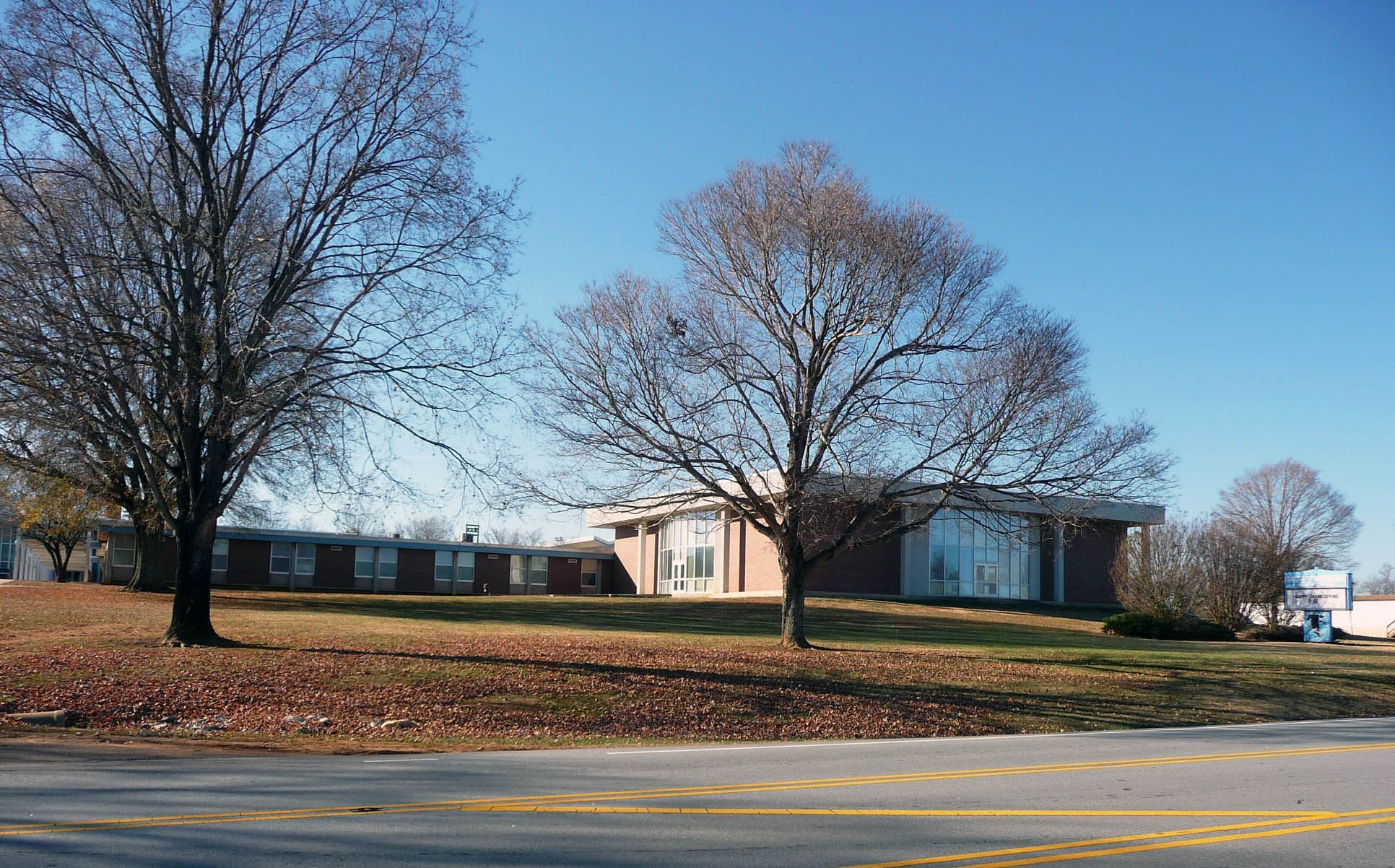
West Rowan High School

The Rowan-Salisbury School System has had two schools listed as Blue Ribbon Schools: West Rowan High School (1990–91) and China Grove Elementary School (1989–90).

Under the direction of former superintendent Dr. Judy Grissom and executive director of Technology, Phil Hardin, the system was ranked sixth nationally in 2013 in the Large Student Population District category of the Center for Digital Education's Digital School Districts Survey. The ranking showed the district's "use of technology to govern the district, communicate with students, parents and the community and to improve district operations". The school district was ranked ninth nationally in 2012 in the Large Student Population District category of the Center for Digital Education's Digital School Districts Survey. In 2012, the 1:1 mobile device program that was instituted at North Rowan High School by Superintendent, Dr. Judy Grissom, and executive director of Technology, Phil Hardin was recognized with the North Carolina School Board Association's overall grand prize in the Award of Excellence In Educational Programs. This 1:1 program provided North Rowan High School students 24/7 access to mobile devices and was one of the first 1:1 high programs in the state of North Carolina. The program also provided wireless access for students on their buses.

In 2013, the International Society for Technology in Education, ISTE, presented the Superintendent, Dr. Judy Grissom and executive director of Technology, Phil Hardin, with the Sylvia Charp Award for Innovation in District Technology. In 2012, executive director of Technology, Phil Hardin, was awarded 2012 Outstanding Leader Award through the North Carolina Technology In Education Society and Superintendent, Dr. Judy Grissom, was presented the "2012 Making IT (Instructional Technology) Happen Award. Two employees of the school district have won the North Carolina School Psychology Association Practitioner of the Year Award: Ann Hammonds Long in 1993 and Shirley Bowles in 2000. Rowan-Salisbury School System has had two teachers recognized as a North Carolina Department of Public Instruction Teacher of the Year: Cynthia B. Zeger-Ostherhus from Salisbury City Schools for 1987–88 and Sandra Davis Rogers from Rowan County Schools for 1989–90. None have won since the merger. In 2005, the system's technology director, Phil Hardin received the North Carolina Technology Educator Award in the administrator category from the state Department of Public Instruction. Also, Theresa Pierce, from Horizons Unlimited, was named the North Carolina Gilder Lehrman Institute of American History Teacher of the Year in 2009.

== See also ==
- Kannapolis City Schools also serves some residents of Rowan County.
- List of school districts in North Carolina
