= Royal Family Kids' Camps =

Royal Family Kids' Camps, Inc. (RFKC) is a network of camps, children's clubs, and child mentoring for abused, abandoned, and neglected children in the foster care system. RFK was founded in 1985 by Wayne and Diane Tesch. This ministry offers training and resources for local churches to sponsor a five-day summer camp for the children in foster care, ages 6 – 12.

In addition to the structured schedule, the summer camp maintains a ratio of one volunteer counselor for every two children. Including all volunteers in addition to counselors, there are more adults at the camps than children. Adult role models encourage positive experiences through a plethora of activities, including swimming, fishing, boating, jewelry-making, and woodworking. The highlight of the summer camp is the giant birthday party with cake and gifts for all campers. The group operates 159 camps in the United States and around the world, and has about 6,000 adult volunteers.
