= Jesse C. Carson High School =

American public school in North Carolina

Jesse C. Carson High
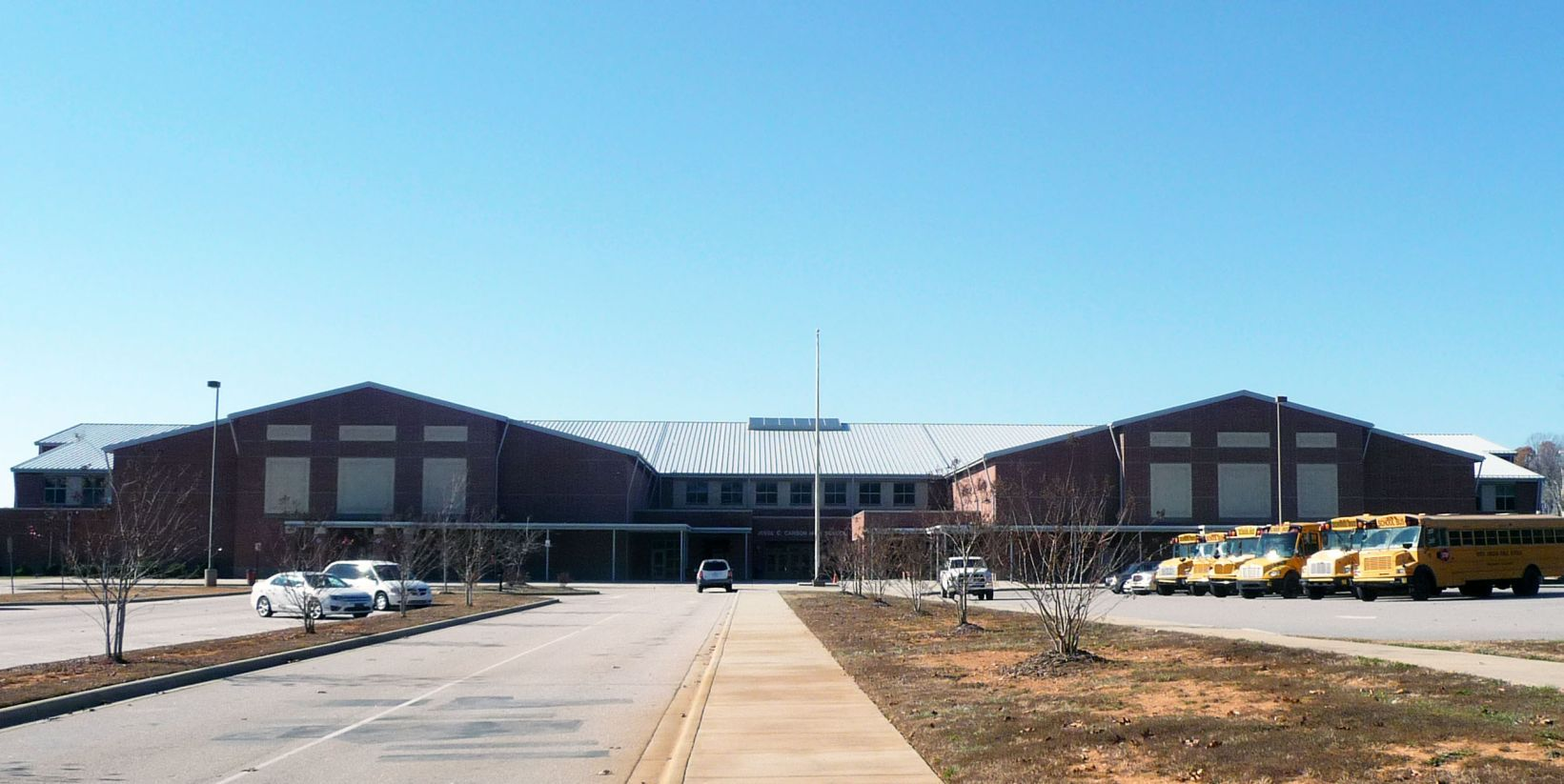
- Jesse C. Carson High School, November 2012

Location
- 290 Kress Venture Road; China Grove, North Carolina 28023; United States; 35°33′58″N 80°32′38″W

Information
- Type: Public
- Established: 2006 (20 years ago)
- CEEB code: 340734
- NCES School ID: 370405002882
- Principal: Benjamin Crawford
- Teaching staff: 60.57 (FTE)
- Enrollment: 1,135 (2023-2024)
- Student to teacher ratio: 18.74
- Colors: Victory Orange and Navy Blue
- Mascot: Cougars
- Website: Official website

Jesse C. Carson High School (often referred to as Carson High School or Carson) is a public, co-educational secondary school located in China Grove, NC. It is one of seven high schools in the Rowan-Salisbury School System.

== History ==
Jesse C. Carson High School opened in 2006, drawing students from four other high schools in Rowan County. It is named for Jesse C. Carson Jr. (1910–2003), a lifelong educator, World War II veteran, and former Rowan County School System Superintendent.

== Academics ==
Jesse C. Carson High School is consistently rated a "B" school by the NC Department of Public Instruction. Carson features an Academy of the Arts with concentrations in dance, choral and instrumental music, theater and visual arts. Carson also offers unique Project Lead the Way coursework in Biomedical Science and Engineering. In 2025, Carson launched a Global Logistics pathway, equipping students with the knowledge and skills needed to manage and optimize global supply chains, from sourcing raw materials to delivering finished products.

== Athletics ==
Jesse C. Carson High School is a member of the North Carolina High School Athletic Association (NCHSAA) and is classified as a 5A school. The school is a part of the South Piedmont Conference.

The women's basketball team won Carson's first state championship in 2021.

== Notable alumni ==
- Owen White, MLB pitcher
