= South Rowan High School =

American public school in North Carolina

Location
- 1655 Patterson Street; China Grove, North Carolina 28023; United States; 35°34′23″N 80°36′37″W

Information
- Type: Public
- Established: 1961 (65 years ago)
- CEEB code: 340731
- NCES School ID: 370405001629
- Principal: Jennifer Brayley
- Teaching staff: 51.43 (FTE)
- Enrollment: 952 (2022-2023)
- Student to teacher ratio: 18.51
- Campus type: Rural
- Colors: Red and black
- Mascot: Raiders
- Website: srhs.rssed.org

South Rowan High School is a public, co-educational secondary school located in China Grove, North Carolina. It is one of seven high schools in the Rowan-Salisbury School System

== History ==
South Rowan High School opened in 1961.

In 2006, the Rowan-Salisbury Board of Education made headlines when students at South Rowan started up a gay–straight alliance. In response to public complaint, led by Flip Benham of Operation Save America from neighboring Cabarrus county, the board adopted a policy banning "Sex-based student clubs" at all schools in the system.

Graduations are generally held at South Rowan's own James Donnell Stadium, on the school's campus.

== Demographics ==
For the 2010–11 school year, South Rowan High School had a total population of 966 students and 66.15 teachers on a (FTE) basis. The student population had a gender ratio of 51.04% male to 48.96% female. The demographic group makeup of the student population was: White, 81.88%; Hispanic, 9.01%; Black, 6.42%; American Indian, 0.62%; and Asian/Pacific Islander, 0.31% (two or more races, 1.76%). For the same school year, 43.79% of the students received free and reduced-cost lunches.

== Athletics ==
South Rowan is a member of the 4A NCHSAA Conference.

== Notable alumni ==
- Tommy Barnhardt — former NFL punter
- Daniel Hemric — current full-time NASCAR Xfinity Series and part-time NASCAR Cup Series driver for Kaulig Racing and 2021 NASCAR Xfinity Series champion
- Britt Nicole — vocalist, songwriter, and recording artist
- Joseph Poole — better known by his stage name Wednesday 13, singer and musician
- Brian Smith — former MLB pitcher
