= Owen White (baseball) =

American baseball player (born 1999)

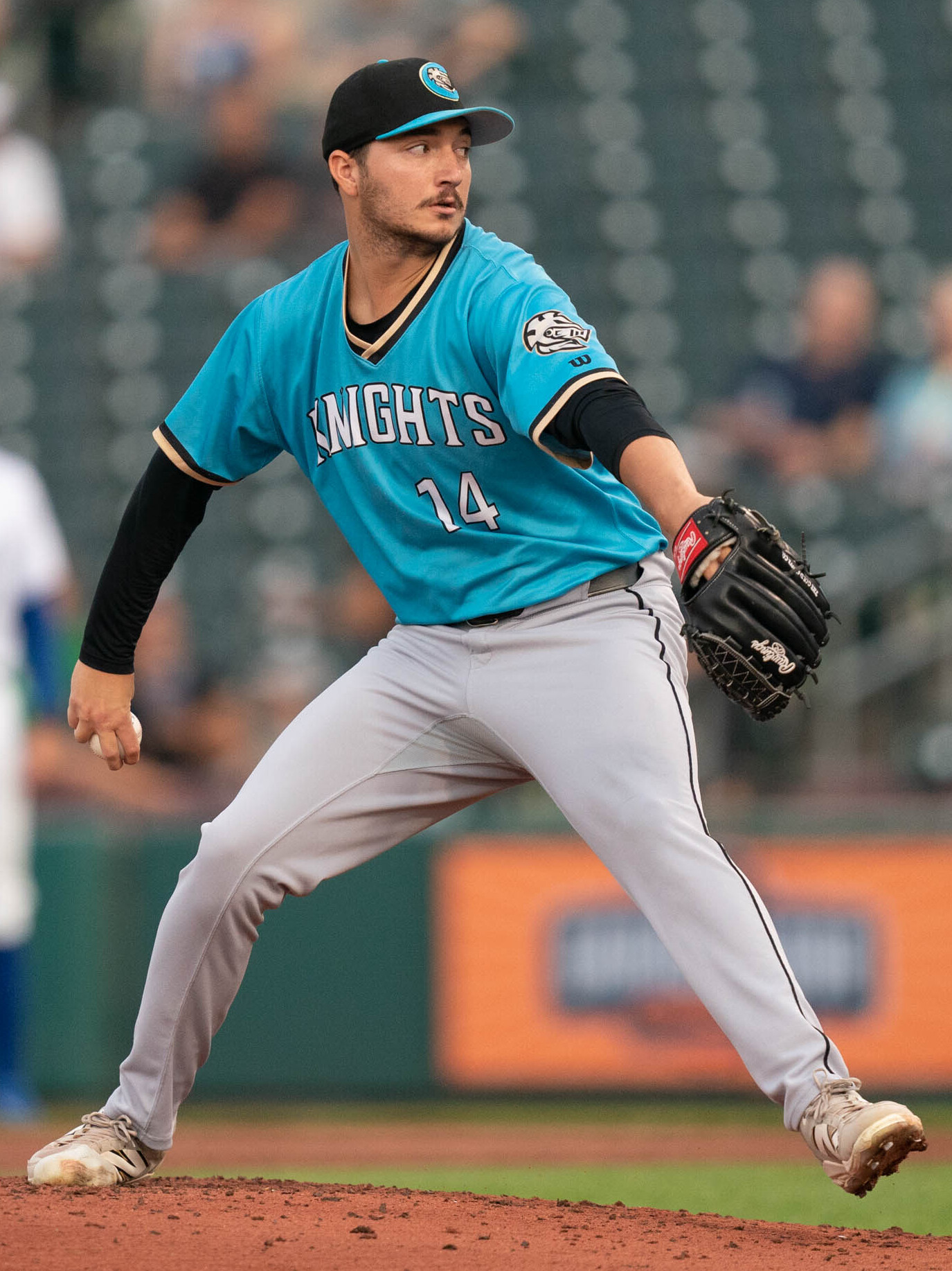
- White with the Charlotte Knights in 2025

Hanwha Eagles – No. 24
- Pitcher
- Born: August 9, 1999 (age 27); Mount Ulla, North Carolina, U.S.
- Bats: Right Throws: Right

Professional debut
- MLB: June 13, 2023, for the Texas Rangers
- KBO: March 31, 2026, for the Hanwha Eagles

MLB statistics (through 2025 season)
- Win–loss record: 0–1
- Earned run average: 12.86
- Strikeouts: 10

KBO statistics (through August 19, 2026)
- Win–loss record: 6-7
- Earned run average: 3.11
- Strikeouts: 72
- Stats at Baseball Reference

Teams
- Texas Rangers (2023–2024); Chicago White Sox (2025); Hanwha Eagles (2026–present)

William Timothy Owen White (born August 9, 1999) is an American professional baseball pitcher for the Hanwha Eagles of the KBO League. He has previously played in Major League Baseball (MLB) for the Texas Rangers and Chicago White Sox. He made his MLB debut in 2023.

== Amateur career ==
White attended Jesse C. Carson High School in China Grove, North Carolina. White was a three-sport athlete in high school, playing basketball through his senior year and quarterback on the football team through his junior season. White finished his senior season after posting a 10–1 record, 0.22 ERA, and 101 strikeouts in 63 2/3 innings. He was named the North Carolina Gatorade baseball Player of the Year for 2017–2018. White committed to play college baseball for the University of South Carolina Gamecocks.

== Professional career ==
=== Texas Rangers ===
The Texas Rangers selected White in the second round, with the 55th overall selection, of the 2018 Major League Baseball draft. He signed with Texas for a $1.5 million signing bonus.

After signing, White did not appear in an official game with a Rangers' affiliate in the 2018 season. Instead, he took part in a new program put in place by Texas for their newly drafted high school pitchers. The "de-load" program as the organization called it, emphasized building a foundation mentally and physically while resting the pitchers' bodies from a strenuous senior season and pre-draft showcase circuit. The players were put through a strength program and classroom work until the post-season fall instructional training started. White suffered a torn UCL and underwent Tommy John surgery in May 2019, causing him to miss the entire season. White did not play in 2020 due to the cancellation of the Minor League Baseball season because of the COVID-19 pandemic.

White spent the 2021 season with the Down East Wood Ducks of the Low-A East. In his first professional game, White struck the ground with his right hand after making a fielding error and fractured his hand. After making a rehab appearance with the ACL Rangers of the Rookie-level Arizona Complex League, he returned in August and finished the season posting a combined 4–1 record with a 3.06 ERA and 56 strikeouts over 35 1/3 innings. Following the 2021 season, White played for the Surprise Saguaros of the Arizona Fall League. White was named to the Fall League All-Star team. White was named the AFL Pitcher of Year, after posting a 5–0 record with a 1.91 ERA and 29 strikeouts over 28 1/3 innings.

White opened the 2022 season with the Hickory Crawdads of the High-A South Atlantic League. After going 6–2 with a 3.99 ERA and 81 strikeouts over 58 2/3 innings for Hickory, White was promoted to the Frisco RoughRiders of the Double-A Texas League in June. With Frisco he posted a 3–0 record with a 2.49 ERA and 23 strikeouts over 21 2/3 innings. White missed over two months with a right forearm strain, but returned in time to pitch in the Texas League playoffs. White was ranked as the 59th overall prospect in baseball by Baseball America, the 66th overall prospect by MLB.com, and the 70th overall prospect by The Athletic's Keith Law during the 2023 off-season. On November 15, 2022, the Rangers selected White to their 40-man roster to protect him from the Rule 5 draft.

White suffered neck inflammation in spring training and was optioned back to Frisco to begin the 2023 season. In 11 starts for Frisco, he registered a 2–3 record and 3.54 ERA with 45 strikeouts in 53 1/3 innings pitched. On June 13, 2023, White was promoted to the major leagues for the first time. He made his major league debut that night versus the Los Angeles Angels in relief, allowing three runs over two innings and suffering the loss. He was optioned back to Frisco following his debut. After a final appearance for Frisco, he was promoted to the Round Rock Express of the Triple-A Pacific Coast League on June 20. White was selected to represent Texas in the 2023 All-Star Futures Game.

White was optioned to Triple-A Round Rock to begin the 2024 season. White was called up on April 19, 2024. In 3 games for Texas, he struggled to a 24.00 ERA with no strikeouts across 3 innings of work. White was designated for assignment by the Rangers following the signing of Hoby Milner on December 20.

=== Chicago White Sox ===
On January 6, 2025, White was traded to the Cincinnati Reds for cash considerations. The Reds designated White for assignment on January 29. On February 5, White was claimed off waivers by the New York Yankees. He was again designated for assignment following the Yankees' acquisition of Brent Headrick on February 11. On February 17, White was claimed off waivers by the Chicago White Sox. He was optioned to the Triple-A Charlotte Knights before the 2025 season. He pitched twice in relief for the White Sox in June, then returned to the majors for one game in August, allowing 4 runs while getting only 1 out in a win over the Atlanta Braves on August 18. On October 13, White was removed from the 40-man roster and sent outright to Triple-A Charlotte. He elected free agency on November 6.

=== Hanwha Eagles ===
On December 16, 2025, White signed with the Hanwha Eagles of the KBO League.
