= China Grove Township, Rowan County, North Carolina =

Township in Rowan County, North Carolina, U.S.

Coordinates: 35.5670492°N 80.5660657°W

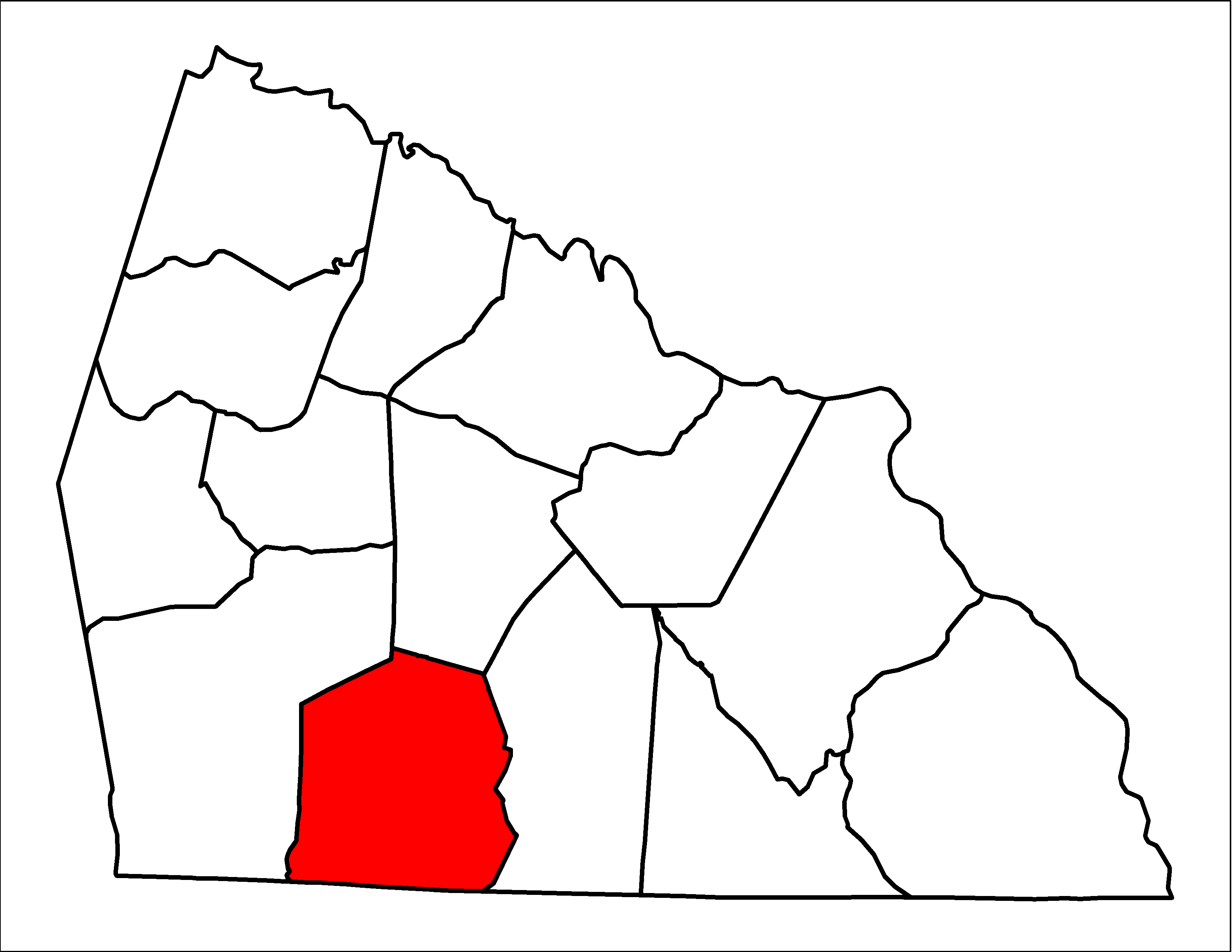
Location of China Grove Township in Rowan County, N.C.

China Grove Township is one of fourteen townships in Rowan County, North Carolina, United States. The township had a population of 23,348 according to the 2000 census.

Geographically, China Grove Township occupies 38.64 square miles (100.1 km^{2}) in southern Rowan County. Incorporated municipalities here include the town of China Grove, Landis, and portions of the Cabarrus County city of Kannapolis. The township's southern border is with Cabarrus County.
