= Gary Chapman (author) =

United States pastor, author of "The Five Love Languages"

The Reverend Gary Chapman
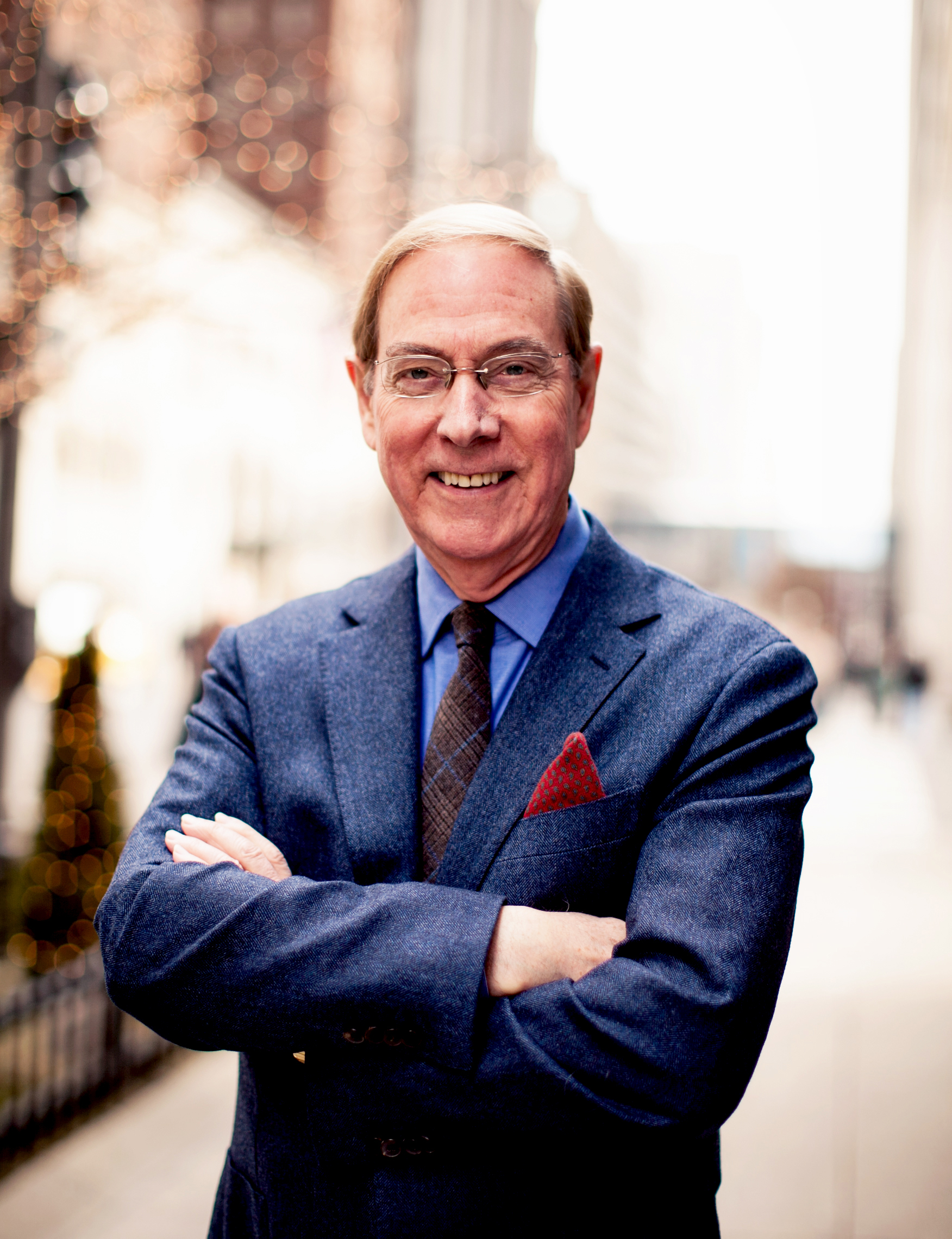
- Chapman in 2013
- Born: January 10, 1938 (age 88); China Grove, North Carolina, U.S.
- Occupations: American author and radio talk show host
- Known for: The Five Love Languages series of books
- Spouse: Karolyn J. Chapman
- Children: 2

Gary Demonte Chapman (born January 10, 1938) is an American author, radio talk show host, and Baptist minister. Chapman is most noted for his The Five Love Languages series regarding human relationships.

== Biography ==
Chapman was born on January 10, 1938, in China Grove, North Carolina.

Chapman joined the staff of Calvary Baptist Church in Winston-Salem, North Carolina, in 1971 and shares the responsibilities of teaching and family care.

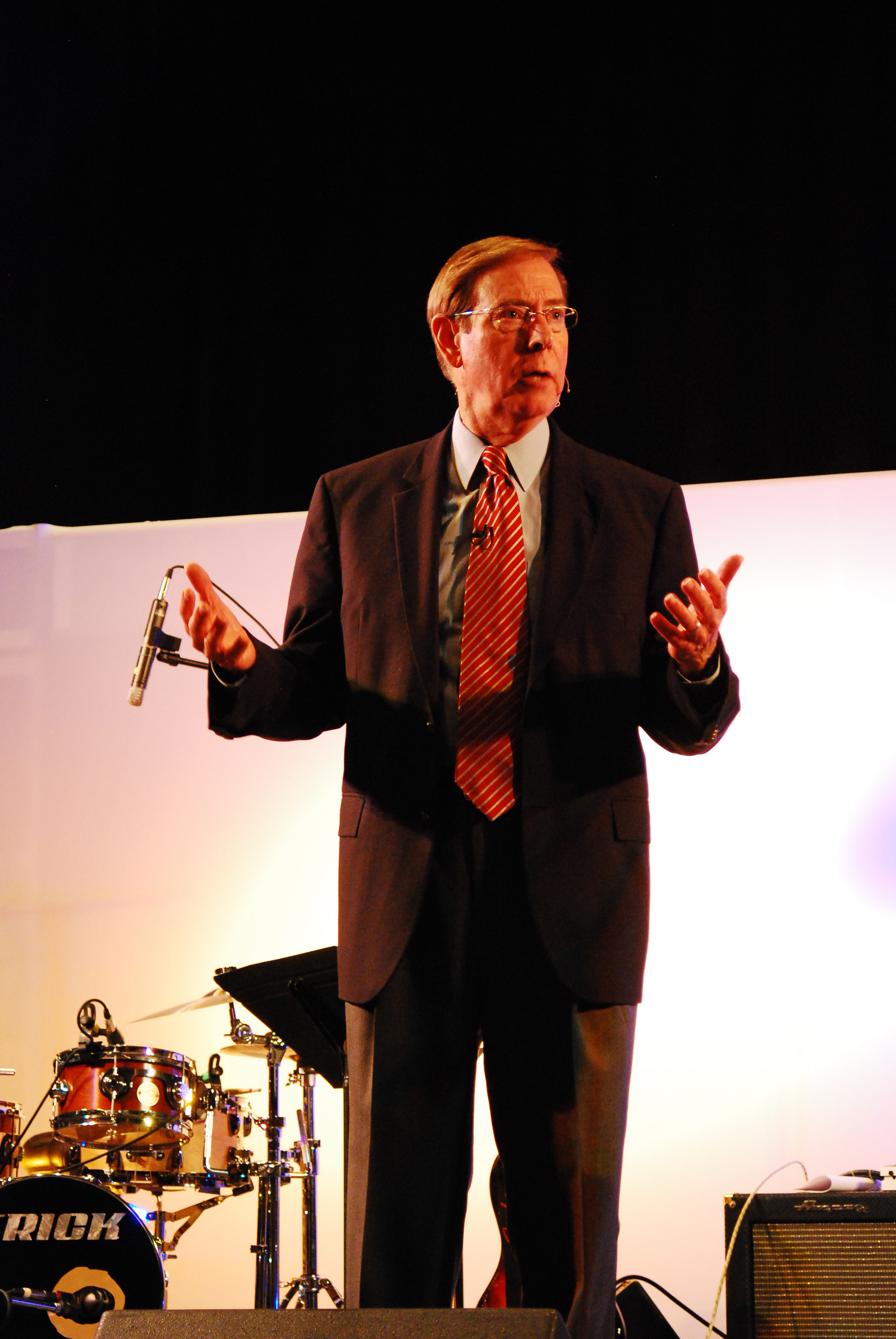
Chapman speaking at a conference in 2010.

Chapman is perhaps best known for his concept of "Five Love Languages", describing how people express and receive love through one of five "languages," specifically: words of affirmation, quality time, receiving gifts, acts of service, or physical touch. Chapman argues that, while each of these languages is enjoyed to some degree by all people, each person will usually favor one primary language.

The first of many books promoting the above concept was The Five Love Languages: How to Express Heartfelt Commitment to Your Mate, first published in 1992. The book has sold over 20 million copies in English and has been translated into 49 other languages.

He has also authored the Five Love Language concept books for parents of children and teenagers, single adults, and a special version for men. He has co-authored The Five Apology Languages with Dr. Jennifer Thomas, which focuses on giving and receiving apologies. The two of them co-authored “Making Things Right at Work” with Dr. Paul White. Chapman also co-authored The 5 Languages of Appreciation in the Workplace with White, applying the concepts to work-based relationships. Chapman travels the world presenting seminars on marriage, family, and relationships, and his radio programs air on more than 400 stations.

He is married to Karolyn J. Chapman. They have two adult children, Shelley and Derek.

== Scientific criticism ==
Chapman's model was based on his reported experience as a pastor advising couples, rather than grounded in any known scientific principles. There have been several research studies trying to evaluate Chapman's love languages framework, with mixed results. A 2022 study provided some evidence in favor of the love languages framework, while summarizing past empirical support for it as "equivocal." A recent article emphasized "a paucity of empirical work" and criticized the invalidity of the construct in several dimensions.

== Selected bibliography ==
- Gary Chapman (1992). The Five Love Languages: How to Express Heartfelt Commitment to Your Mate. Northfield Press. ISBN 978-0736934732.
- Gary Chapman, Ross Campbell, M.D. (1997). The Five Love Languages of our Children. Moody. ISBN 1-881273-65-2.
- Gary Chapman (2004). The Five Love Languages: Singles Edition. Northfield Press. ISBN 978-1-881273-87-5.
- Gary Chapman, Jennifer Thomas (2006). The Five Languages of Apology. Moody. ISBN 1-881273-57-1
- Gary Chapman (2009). The Marriage You've Always Wanted. Paperback: 160 pages. Moody Publishers; 1 edition (July 22, 2009). ISBN 978-0802472977.
