= Jack Melchor =

American engineer

- Born: July 6, 1925; Mooresville, North Carolina, US
- Died: September 5, 2015 (aged 90); Los Altos Hills, California, US
- Education: University of North Carolina; University of Notre Dame
- Spouse: Norma Bair (m. 1946; died 2012)
- Children: 4

Jack Leon Melchor (July 6, 1925 – September 5, 2015) was an American engineer and venture capitalist who is considered a major figure in the early commercial history of Silicon Valley.

== Early life and education ==
Melchor was born in Mooresville, North Carolina, and raised in China Grove, North Carolina. During World War II, he participated in the V-12 Navy College Training Program and was commissioned an ensign in the United States Navy.

Following the war, Melchor completed his Bachelor of Science and Master of Science in Physics from the University of North Carolina at Chapel Hill and received a PhD from the University of Notre Dame in 1953.

== Career ==
After completing his doctoral work, Melchor relocated to California where he began employment at Sylvania Electronic Defense Labs. In the 1950s he established his own company, Melabs, which he sold in 1960 after developing six microwave technology patents. The following year, he was hired as president of Hewlett-Packard Associates, a subsidiary of Hewlett-Packard.

After leaving Hewlett-Packard in 1968, Melchor became a technology-focused venture capitalist through his own firm. Described by the Los Altos Town Crier as a "key figure in the early days of Silicon Valley", he is credited with either starting or helping to finance more than 100 companies, including 3Com, The Learning Company, and Osborne Computer.

Melchor retired in 1980 but returned to work shortly thereafter advising the British government on venture operations, for which he took a nominal salary of one pound annually. He retired a final time in 1990.

Melchor was a fellow of the Institute of Electrical and Electronics Engineers.

== Personal life ==
Melchor was married to his wife, Norma (née Bair), from 1946 until her 2012 death. They had four children. He was a longtime resident of Los Altos, California.

With Norma Melchor, Jack Melchor was a regular guest at Claridge's. The couple stayed at the London hotel annually for a period of 40 years and were interviewed in the BBC documentary about it, Inside Claridge's.

Melchor endowed professorships in physics at both the University of North Carolina and the University of Notre Dame, and donated millions of dollars to El Camino Hospital, at which the Melchor Pavilion is named in his honor. He was a regular donor to the congressional campaigns of Tom Campbell. Melchor also volunteered as president of the Montclaire School PTA, as a Cub Scouts den master, and as a member of the University of Notre Dame Engineering Advisory Council. He was named "Los Altan of the Year" for 2007 by the Los Altos Town Crier and received the University of Notre Dame's 1967 Centennial of Science citation.
