= Dillon Stevens =

American actor, dancer, and singer

- Born: April 23, 1997 (age 29); Concord, North Carolina
- Years active: 2009–present

Dillon Jeffrey Stevens (born April 23, 1997) is an actor, dancer, and singer born in Concord, North Carolina. Stevens currently resides in Chicago, Illinois.

== Career ==
Stevens began his dance training with Center Stage Dance Company in China Grove, North Carolina at the age of five. He has been dancing there for almost 10 years.

Stevens has performed as a tap soloist at "Showstopper" regionals as well as performing in the opening number for Nationals in Myrtle Beach in 2009.

After being discovered by a New York "Older Billy" at Encore DCS Nationals in Charleston, South Carolina in 2009, Stevens was cast in the role of Michael in the Chicago production of Billy Elliot The Musical.

He graduated from Jesse Carson High School in June 2015.

== Stage Credits ==
| Date | Production | Role | Theatre |
|---|---|---|---|
| March 18, 2010 – November 28, 2010 | Billy Elliot the Musical | Michael | Ford Center for the Performing Arts Oriental Theatre |
| February 1, 2011 – September 3, 2011 | Billy Elliot the Musical | Michael | Canon Theatre |
