= Quality time =

Periods proactively spent with one's loved ones

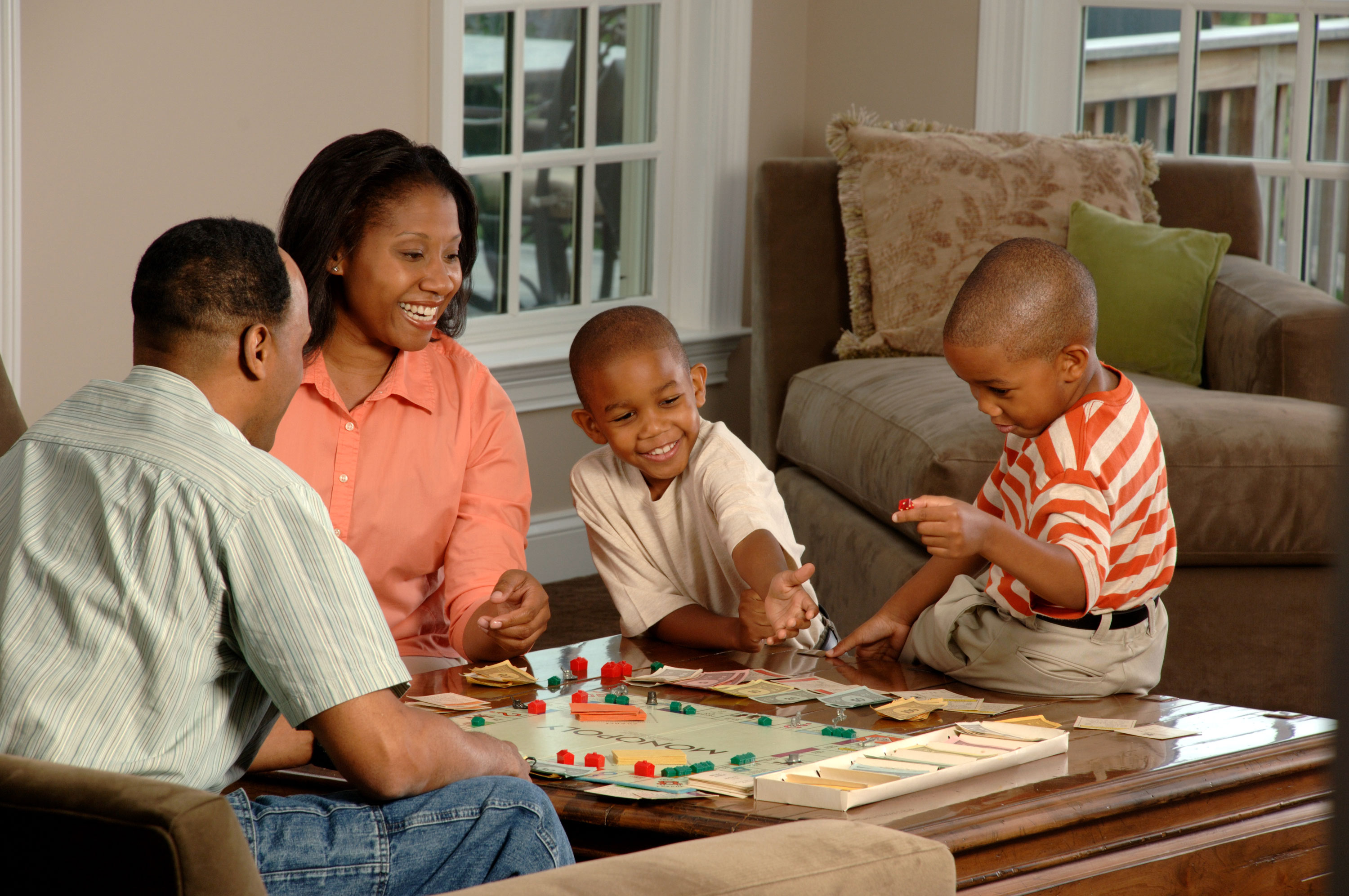
A family plays a game of Monopoly. Social play through board games are an examples of quality time.

In sociology, quality time (QT) is time spent on proactive interaction between individuals, set aside for paying undivided attention, usually to express love or accomplish a shared goal. It is an informal reference to time spent with close family, partners, or friends that is in some way important, special, productive or profitable to one or everyone involved. Having conversations, solving jigsaw puzzles, collaborating on projects, and conversing during road trips can be examples of quality time. It may also refer to the effective use of time in educational settings, or time spent alone performing a favorite activity (i.e., self-care).

In his 1992 book, Baptist pastor and Relationship counselor Gary Chapman suggests that quality time is one of five "Love Languages" which are used (more or less, preferentially, by a given individual) to express love and gratitude for another.

== History ==
Later-born siblings tend to have lower levels of educational attainment, a result attributed to factors such as having less quality time with parents, and exposure to more pathogens from older siblings.

Its use as a noun expression ("quality time") began in the 1970s. One of the earliest records of this phrase in print was in the Annapolis newspaper The Capital, January 1973, in the article "How To Be Liberated":

The major goal of each of these role changes is to give a woman time to herself, Ms. Burton explained. "A woman's right and responsibility is to be self fulfilling," she said. She gives "quality time" rather than "quantity time" to each task, whether it be writing, cleaning the house or tending the children.

In the context of public schooling, the National Commission on Excellence in Education began to use the phrase circa 1983. "Quality time" was described in a 1983 letter by the principal of Hampton High School to U.S. Secretary of Education Terrell Bell. Principal Scholtz wrote, "Quality time will be enhanced by reducing that time spent by teachers on discipline and on administrative duties" and thereby "freeing teachers to do what they do best...teach".

By 1985, the phrase was in common use in books about parenting and parenting styles. Examples include A Parents' Guide to Quality Time with Preschoolers (1984), The Quality Time Almanac: A Sourcebook of Ideas and Activities for Parents and Kids (1986), and Parentips: Quality Time with Kids (1986).

Gary Champan's 1992 book The Five Love Languages defined and popularized the phrase's contemporary usage.

Quality Time is also the title of a 1996 fiction (likely romance) novel by British author Norma Curtis.

The Time Bind, a 1997 book, was mentioned in Newsweek's multi-page feature about "The Myth of Quality Time". The same issue of Newsweek had a full-page review of another 1997 book, Time for Life, which emphasizes that most people have a flawed "ability to separate faulty perception of time use from reality." Author Robinson's diary-based research shows that 15 hours per week of "free time" (the greatest category of time used) goes into TV viewing.

== Examples ==
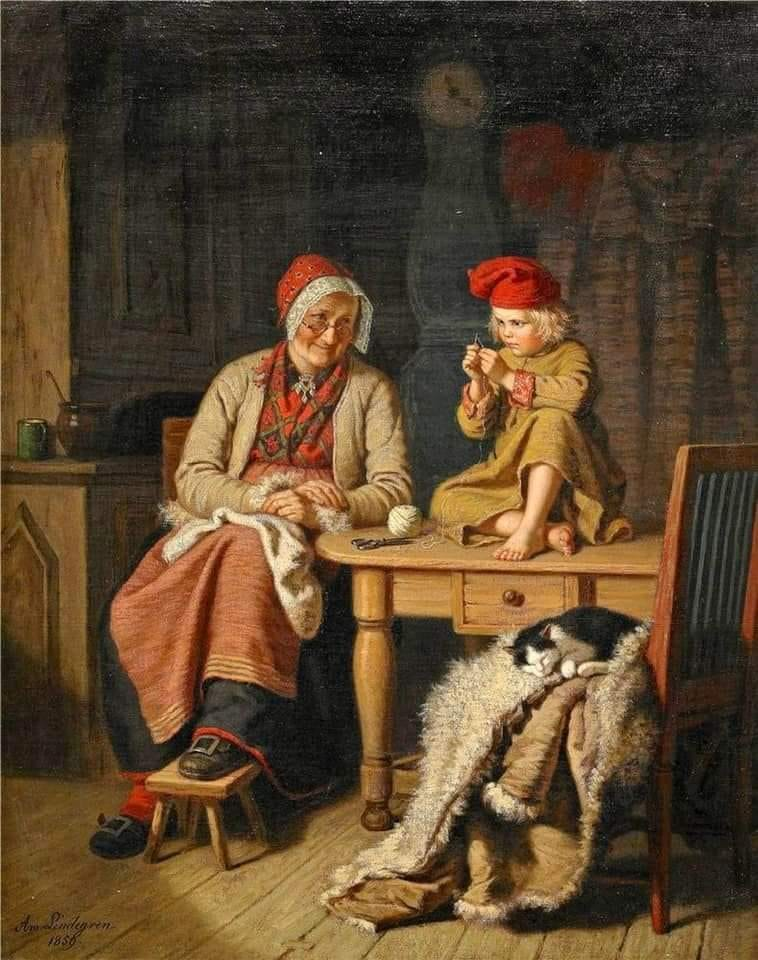
Swedish painter Amalie Lindegren's 1858 painting, "A grandmother with a grandson threading a needle"

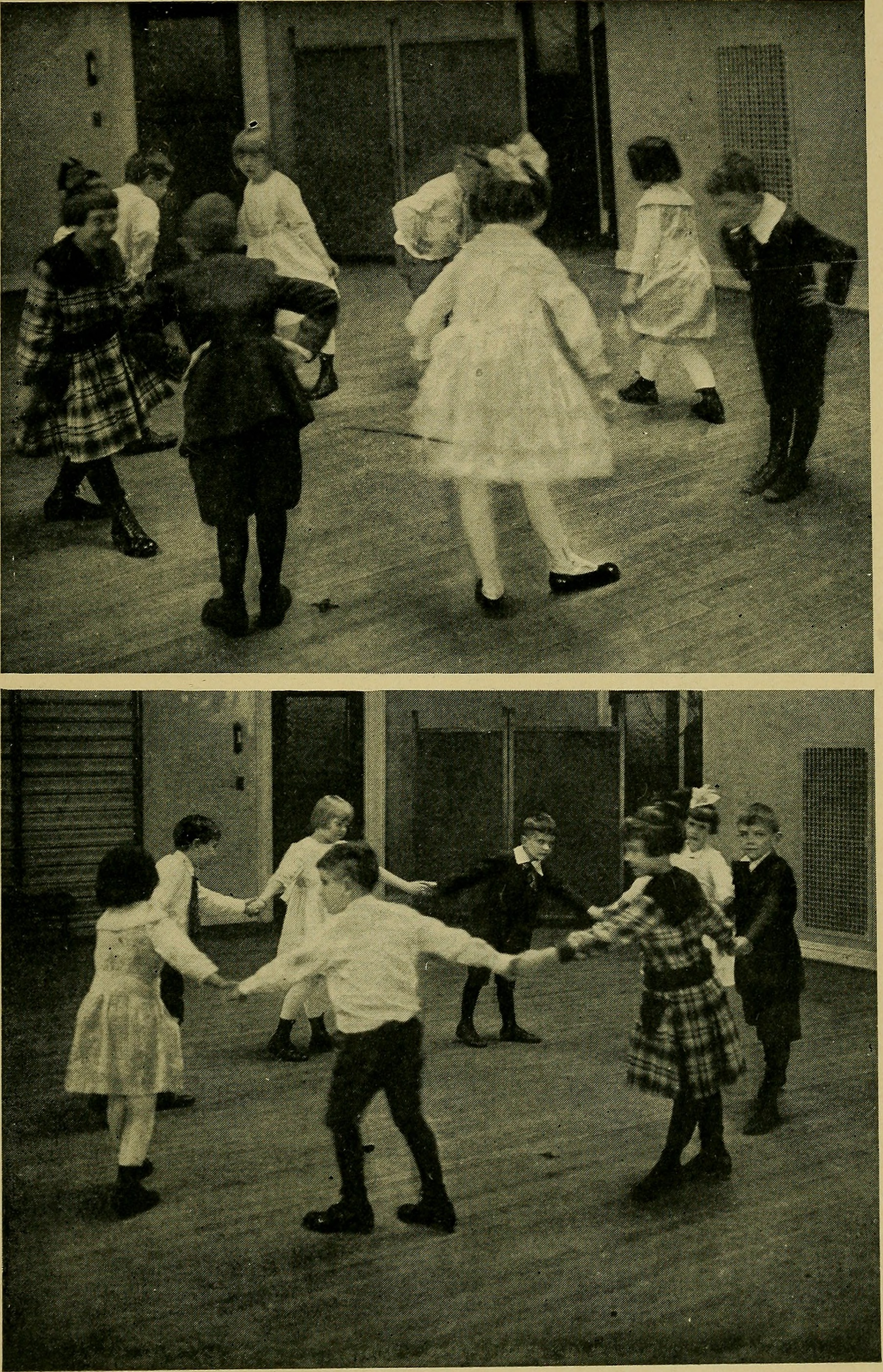
Children engage in social dancing and singing games, 1920.

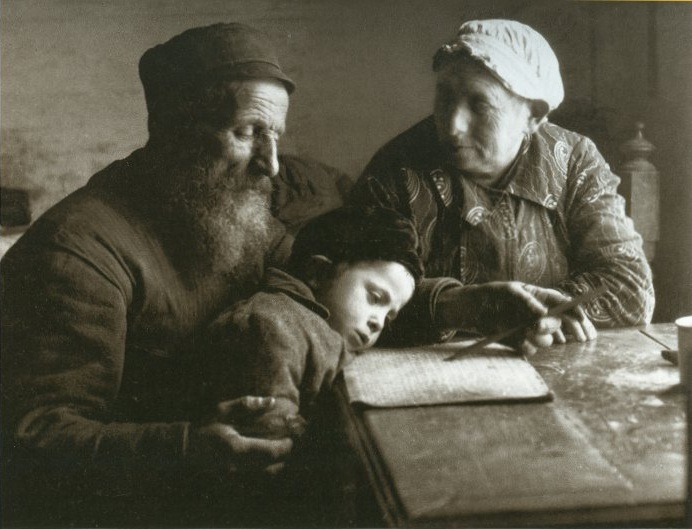
Polish Jewish grandparents in Biala Podlaska teach their grandson to read, 1920.

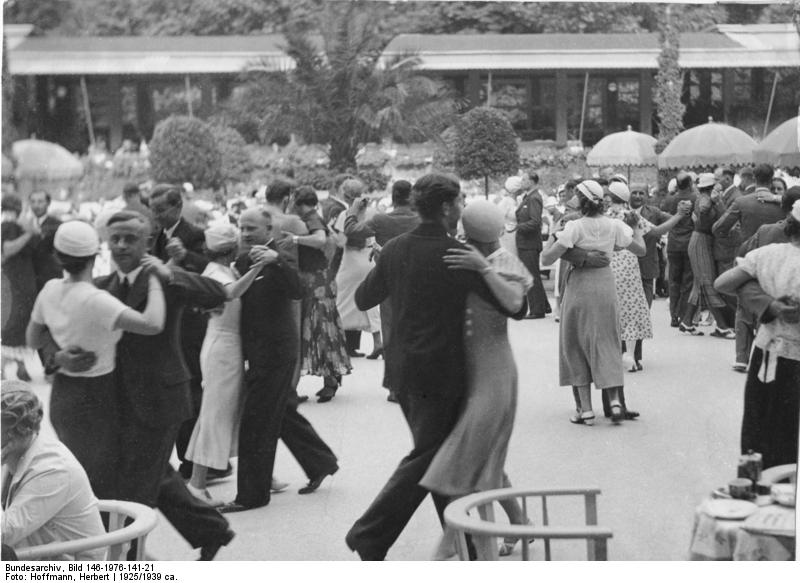
Couples share quality time through dance in Berlin, Germany, 1925.

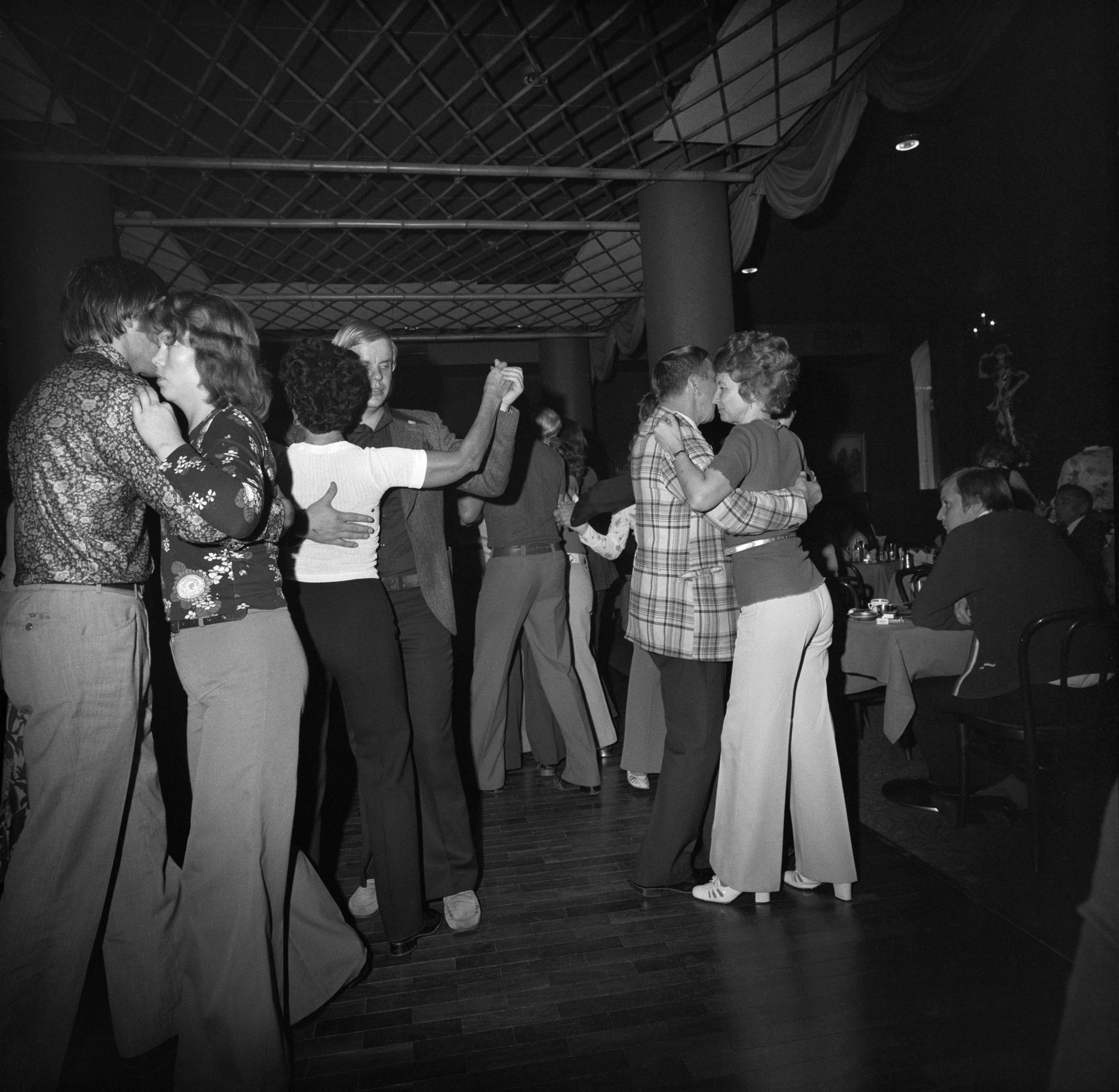
Working-class couples share quality time through dance in Tenho, Finland, 1974.

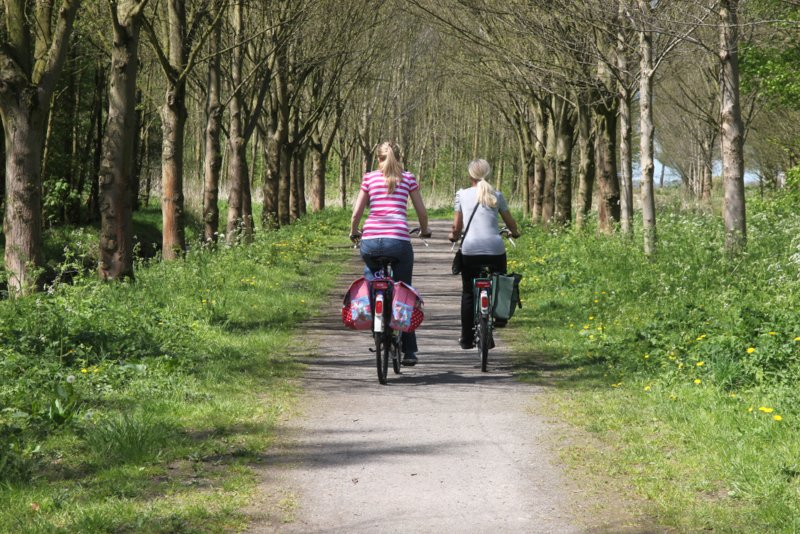
Mother and daughter bicycling together, 2012.

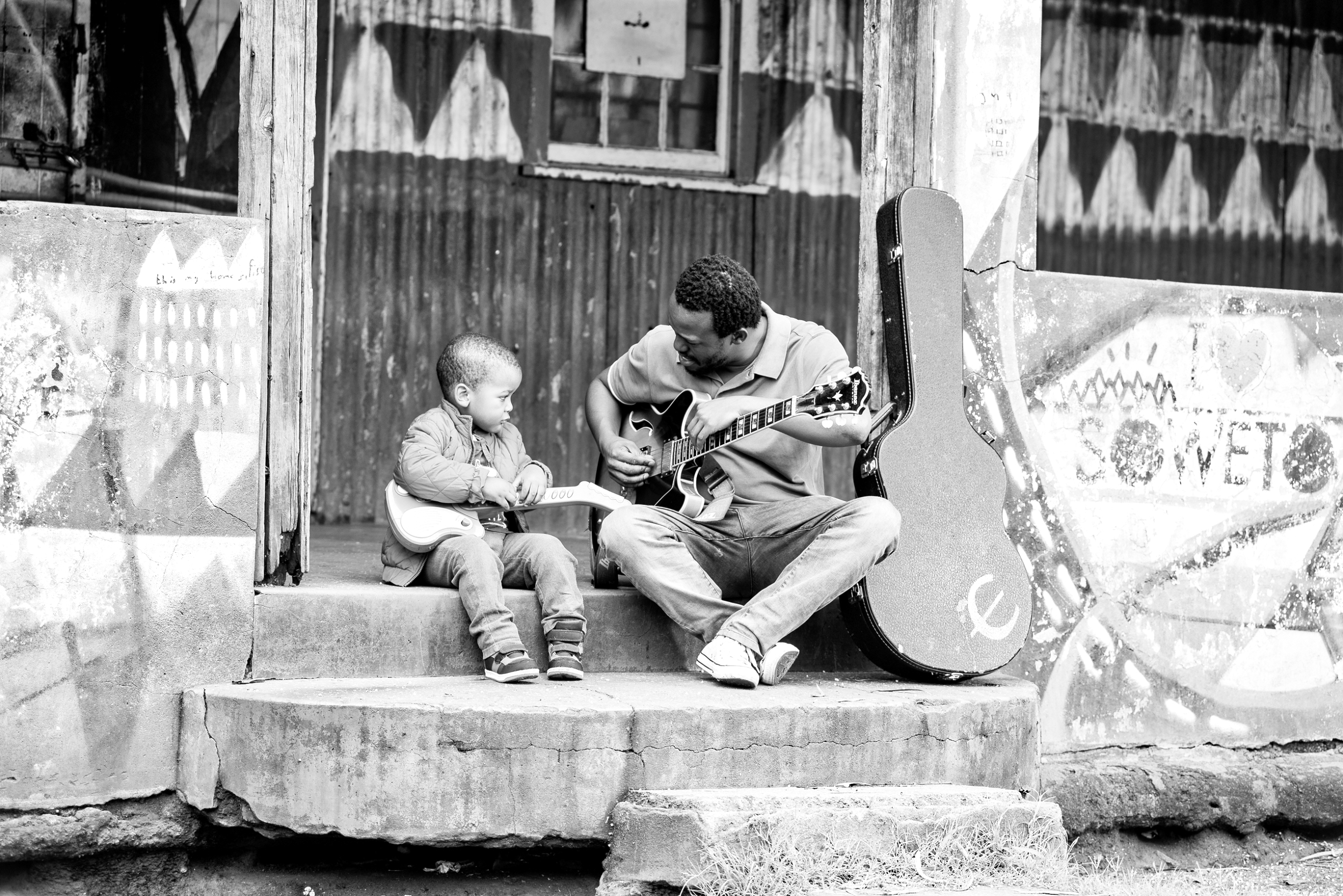
Guitarist Simphiwe Sekhute plays music with his son in South Africa, 2013.

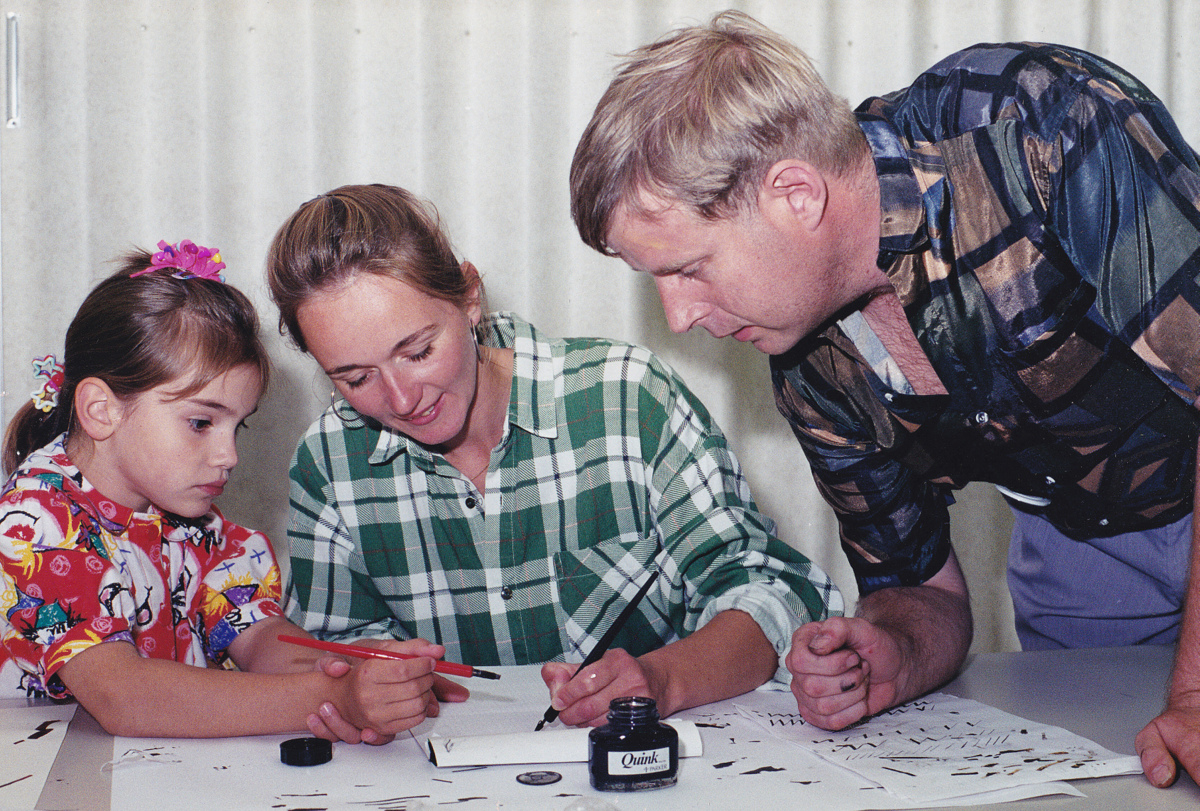
A mother and daughter learn calligraphy together, 2013.

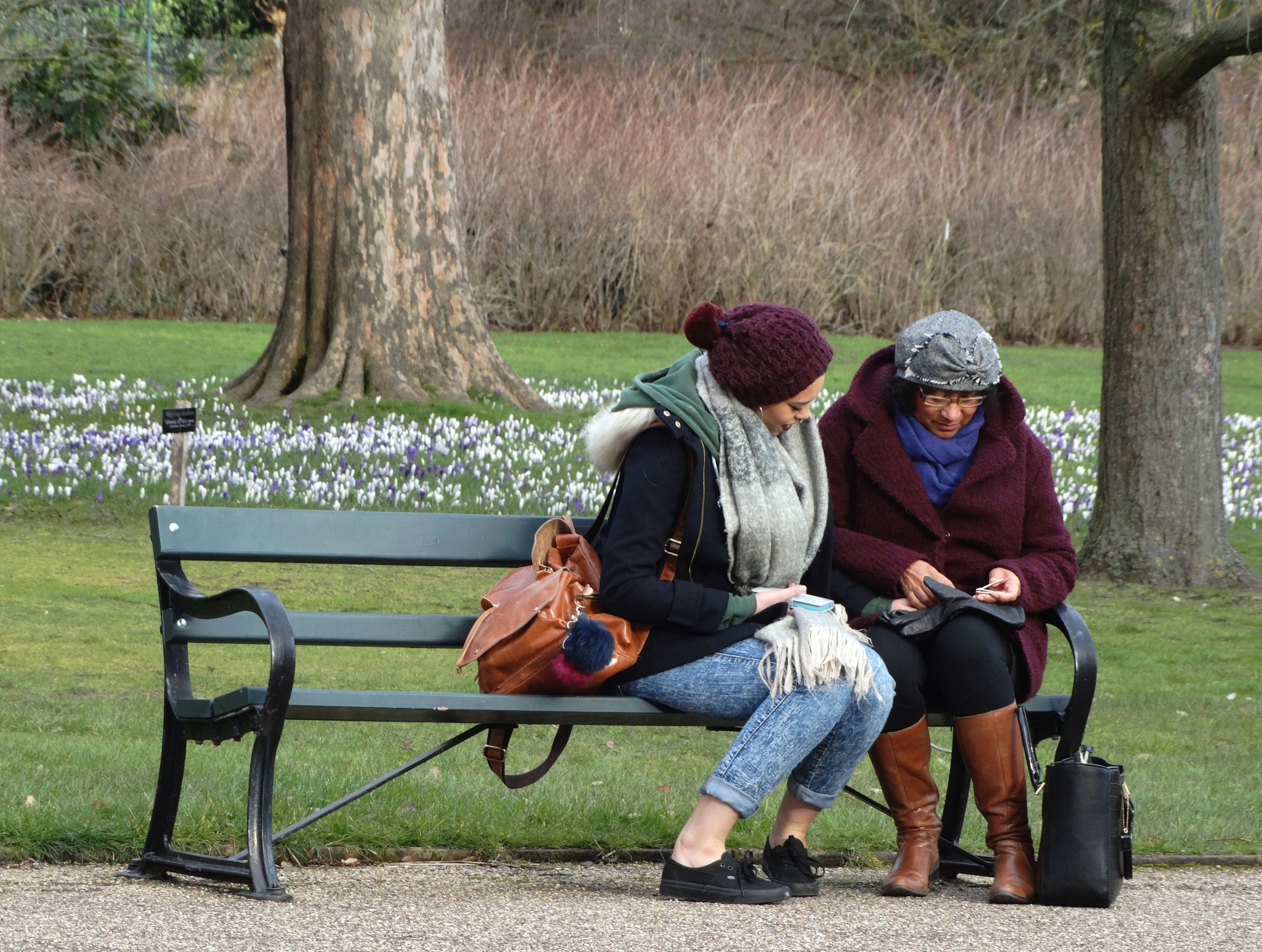
An adult mother and daughter converse in England's Sheffield Park and Garden, 2016.

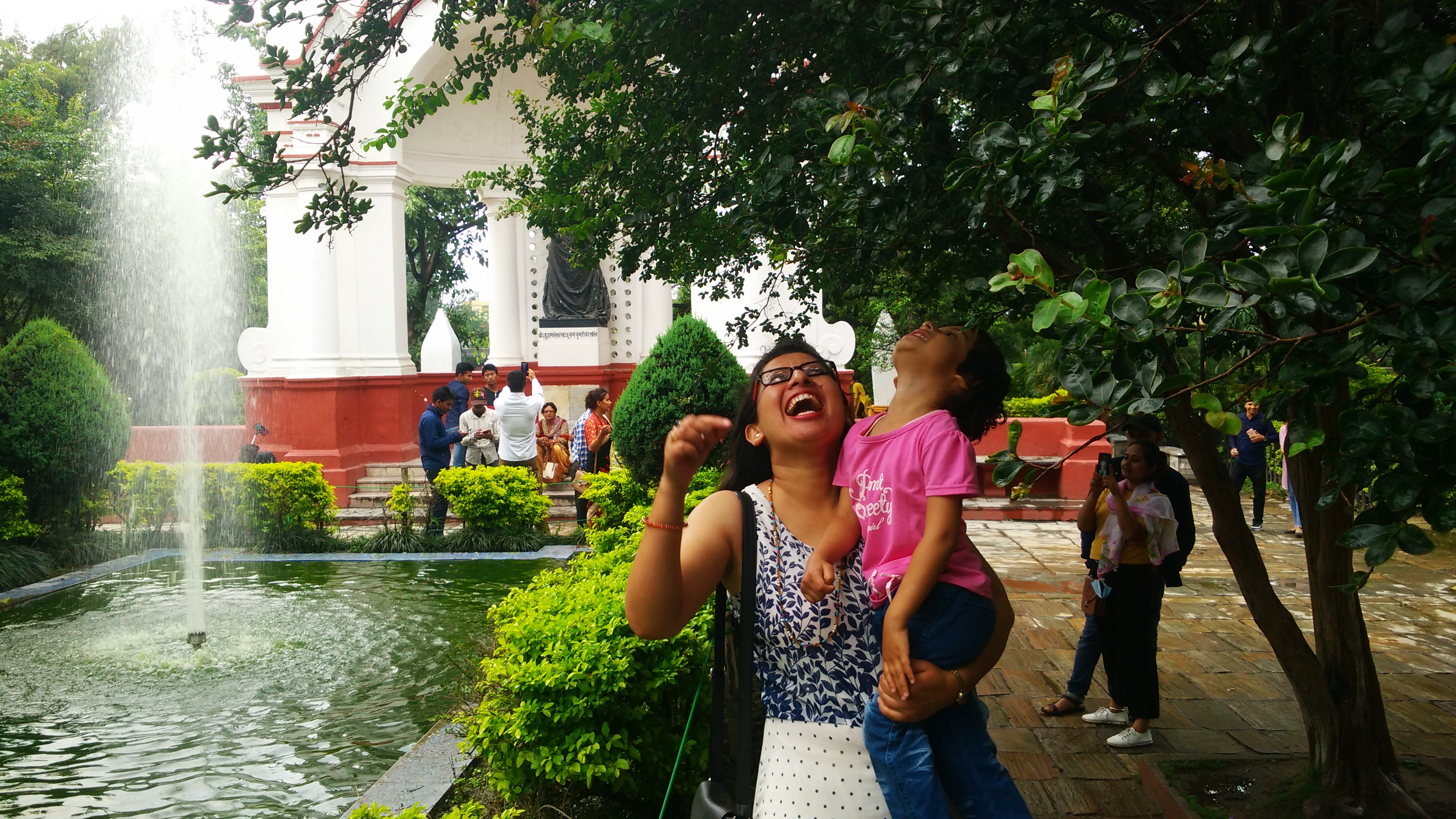
Nepalese mother and daughter enjoy an outing, 2018.

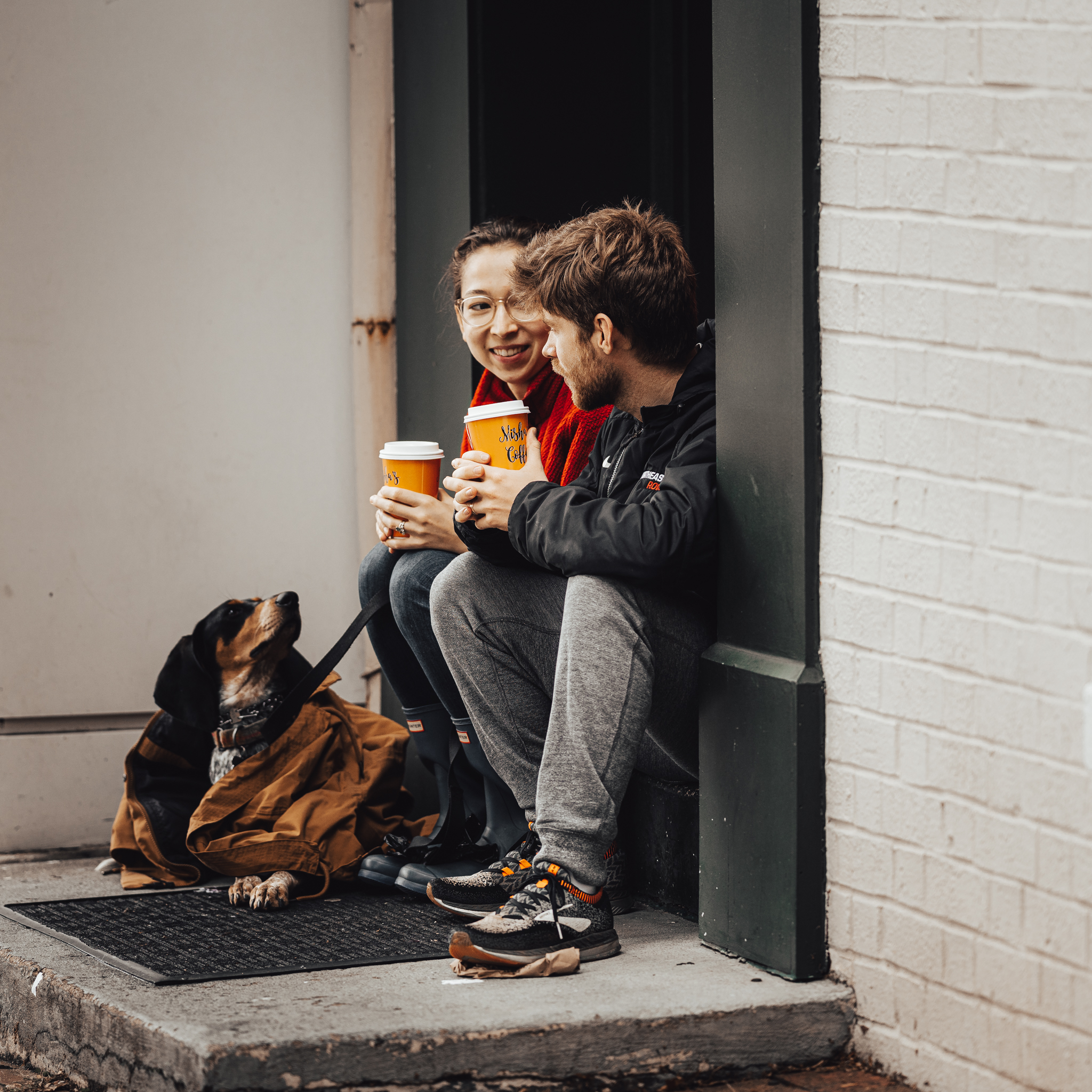
Two individuals engage in a quality time conversation in Old Town Alexandria, 2021.

== See also ==
- Dialogue
- Double burden
- Gemütlichkeit
- Kids' club
- Work–family balance in the United States
- Work–family conflict
- Work–life balance
