= Kids' club =

A kids' club, children's club or mini club is a childcare facility (daycare), which includes a fully staffed mini playground or complete village specially designed for children; is usually offered by private companies, cruise lines, health fitness clubs, major sports events, and trade fairs. and educates and engages children for short periods of time (2–3 h) or for the whole day depending on how long the parents are needing the care for. Kids are entertained in a playful, dynamic, and stylish environment. Kids' clubs offer a wide range of activities such as art, music and dancing, maritime and animal experiences, cookery and nature experiences, language and sports lessons, etc. Often clubs require babies and toddlers under the age of two to have adult attendants with them. This can be provided by the kids' club in the form of an extra babysitter for a cost, or their guardians will be required to remain with them.

Family lifestyle, luxury magazines or blogs are specialized on lifestyle and quality time, kids' clubs, family friendly venues, travel, luxury.

Another definition for kids' club is a kind of fan club, created not around a celebrity, but rather around a commercial entity that caters to children or families, or the entity's mascot. Kids' clubs serve as a promotional tool for such entities, trading discount coupons, exclusive items, a newsletter and other offerings in exchange for family goodwill and a measure of marketing and demographic information.

Memberships in such clubs are usually restricted to children twelve or less years old, and members are typically presented with an assortment of standard fan club items: A welcome letter, a membership card (which may double as a discount or premium card at outlets), a club pin or badge, an "autographed photo" of the mascot or spokesperson, a pad of letterheaded notepaper, other possible souvenirs (including a catalog or price list of more available items), and occasional mailings, usually to promote special events or member's exclusives. Some clubs encourage their members to form chapters and invite friends to join, and may offer a "club kit" with chapter materials and suggestions, sometimes for a fee, or free in exchange for member information.

Examples of this type of club include the Big Boy Club, the Sofia Kids' Club of Esfahan (Persian: کلوپ کوچولوها), the Ronald McDonald Club, Burger King Kids [sic] Club, the Fox Kids [sic] Club, the former Sambo's Restaurants Tiger Club, and other retail chain clubs.

== See also ==
- Ovaltineys
