= The Five Love Languages =

1992 book by Gary Chapman

- Author: Gary Chapman
- Original title: The Five Love Languages: How to Express Heartfelt Commitment to Your Mate
- Language: English
- Subject: Intimate relationships
- Publisher: Northfield Publishing
- Publication date: 1992
- Publication place: United States
- ISBN: 978-0-7369-3473-2
- Text: The Five Love Languages online

The Five Love Languages: How to Express Heartfelt Commitment to Your Mate is a 1992 nonfiction book by Baptist pastor Gary Chapman. It outlines five general ways that romantic partners express and experience love, which Chapman calls "love languages". Empirical evidence does not strongly support its core claims.

== Summary ==
According to Chapman, the five "love languages" are:

- Words of affirmation - Showing love through verbal appreciation, compliments, and encouragement
- Quality time - Showing love by giving undivided attention, engaging in meaningful conversations, and participating in various activities together
- Gifts - Showing love through thoughtful and meaningful gifts that symbolize appreciation and affection
- Acts of service - Showing love by performing various tasks that are helpful and ease the partner’s burdens
- Physical touch - Showing love through physical gestures such as hugging, kissing, holding hands, and sex

Chapman provides various examples from his counseling sessions and includes questions to help readers identify both their own and their partner's primary and secondary love languages. According to Chapman's theory, each person has one primary and one secondary love language. Further love languages are optional.

To determine another person’s love language, Chapman suggests observing how they express love to others, and analyze what they complain about most often and what they request from their significant other most often. He theorizes that people tend to naturally give love in the way that they prefer to receive love, and better communication between couples can be accomplished when one can demonstrate caring to the other person in the love language that resonates mostly with their partner’s love language.

An example would be: if a husband's love language is acts of service, he may be confused when he does the laundry and his wife does not perceive that as an act of love, viewing it as simply performing household duties, because the love language she comprehends is words of affirmation (verbal affirmation that he loves her). She may try to use what she values, words of affirmation, to express her love to him, which he would not value as much as she does. If she understands his love language and mows the lawn for him, he perceives it in his love language as an act of expressing her love for him; likewise, if he tells her he loves her, she values that as an act of love.

== Reception ==
=== Commercial ===
The book sold 8,500 copies in its first year, four times what the publisher expected. The following year it sold 17,000, and two years later, 137,000. As of 2013 it had spent 297 weeks on the New York Times Best Seller list.

=== Scientific ===
Scientific studies on the validity of love languages have yielded mixed or inconclusive results, with much research leaning toward refuting the concept. Psychologist Julie Schwartz Gottman has cast doubt on the concept of a "primary" love language and the usefulness of insisting on showing or receiving love in only one way. A 2006 confirmatory factor analysis study by Nicole Egbert and Denise Polk suggests that the five love languages may have some degree of psychometric validity.

A 2017 study published in Personal Relationships involving 67 heterosexual couples found limited evidence that synchronized love languages correlated with relationship satisfaction. 2023 review of the concept of love languages by relationship scientists strongly suggest that this theory lacks empirical support: existing research does not confirm that individuals reliably have a preferred love language, nor that couples who “speak” the same love language consistently experience higher relationship quality.

Empirical evidence does not strongly support its core claims; lasting love requires diverse relational behaviors rather than speaking a single preferred language.

== Related works ==
Since 1992, Chapman has written several books related to The Five Love Languages that adapt its principles to different contexts:

- "The Five Love Languages of Children" (1997) – Adapts the concepts for parents to better understand and show their love to their children.
- "The Five Love Languages for Singles" (2004) – Adapts the principles for individuals who are not in romantic relationships.
- "The 5 Languages of Appreciation in the Workplace" (2011) – Co-written with Dr. Paul White. This book explores how the love languages framework can be applied to professional settings to enhance workplace relationships and morale.
- "The Five Love Languages Military Edition" (2013) – Co-written with Jocelyn Green. This book focuses on how the principles can be used to strengthen relationships in military families.
