= Operation Save America =

Fundamentalist Christian protest group

- Formation: 1986
- Founded at: United States
- Type: Nonprofit
- Purpose: Christian fundamentalism; Anti-abortion; Abortion law; Opposition to Islam; Opposition to LGBTQ rights
- Headquarters: United States
- Location: United States
- Region served: United States
- Official language: English
- Website: operationsaveamerica.org

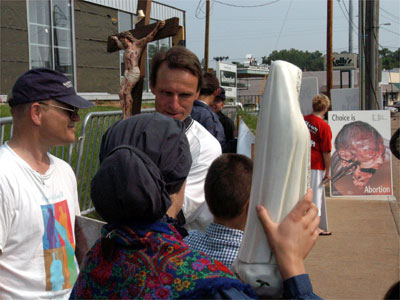
Operation Save America members protest in front of an abortion clinic in Jackson, Mississippi, during their 2006 National Event in that city.

Operation Save America (formerly Operation Rescue National) is a fundamentalist Christian conservative organization based in Concord, North Carolina, a suburb of Charlotte, that opposes human induced abortion and its legality, Islam, and homosexuality. In 1994, Flip Benham became the director of the organization, then called Operation Rescue National. Benham replaced Keith Tucci, who had replaced Randall Terry. Terry, Tucci and Benham have all been convicted of crimes related to their protest activities. Rusty Thomas became the national director after Flip Benham stepped down.

Jason Storms is the national director as of 2025.

== Background ==
In the late 1990s, Benham abandoned the name of Operation Rescue, and changed the name of his organization to Operation Save America. Once Newman's organization (the former Operation Rescue West or California Operation Rescue) began to grow in prominence and use the name Operation Rescue, Benham also began using the name Operation Rescue. After a feud with Newman, and after Benham was named in a lawsuit from the United States Department of Justice, Benham officially changed the name of Operation Rescue National to Operation Save America.

Meanwhile, Benham broadened the scope of Operation Save America to include criticism of homosexuality, pornography, and Islam, and formed alliances with other Christian conservative groups and the Constitution Party. In 2002, Benham moved Operation Save America's headquarters from their longtime home in Dallas, Texas to Concord. In 2014 Operation Save America's new director Rev. Rusty Thomas moved the headquarters back to Dallas, Texas.

== Activities ==
Operation Save America conducts mass protests at abortion clinics to promote an anti-abortion cause. Operation Save America has mobilized its members for other causes common to the Christian right, for example, opposition to Gay-straight alliances in public schools. At South Rowan High School, near Charlotte, when a Gay-Straight Alliance was forming at that school in 2006, Operation Save America arranged to have some 700 people to show up at the school board meeting and get the board to ban the club from the school.

They have also been involved in burning the Islamic holy text, the Quran, despite the opposition of most of the Muslim community to the practice of abortion. Their actions have been described as "an affront to Islam, all people of faith, and to our society as a whole... not Christian [and] not American" by the Mississippi Religious Leadership Conference.

On July 12, 2007, three members of the organization (Ante and Kathy Pavkovic, and their daughter Kristen) were arrested after they tried to shout down a Hindu clergyman as he offered the traditional morning prayer on the US Senate floor. The protest was denounced by Barry W. Lynn, executive director of Americans United for Separation of Church and State.

On July 20, 2014, members of the organization interrupted a worship service at the First Unitarian Universalist Church of New Orleans. During a moment of silence for a member of the church who had died in the previous week, OSA member Deanna Waller began to speak about "abominations." Rev. Deanna Vandiver, a guest pastor who was leading the service, asked Waller and the other OSA members either to remain and be respectful of the service or to depart; church members escorted Waller and the more vocal OSA protestors out of the service, while others remained until the service was over, and attempted to engage church members during the coffee hour. Vandiver described the intrusion as "religious terrorism"; on its website, OSA described their action as presenting "the truth of the Gospel in this synagogue of Satan."

On July 21, 2017, concern was expressed by national and local leaders over plans for rallies and protests starting Saturday, July 22, 2017.

On August 2, 2022, a Tennessee federal judge issued a restraining order against the organization after several of their members were arrested during protests at clinics in Nashville, Tennessee and Mount Juliet, Tennessee in late July.
