= China Grove, North Carolina =

- Town
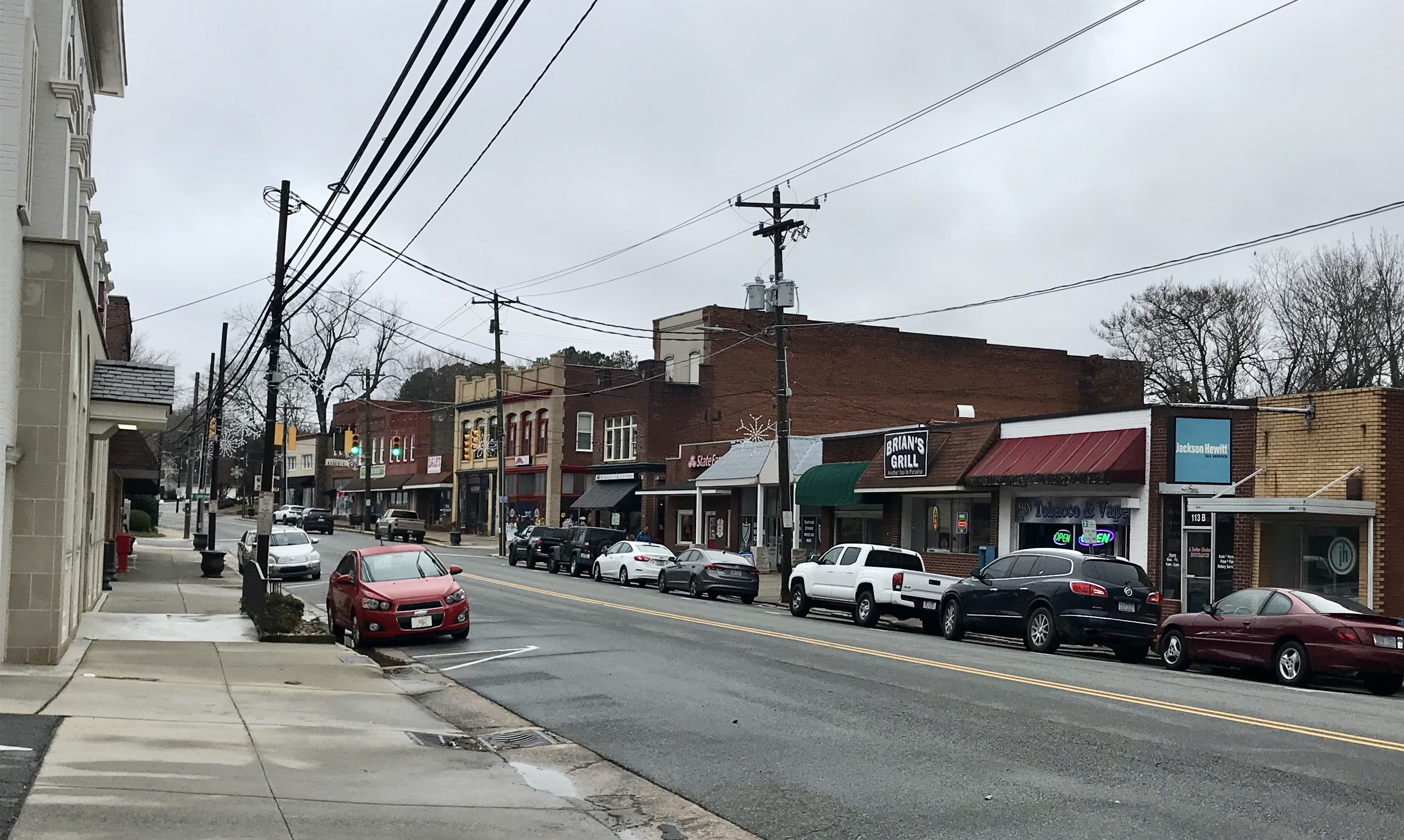
- Main Street

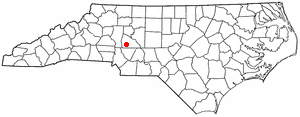
- Location of China Grove, North Carolina
- Coordinates: 35°34′17″N 80°34′36″W
- Country: United States
- State: North Carolina
- County: Rowan
- Named for: Grove of chinaberry trees

Area
  - Total: 4.08 sq mi (10.57 km^{2})
  - Land: 4.08 sq mi (10.57 km^{2})
  - Water: 0 sq mi (0.00 km^{2})
- Elevation: 824 ft (251 m)

Population (2020)
  - Total: 4,434
  - Density: 1,086.4/sq mi (419.46/km^{2})
- Time zone: UTC-5 (EST)
  - Summer (DST): UTC-4 (EDT)
- ZIP code: 28023
- Area code: 704
- FIPS code: 37-12480
- GNIS feature ID: 2406266
- Website: www.chinagrovenc.gov

China Grove is a town in Rowan County, North Carolina, United States. The population was 4,434 at the 2020 census. The town is located just north of Landis and south of Salisbury. It was one of the first towns in the United States to have Rural Free Mail Delivery.

The town was named for a grove of chinaberry trees planted near the town's rail depot.

== Geography ==
According to the United States Census Bureau, the town has a total area of 2.0 square miles (5.2 km^{2}), all of it land.

== Demographics ==
Historical population
| Census | Pop. | Note | %± |
|---|---|---|---|
| 1880 | 26 | | — |
| 1890 | 174 | | 569.2% |
| 1900 | 887 | | 409.8% |
| 1910 | 852 | | −3.9% |
| 1920 | 1,027 | | 20.5% |
| 1930 | 1,258 | | 22.5% |
| 1940 | 1,567 | | 24.6% |
| 1950 | 1,491 | | −4.9% |
| 1960 | 1,500 | | 0.6% |
| 1970 | 1,788 | | 19.2% |
| 1980 | 2,081 | | 16.4% |
| 1990 | 2,732 | | 31.3% |
| 2000 | 3,616 | | 32.4% |
| 2010 | 3,563 | | −1.5% |
| 2020 | 4,434 | | 24.4% |
U.S. Decennial Census

=== 2020 census ===
China Grove racial composition
| Race | Number | Percentage |
|---|---|---|
| White (non-Hispanic) | 3,312 | 74.7% |
| Black or African American (non-Hispanic) | 329 | 7.42% |
| Native American | 8 | 0.18% |
| Asian | 65 | 1.47% |
| Pacific Islander | 6 | 0.14% |
| Other/Mixed | 176 | 3.97% |
| Hispanic or Latino | 538 | 12.13% |

As of the 2020 census, there were 4,434 people, 1,696 households, and 927 families residing in the town.

The median age was 38.1 years. 22.5% of residents were under the age of 18 and 16.3% of residents were 65 years of age or older. For every 100 females, there were 92.6 males, and for every 100 females age 18 and over, there were 91.8 males age 18 and over.

99.0% of residents lived in urban areas, while 1.0% lived in rural areas.

Of occupied housing units, 34.0% had children under the age of 18 living in them. Of all households, 44.5% were married-couple households, 18.2% were households with a male householder and no spouse or partner present, and 28.7% were households with a female householder and no spouse or partner present. About 26.0% of all households were made up of individuals, and 10.5% had someone living alone who was 65 years of age or older.

There were 1,911 housing units, of which 7.3% were vacant. The homeowner vacancy rate was 1.8%, and the rental vacancy rate was 5.5%.

=== 2000 census ===
At the 2000 census there were 3,616 people in 1,388 households, including 999 families, in the city. The population density was 1,847.9 inhabitants per square mile (713.5/km^{2}). There were 1,466 housing units at an average density of 749.2/sq mi (289.3/km^{2}). The racial makeup of the town was 85.70% White, 6.97% African American, 0.28% Native American, 0.94% Asian, 0.14% Pacific Islander, 5.39% from other races, and 0.58% from two or more races. Hispanic or Latino of any race were 9.43%.

Of the 1,388 households 34.1% had children under the age of 18 living with them, 53.7% were married couples living together, 13.2% had a female householder with no husband present, and 28.0% were non-families. 24.9% of households were one person and 11.5% were one person aged 65 or older. The average household size was 2.58 and the average family size was 3.05.

The age distribution was 25.6% under the age of 18, 9.9% from 18 to 24, 29.9% from 25 to 44, 21.0% from 45 to 64, and 13.6% 65 or older. The median age was 35 years. For every 100 females there were 94.1 males. For every 100 females age 18 and over, there were 92.7 males.

The median household income was $36,580 and the median family income was $40,402. Males had a median income of $29,167 versus $21,932 for females. The per capita income for the town was $17,040. About 10.2% of families and 12.8% of the population were below the poverty line, including 18.2% of those under age 18 and 7.5% of those age 65 or over.

== Education ==
Most students in the town are served by the Rowan-Salisbury School System and primarily go to South Rowan High School, located in the town.

== Notable people ==
- Carey Hoyt Bostian, former Chancellor of North Carolina State University
- Gary Chapman, best-selling author of The Five Love Languages
- Jackie Fargo (a.k.a. Henry Faggart), former professional wrestler resided in China Grove. Fargo once led the careers of Jerry Lawler and The Fabulous Ones Stan Lane and Steve Keirn.
- Jack "Sonny Fargo" Faggart, professional wrestler.
- Jack Melchor, venture capitalist
- Curly Seckler, mandolin player with the Foggy Mountain Boys
- Dillon Stevens, actor and dancer best known for playing Michael in touring productions of Billy Elliot the Musical
- Wednesday 13, rock musician

== See also ==
- China Grove Township
