= Flip Benham =

American anti-abortion activist (born 1948)

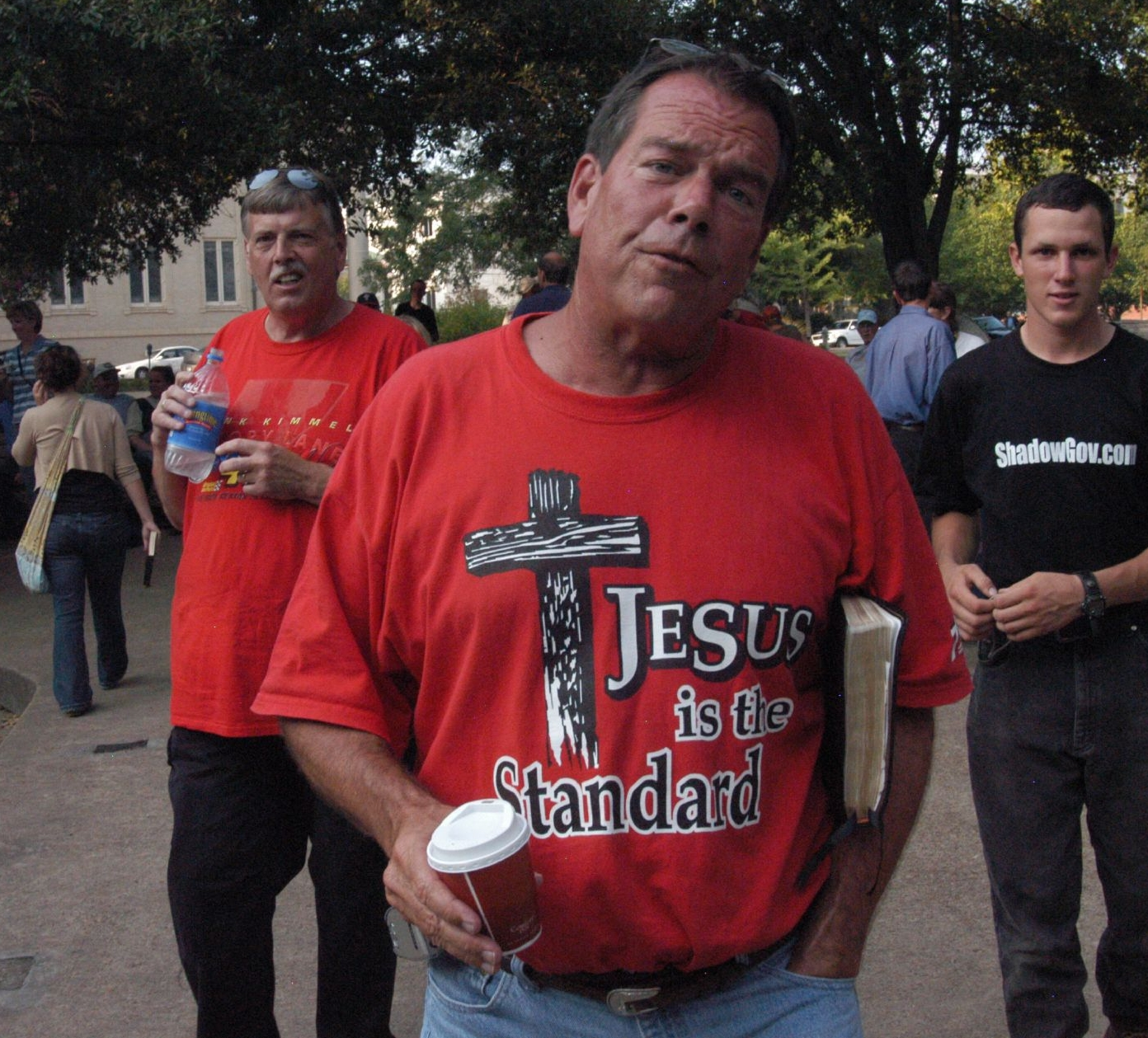
Phillip "Flip" Benham at an Operation Save America event in Jackson, Mississippi on July 21, 2006.

Philip "Flip" Benham (born April 16, 1948) is an Evangelical Christian minister and the national leader of Concord, North Carolina–based Operation Save America, an anti-abortion group that evolved from Operation Rescue.

== Protest activities ==
Benham has spoken out against hate crime legislation that would include legal protections for victims of anti-gay bias crimes, asserting the legislation "expressly forbids any language that might be perceived as 'hate' by the homosexual community. This makes illegal every word in the Bible."

In February 1998, Benham was sentenced to six months in jail for trespassing in Virginia after leading a demonstration outside E. C. Glass High School. He and a group of at least 150 Liberty University students carried graphic posters picturing aborted fetuses and told arriving students, including a busload of physically and mentally handicapped teenagers, that they were going to Hell if they did not save unborn children and convert to Christianity.

On August 6, 2010, Benham organized an anti-Islam protest at a Bridgeport, Connecticut mosque. About a dozen protesters confronted worshippers outside the mosque. Benham was speaking to the worshipers with a bullhorn. "This is a war in America and we are taking it to the mosques around the country," he said.

He has had various run-ins with the police. On July 1, 2011, a Charlotte, North Carolina jury found Benham guilty of stalking a Charlotte-area physician. Benham and his supporters took pictures of the doctor, his house, and the interior of his clinic, and later distributed photographs of the doctor captioned with "Wanted ... By Christ, to Stop Killing Babies". Benham was sentenced to 18 months probation and ordered to stay at least 500 feet from the victim.

On October 13, 2014, Benham staged a protest in Charlotte, North Carolina, outside the office of the Mecklenburg County Register of Deeds, where some of the first marriage licenses for same-sex couples were being issued, and while some of those couples were in the midst of wedding ceremonies nearby.

On January 23, 2018, police escorted Benham out of a meeting of the Charlotte-Mecklenburg school board after he violated protocol by approaching the board members at the dais, while shouting and pointing at board members, after his allotted time to address the board had expired.

On February 24, 2018, Benham was arrested in Charlotte and charged with communicating threats. The arrest happened during an anti-abortion protest. Nonprofit group Progress NC reported that Benham was arrested outside A Preferred Women’s Health Center, “despite a protective order warning him to stay away from a clinic volunteer.”

On August 18, 2025, Benham was found guilty by a North Carolina District Court Judge for having assaulted a female. He was ordered to serve 60 days in jail and not have any contact with members of the group Charlotte Choice. As of August 22, 2025, this judgment is pending appeal to North Carolina Superior Court.
