= Freedom High School (North Carolina) =

American public school in North Carolina

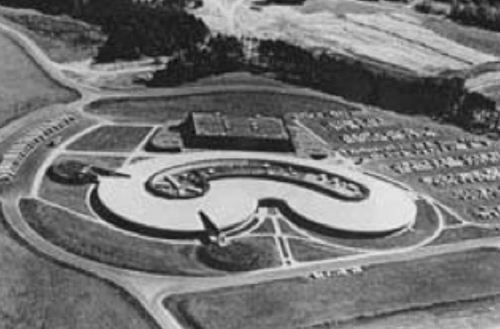

Location
- 511 Independence Blvd; Morganton, North Carolina 28655; United States
- 35°44′30″N 81°43′09″W

Information
- Type: Public
- Established: 1973 (53 years ago)
- School district: Burke County Public Schools
- CEEB code: 342745
- Principal: Shanda Epley
- Teaching staff: 74.64 (on an FTE basis)
- Grades: 9–12
- Enrollment: 1,374 (2023-2024)
- Student to teacher ratio: 18.41
- Colors: Red, white, and blue
- Nickname: Patriots
- Website: fhs.burke.k12.nc.us

Freedom High School is located in Morganton, North Carolina. It is a part of the Burke County Public Schools district.

== History ==
Freedom High School opened its doors for students in August 1973. The school formed from the consolidation of Morganton, Oak Hill, Glen Alpine and Salem High Schools.

The school initially had an open classroom floor plan (no walls between classes). There are now 'half walls' separating classes, so that one class can no longer see into another, though students are still able to hear other classes. The majority of academic classes are now taught in a separate, two-story building with full walls between each classroom.

== Student body demographics ==
U.S. News & World Report states that Freedom has a student body that is 47.5% minority and 48% economically disadvantaged. Freedom has 64 full time teachers for a student to teacher ratio of approximately 20:1. Freedom has a 90% graduation rate.

== Athletics ==
Freedom is a member of the North Carolina High School Athletic Association (NCHSAA) and are classified as a 6A school. The school is a part of the Northwestern 6A/7A Conference. Before losing enrollment with the opening of Robert L. Patton High School, Freedom competed as a 4A school (North Carolina's former highest classification for high school athletics) until 2009. The school colors are red, white and blue, and its team name is the Patriots.

Sports offered at Freedom include: football, soccer, cross country, basketball, swimming, archery, wrestling, baseball, tennis, track and field, volleyball and softball.

Freedom has won NCHSAA team state champions once each in 4A boys golf (1991), 4A volleyball (1999), and 3A girls golf (2021). The school has won five NCHSAA state championships in girls basketball (1989, 1994, 1995, 2002 and 2016) the first four of which were as a 4A school, while the last was as a 3A school. Freedom has also won four boys basketball NCHSAA state championships (1994, 1998, 2014 and 2020), with the first two as a 4A school and the last two in 3A.

Freedom has a large football stadium, with an estimated seating capacity of 10,000. Track and Field events are held in the stadium, but both men's and women's soccer and lacrosse matches are held at the Morganton soccer complex just across the Catawba river. Freedom also has a large gym for basketball, volleyball, and wrestling, with an estimated seating capacity of 2,500. In 2014, Freedom High was named an NCHSAA "Exemplary School" for its athletics and extracurricular activities.

Under the new NCHSAA classification system (8 classes) that began in the 2025–2026 school year, Freedom is classified as a 6A school.

== Notable alumni ==
- Donald Brown, former CFL player
- Warren Daniel, politician, served in the North Carolina State Senate
- Robert C. Ervin, North Carolina Superior Court judge
- Sam J. Ervin IV, lawyer and jurist who served on the North Carolina Supreme Court
- Kerri Gardin, former WNBA player
- Alfreda Gerald, singer
- Leon Johnson, former NFL running back and return specialist
- Paige Summers, model
