= Catawba Valley Athletic Conference =

The Catawba Valley Athletic Conference (CVAC) was a high school athletic conference in western North Carolina, United States. It was sanctioned by the North Carolina High School Athletic Association (NCHSAA). Listed below were conference members:

- Bandys
- Bunker Hill
- Draughn
- East Burke
- Maiden
- Newton-Conover
- South Iredell
- West Caldwell
