= Nikki Huffman =

- Born: June 7, 1987 (age 39); Connelly Springs, North Carolina, U.S.
- Education: Averett University; University of St. Augustine for Health Sciences
- Occupation: Baseball athletic trainer
- Organization: Toronto Blue Jays

Nikki Huffman (born June 7, 1987) is the former head athletic trainer for the Toronto Blue Jays in 2018 and 2019, and currently serves as a personal trainer for Marcus Stroman. She is only the second woman to be a head trainer in North America's top four sports leagues, after Sue Falsone.

== Early life and education ==
Huffman grew up in Connelly Springs, North Carolina. She watched Duke and Carolina basketball, college football, and NFL games with her dad on TV, which sparked an early interest in a career in sports. While attending East Burke High School, she decided she wanted to be an athletic trainer. She graduated in 2005.

She played basketball and lacrosse during her years at Averett University. She received her doctorate degree in physical therapy, with a focus on manual therapy, from the University of St. Augustine for Health Sciences.

== Career ==
After receiving her doctorate in physical therapy, Huffman was doing a residency and fellowship at Duke University's Michael W. Krzyzewski Human Performance Laboratory. In 2015, while at Duke, she helped Blue Jays' pitcher Marcus Stroman recover from a torn ACL, an injury that was supposed to end his season. Stroman credits Huffman with enabling him to return for the end of the season and the postseason. She worked with Stroman and teammate Aaron Sanchez in the 2015–16 offseason to prepare, which led her to connect with Blue Jays' training staff. In 2016, she joined the Blue Jays' staff as physical therapist and rehab coordinator.

In 2018, she took over as head athletic trainer, becoming the only woman currently a trainer, and only the second ever.

In 2020, she left the Blue Jays to become Stroman's personal trainer.
