= Paul Kiser =

American football player (born 1963)

No. 64
- Position: Offensive guard

Personal information
- Born: November 19, 1963 (age 62); Valdese, North Carolina, U.S.
- Listed height: 6 ft 4 in (1.93 m)
- Listed weight: 272 lb (123 kg)

Career information
- High school: East Burke (Connelly Springs, North Carolina)
- College: Wake Forest (1982–1986)
- NFL draft: 1987: 6th round, 153rd overall pick

Career history
- Atlanta Falcons (1987)*; Detroit Lions (1987)
- * Offseason or practice squad member only

Awards and highlights
- First-team All-American (1986); Jacobs Blocking Trophy (1986); First-team All-ACC (1986)

Career NFL statistics
- Games played: 1
- Stats at Pro Football Reference

Paul David Kiser (born January 20, 1963) is an American former professional football player who was a guard for the Detroit Lions of the National Football League (NFL). He played college football for the Wake Forest Demon Deacons, earning first-team All-ACC and first-team All-American selections in 1986, along with winning the Jacobs Blocking Trophy. In 2012, Kiser was inducted into the Wake Forest Sports Hall of Fame.
