= Tyler Shatley =

American football player (born 1991)

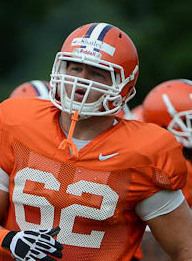
- Shatley with the Clemson Tigers in 2012

No. 69
- Position: Offensive guard

Personal information
- Born: May 5, 1991 (age 35); Valdese, North Carolina, U.S.
- Listed height: 6 ft 3 in (1.91 m)
- Listed weight: 305 lb (138 kg)

Career information
- High school: East Burke (Connelly Springs, North Carolina)
- College: Clemson (2009–2013)
- NFL draft: 2014: undrafted

Career history
- Jacksonville Jaguars (2014–2024)

Career NFL statistics
- Games played: 145
- Games started: 51
- Stats at Pro Football Reference

Christian Tyler Shatley (born May 5, 1991) is an American former professional football player who was a guard in the National Football League (NFL). He was signed as an undrafted free agent by the Jacksonville Jaguars after the 2014 NFL draft. He played college football for the Clemson Tigers.

== Early life ==
Shatley attended East Burke High School in Connelly Springs, North Carolina. While in high school he was a three-sport athlete in football, wrestling, and track. In football, he was selected to several all-star teams, and was the Northwestern Conference Player of the Year as a fullback, defensive lineman and punter. In wrestling, he was a three-time state placer and two-time state runner-up in the 4A 285-pound weight class. In track, he was a two-time 4A shot put state champion and multi-time state placer in the discus throw. Shatley was also honored as the 2008–09 NCHSAA Male Athlete of the Year.

== College career ==
Shatley played college football for the Clemson Tigers. He initially came to Clemson as a fullback but moved to the defensive line in 2010. He then moved to the offensive line in the spring of 2012 and was a starter at offensive guard in 2012 and 2013. Offensively, he had 60 knockdowns in 1,776 snaps over 25 games (25 starts) in his career. Defensively, he had 41 tackles, 1.5 tackles for loss, one sack, three quarterback pressures, and one pass breakup in 444 snaps over 26 games (two starts) in his career.

== Professional career ==
Pre-draft measurables
Height	Weight	Arm length	Hand span	40-yard dash	10-yard split	20-yard split	20-yard shuttle	Three-cone drill	Vertical jump	Broad jump	Bench press
6 ft 3 1/4 in (1.91 m)	300 lb (136 kg)	31 3/4 in (0.81 m)	10 in (0.25 m)	5.17 s	1.75 s	3.02 s	4.66 s	7.95 s	30.5 in (0.77 m)	9 ft 2 in (2.79 m)	40 reps
All values from Pro Day

Following the 2014 NFL draft, Shatley was signed by the Jacksonville Jaguars as an undrafted free agent. He made the team's 53-man roster on August 30, 2014.

On February 21, 2017, Shatley signed a one-year extension with the Jaguars. He played in all 16 games in 2017, starting four at center and right guard due to injuries. He also played as an emergency long snapper for the game-tying and game-winning field goals against the Chargers due to the injury of Matt Overton. The next day the Jaguars signed Colin Holba as the long snapper.

In 2018, Shatley started seven games at center following a season-ending injury to Brandon Linder.

On March 29, 2019, Shatley re-signed with the Jaguars. On March 27, 2020, Shatley re-signed with the Jaguars. He re-signed with the team again on March 15, 2021.

On February 28, 2022, Shatley signed a two-year contract extension with the Jaguars.

On April 19, 2024, Shatley re-signed with the Jaguars. He was released on August 27, 2024. He was re-signed to the practice squad on November 26.

On January 5, 2025, Shatley announced his retirement from the NFL following Jacksonville's 26–23 loss to the Indianapolis Colts in Week 18.
