= CVAC =

CVAC may refer to:

- Carolinas-Virginia Athletic Conference, abbreviation of the former name of the Conference Carolinas, a United States collegiate athletic conference of NCAA Division II
- Catawba Valley Athletic Conference, a United States high school athletic conference located in North Carolina
- CVac, a prospective therapeutic vaccine for ovarian cancer
- Cyclic Variations in Adaptive Conditioning, an alternative treatment for Adiposis dolorosa
