= Morganton Downtown Historic District =

Historic district in North Carolina, United States

- U.S. National Register of Historic Places
- U.S. Historic district
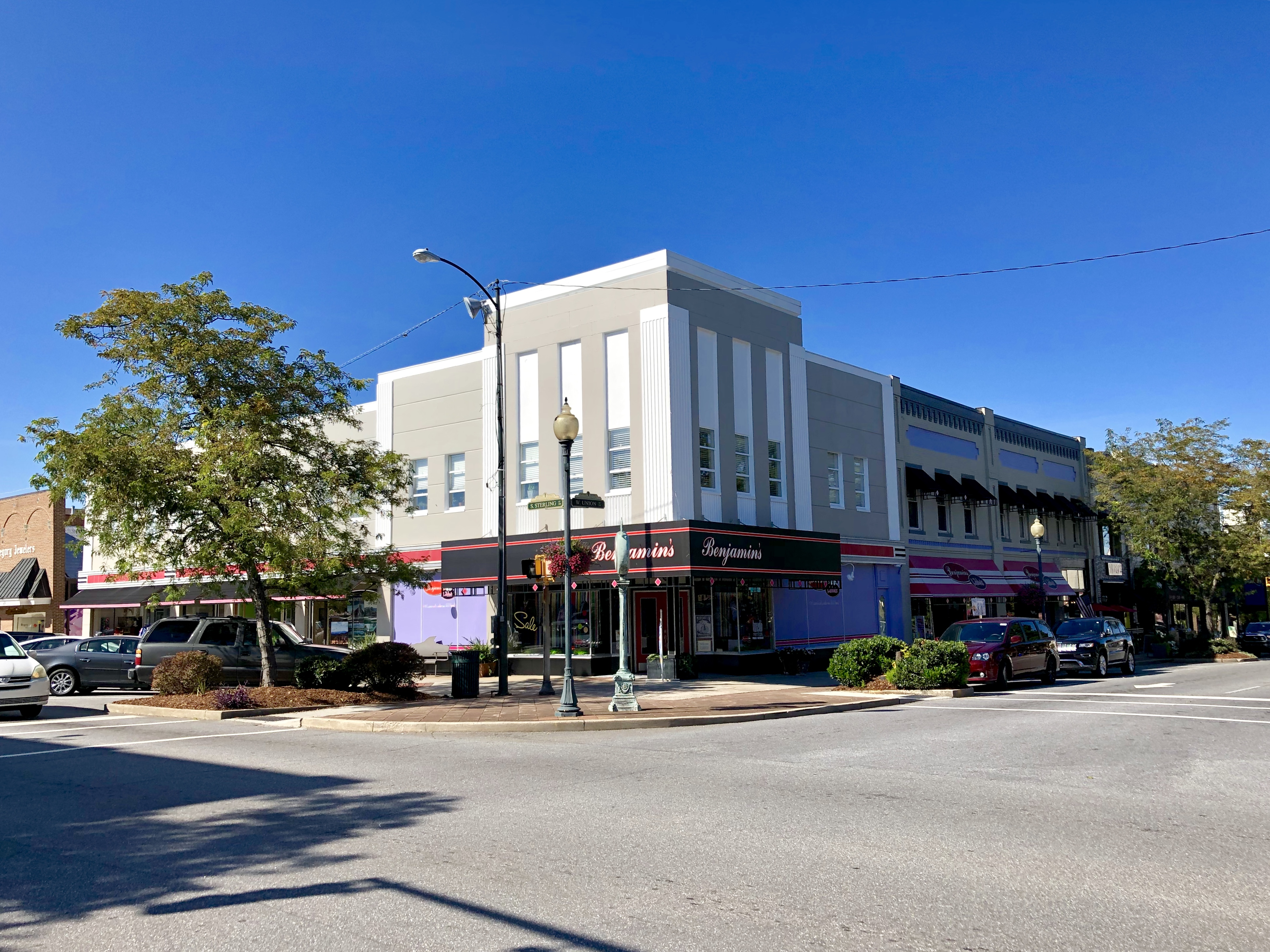
- Corner of Union Street and Sterling Street in the Historic District

- Location within North Carolina Location within the United States
- Location: E. Union, S. Green, N. & S. Sterling, King & Queen Sts., Morganton, North Carolina
- Coordinates: 35°44′45″N 81°41′16″W
- Area: 15 acres (6.1 ha)
- Architect: Multiple
- Architectural style: Classical Revival, Art Deco, Italianate
- MPS: Morganton MRA
- NRHP reference No.: 87001930
- Added to NRHP: November 9, 1987

Morganton Downtown Historic District is a national historic district located at Morganton, Burke County, North Carolina. It encompasses 62 contributing buildings in the central business district of Morganton. It includes commercial, industrial, and governmental buildings built between about 1889 and 1940. It includes representative examples of Classical Revival, Art Deco, and Italianate style architecture. Notable buildings include the Old Burke County Courthouse, Morganton Post Office, and the Morganton Community House.

It was listed on the National Register of Historic Places in 1987.
