= Burke County Courthouse (North Carolina) =

The current Burke County Courthouse is located at 201 South Green Street, Morganton, Burke County, North Carolina and operates as the courthouse for Burke County. It was opened in 1976 to replace the Old Burke County Courthouse. The old courthouse, in use by 1837, is listed on the National Register of Historic Places.

== Old Burke County Courthouse ==
- Old Burke County Courthouse
- U.S. National Register of Historic Places
- U.S. Historic district – Contributing property
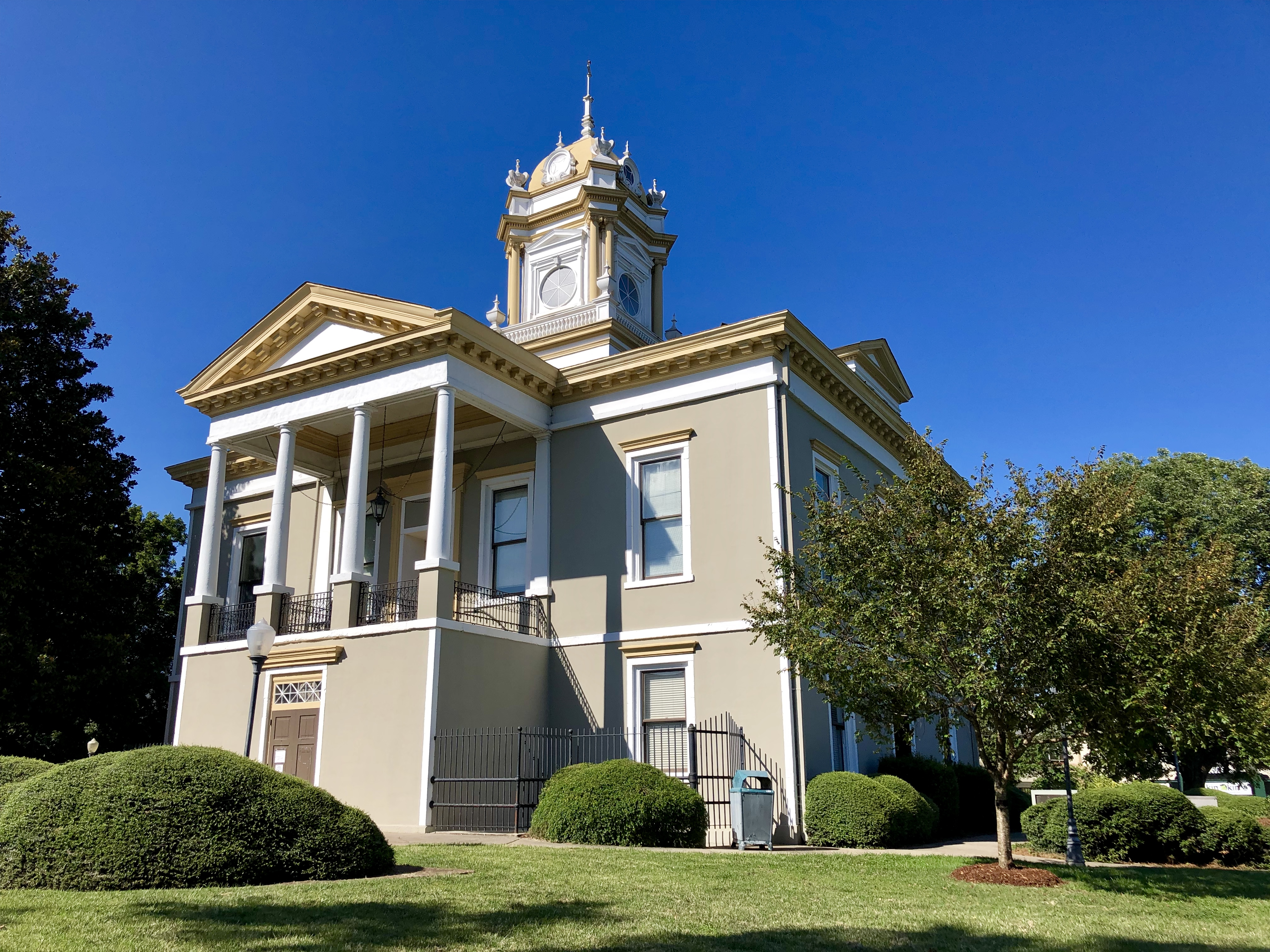
- Old Burke County Courthouse, August 2019

- Location within North Carolina Location within the United States
- Location: 102 E Union Street, Morganton, North Carolina
- Coordinates: 35°44′44″N 81°41′15″W
- Area: 3 acres (1.2 ha)
- Built: 1833-1835
- Architectural style: Classical Revival
- MPS: Morganton MRA
- NRHP reference No.: 70000443
- Added to NRHP: April 17, 1970

The Old Burke County Courthouse is the historic courthouse building located at 102 East Union Street in Morganton. It was built in 1833–1835 at cost of $15,000, and is a two-story, square stone building on a raised basement in the Classical Revival style. It features pedimented porticos on two sides and an elaborate cupola added during a remodeling in 1901.

Shortly before the end of the American Civil War a detachment of Union cavalry raided the building in April 1865, as part of Stoneman's 1865 Raid, and destroyed much of the county's records.

It was listed on the National Register of Historic Places in 1970. and is located in the Morganton Downtown Historic District.

== History ==
The Old Burke County Courthouse is the historic courthouse at 102 East Union Street on the courthouse lawn in the center of Morganton, North Carolina. It houses the old courtroom, used for lectures, meetings and events as well as the Heritage Museum and office of Historic Burke Foundation, Inc.

"In 1830, the Burke County Court of Pleas and Quarter Sessions decided that the County needed a new courthouse to replace the "shabby, weather-beaten" plank courthouse that had been built on the public square in 1791. The General Assembly of 1830-31 authorized it to spend $8,000 and named five commissioners to oversee the construction. In the 1832-33 sessions, the General Assembly increased the amount to $12,000.

James Binnie, a Scottish builder, was awarded the contract in 1833. He built the courthouse of native stone quarried on the Forney plantation about four miles north of Morganton. Frederick Roderick, a German stonemason who later established his home in Burke County, assisted Mr. Binnie with the construction. The building was put into use in 1837.

From 1847 until 1862, the North Carolina Supreme Court held its August session in the courthouse for the convenience of lawyers from the western part of the state who were arguing appeals from the Superior Courts of their respective counties.

In 1851, Morganton attorney and politician William Waightstill Avery shot and killed Samuel Fleming, a man with whom Avery had been in a dispute with over a lawsuit a few weeks earlier in another county, in the courthouse only a few feet away from the judge's bench (court was in recess). Avery was tried for murder but found not guilty by reason of temporary insanity.

During the Civil War, on April 17, 1865, Major General George Stoneman occupied the building and destroyed most of the county's records.

In 1885, the exterior of the building was covered with stucco, and in 1903, a major renovation designed by architect Frank Milburn of Columbia, SC raised the porticos and replaced the simple classical cupola with an elaborate one of Baroque style, giving the courthouse its present appearance.

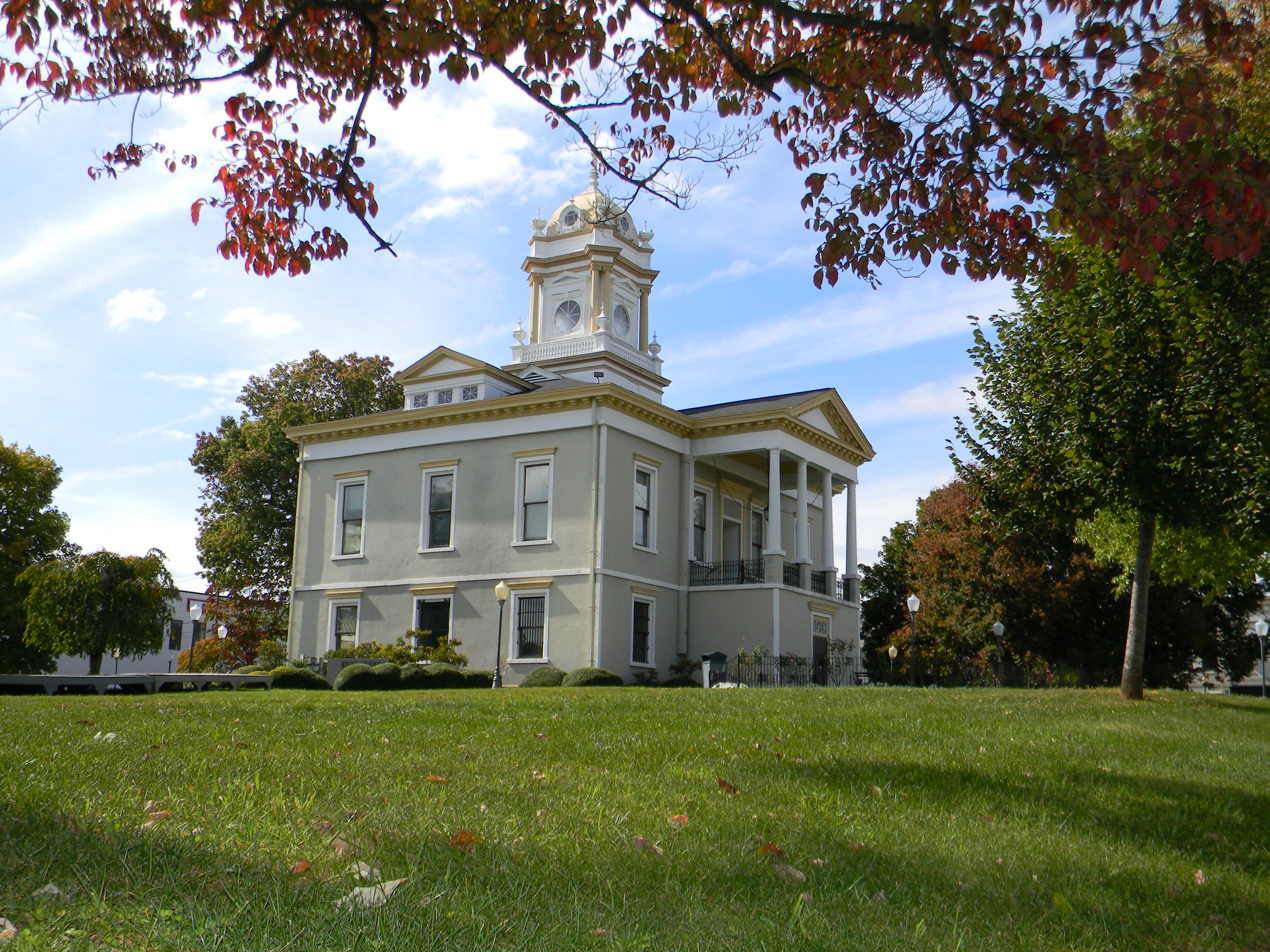
Burke County Courthouse in the fall, 2011

A monument to Burke County's Confederate Army troops was erected on the northwest corner of the Square in 1911 and was paid for by public subscription. The bronze statue of the soldier was added in 1918. The statue was a gift from Captain William Joseph Kincaid, a Burke County Confederate soldier, who settled in Griffin, Georgia after the war.

Also found on the Square is a memorial rose garden given in memory of Bob Byrd (1930–2001), a prominent Burke County attorney and a statue of Sam Ervin, a Burke County native, who served in the US Senate from 1954 to 1974.

The courthouse was in continuous use until 1976 when the present Burke County Courthouse was completed. The effort to preserve the Old Courthouse began in 1978. The restoration, completed in 1984, was accomplished with the joint efforts of Burke County, the City of Morganton, and Historic Burke Foundation.

The North Carolina Supreme Court met in the Old Chowan County Courthouse in Edenton in 2004, and again in 2013. In 2015, Governor McCrory signed Senate Bill 161 into law (S.L. 2015–89), allowing the court to meet in Morganton once again, "…the court shall meet in the Old Burke County Courthouse, the location of summer sessions of the Supreme Court from 1847-1862.""
