= Leon Johnson (running back) =

American football player (born 1974)

No. 32, 35
- Position: Running back

Personal information
- Born: July 13, 1974 (age 52); Morganton, North Carolina, U.S.
- Listed height: 6 ft 0 in (1.83 m)
- Listed weight: 222 lb (101 kg)

Career information
- High school: Freedom (Morganton)
- College: North Carolina (1993–1996)
- NFL draft: 1997: 4th round, 104th overall pick

Career history
- New York Jets (1997–2000); Chicago Bears (2001–2002); St. Louis Rams (2003)*; San Diego Chargers (2003–2004)
- * Offseason or practice squad member only

Awards and highlights
- PFWA All-Rookie Team (1997); First-team All-ACC (1996); 2× Second-team All-ACC (1993, 1994); ACC Rookie of the Year (1993)

Career NFL statistics
- Rushing yards: 799
- Rushing average: 3.7
- Receptions: 46
- Receiving yards: 489
- Return yards: 4,305
- Total touchdowns: 13
- Stats at Pro Football Reference

William Leon Johnson (born July 13, 1974) is an American former professional football player who was a running back in the National Football League (NFL). He played seven seasons in the NFL for the New York Jets, the Chicago Bears, and the San Diego Chargers.

== Early life ==
Johnson played quarterback on the football team at Freedom High School in Morganton, North Carolina. He also starred in track and field, winning the NCHSAA 4A state championship twice in the long jump, and played both basketball and baseball. Johnson moved to tailback at the University of North Carolina.

== College career ==
He played under Mack Brown in college at University of North Carolina. Johnson finished his college career with 3,693 rushing yards and 43 TD and added 1,288 yards receiving with 4 TD. He also scored two punt return TD's and a kick return TD.

- 1993: 179 carries for 1,012 yards with 14 TD. 29 catches for 233 yards with 2 TD
- 1994: 151 carries for 805 yards with 7 TD. 29 catches for 266 yards with 2 TD
- 1995: 225 carries for 963 yards with 12 TD. 54 catches for 408 yards
- 1996: 242 carries for 913 yards with 10 TD. 39 catches for 381 yards

Johnson was the only player in Atlantic Coast Conference history to be in the top five in career all-purpose yards, top five in career touchdowns, top five in career scoring, top 10 in career rushing yards and top 10 in career receptions. Johnson finished his college career being first in all-purpose yards in ACC history, and second in touchdowns. Johnson scored 50 touchdowns in his career, just one shy of the then all-time ACC record held by Ted Brown of NC State. Johnson scored 306 points total points at UNC, a school record for non-kickers. At the time, Johnson and Brown were the only two non-kickers to score 300 or more points in their college career.

== Professional career ==
Johnson was selected as the 104th overall pick in the 1997 NFL draft by the New York Jets. He was primarily used as a return specialist, returning both a kick return and punt return for touchdowns in his rookie season. He also would still be used as a running back. Johnson was the punt returner on the NFL's 1997 All-Rookie team. In 2001, he left the Jets in free agency and signed with the Chicago Bears. While with the Bears, he had his career high most rushing touchdowns in a season with 4, on only 20 total carries. In 2003, he signed with the San Diego Chargers where he played for one season and then retired.

== Personal life ==
Johnson is the father of one child, Jaylen.

In 2010, Johnson was inducted in the Burke County Sports Hall of Fame.
