= Southern Railway Freight Station =

Historic railway station in North Carolina, United States

- U.S. National Register of Historic Places
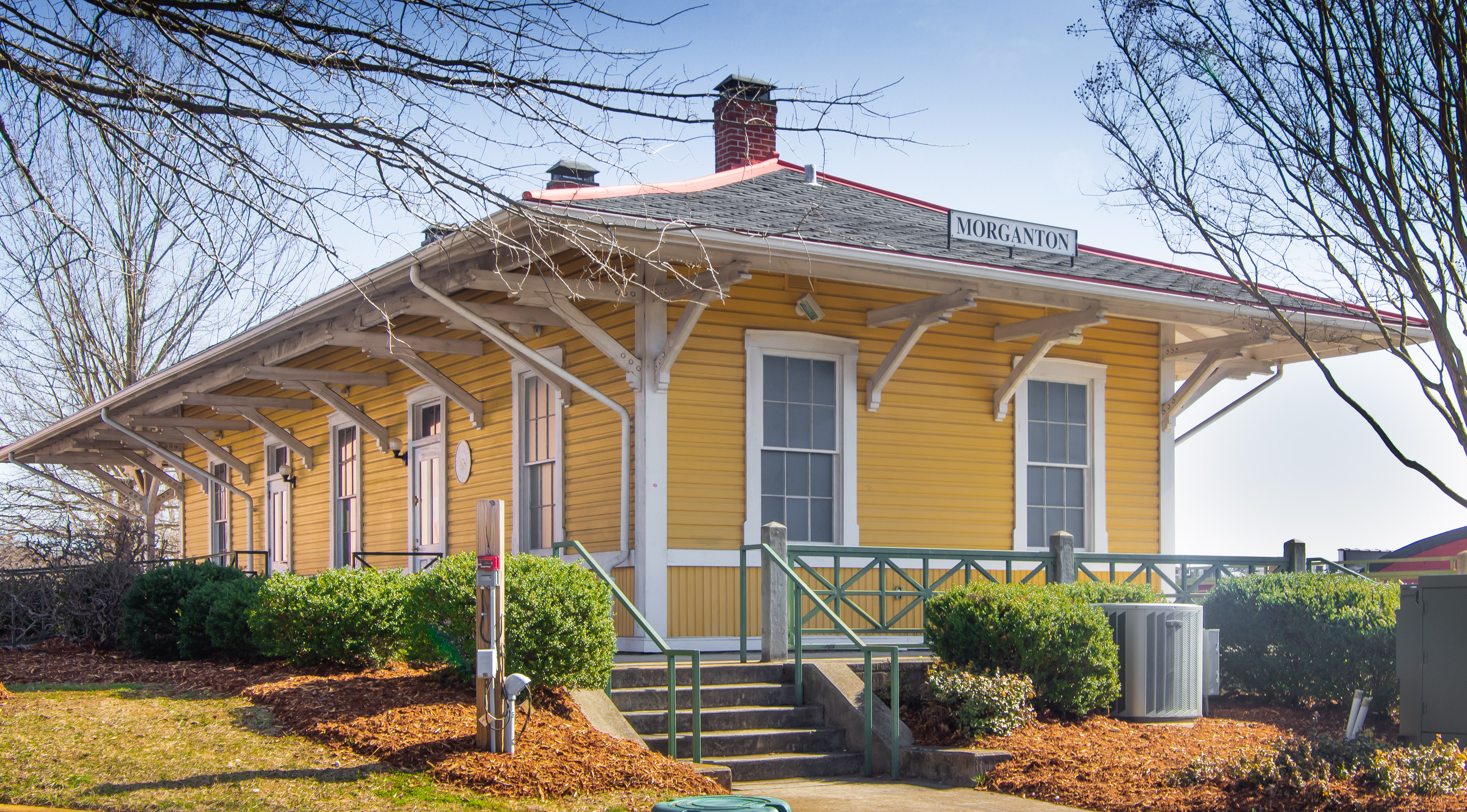
- Southern Railway Freight Station (March 5, 2021)

- Location within North Carolina Location within the United States
- Location: 630 South Green St., Morganton, North Carolina
- Coordinates: 35°44′30″N 81°40′56″W
- Area: 0.35 acres (0.14 ha)
- Built: c. 1929
- Architect: Unknown
- Architectural style: Colonial Revival architecture
- NRHP reference No.: 100005993
- Added to NRHP: December 29, 2020

Southern Railway Freight Station is a historic railway station located at Morganton, North Carolina. Built in 1929, it is listed on the National Register of Historic Places.

== History ==
In 1929, the one-story 4,750-sq.ft Southern Railway Freight Station was completed. It is the third freight station for Morganton, located to the east of the passenger depot, on the north side of the railroad track. The station catered textile and furniture industries located in the Piedmont Triad.

After the development of highways and private automobiles throughout the 20th-century, the use of the freight station diminished. Till 1970, the Freight Station's building was in use as a warehouse for Morganton Hardware. And by 1994, it was in used as a furniture warehouse.
