= 1986 All-Atlantic Coast Conference football team =

American college football all-star team

The 1986 All-Atlantic Coast Conference football team consists of American football players chosen by various selectors for their All-Atlantic Coast Conference ("ACC") teams for the 1986 college football season. Selectors in 1986 included the Associated Press (AP).

== Offensive selections ==
=== Wide receivers ===
- James Brim, Wake Forest (AP)
- Naz Worthen, NC State (AP)

=== Tackles ===
- Tim Morrison, Wake Forest (AP)
- Harris Barton, North Carolina (AP)

=== Guards ===
- Paul Kiser, Wake Forest (AP)
- John Phillips, Clemson (AP)

=== Centers ===
- John Davis, Georgia Tech (AP)

=== Tight ends ===
- Jim Riggs, Clemson (AP)

=== Quarterbacks ===
- Erik Kramer, NC State (AP)

=== Running backs ===
- Terrence Flagler, Clemson (AP)
- Derrick Fenner, North Carolina (AP)

== Defensive selections ==
=== Defensive linemen ===
- Kyle Ambrose, Georgia Tech (AP)
- Tim Goad, North Carolina (AP)
- Michael Dean Perry, Clemson (AP)
- Terence Mack, Clemson (AP)

=== Linebackers ===
- Mike Junkin, Duke (AP)
- Chuck Faucette, Maryland (AP)
- Pat Teague, NC State (AP)

=== Defensive backs ===
- Riccardo Ingram, Georgia Tech (AP)
- Keeta Covington, Maryland (AP)
- Delton Hall, Clemson (AP)
- Walter Bailey, North Carolina (AP)

== Special teams ==
=== Placekickers ===
- Mike Cofer, NC State (AP)

=== Punters ===
- Kelly Hollodick, NC State (AP)

== Key ==
AP = Associated Press

== See also ==
- 1986 College Football All-America Team
