= Donald Brown (Canadian football) =

American gridiron football player (born 1985)

Profile
- Position: Defensive back

Personal information
- Born: July 8, 1985 (age 41); Morganton, North Carolina, U.S.
- Listed height: 5 ft 9 in (1.75 m)
- Listed weight: 170 lb (77 kg)

Career information
- High school: Freedom (NC)
- College: Wingate

Career history
- 2008–2009: BC Lions
- 2010–2012: Winnipeg Blue Bombers
- 2013: Bloomington Edge
- Stats at CFL.ca (archive)

Donald Brown (born July 8, 1985) is an American former professional football player who was a defensive back in the Canadian Football League (CFL). He was signed as a free agent by the BC Lions in 2008 and was released during the 2009 BC Lions season training camp. Brown was later picked up by the Winnipeg Blue Bombers, playing from 2010 to 2012. He also played professionally for the Bloomington Edge of the Champions Professional Indoor Football League. Brown played college football at Wingate University.
