= Marcus Stroman =

American baseball player (born 1991)

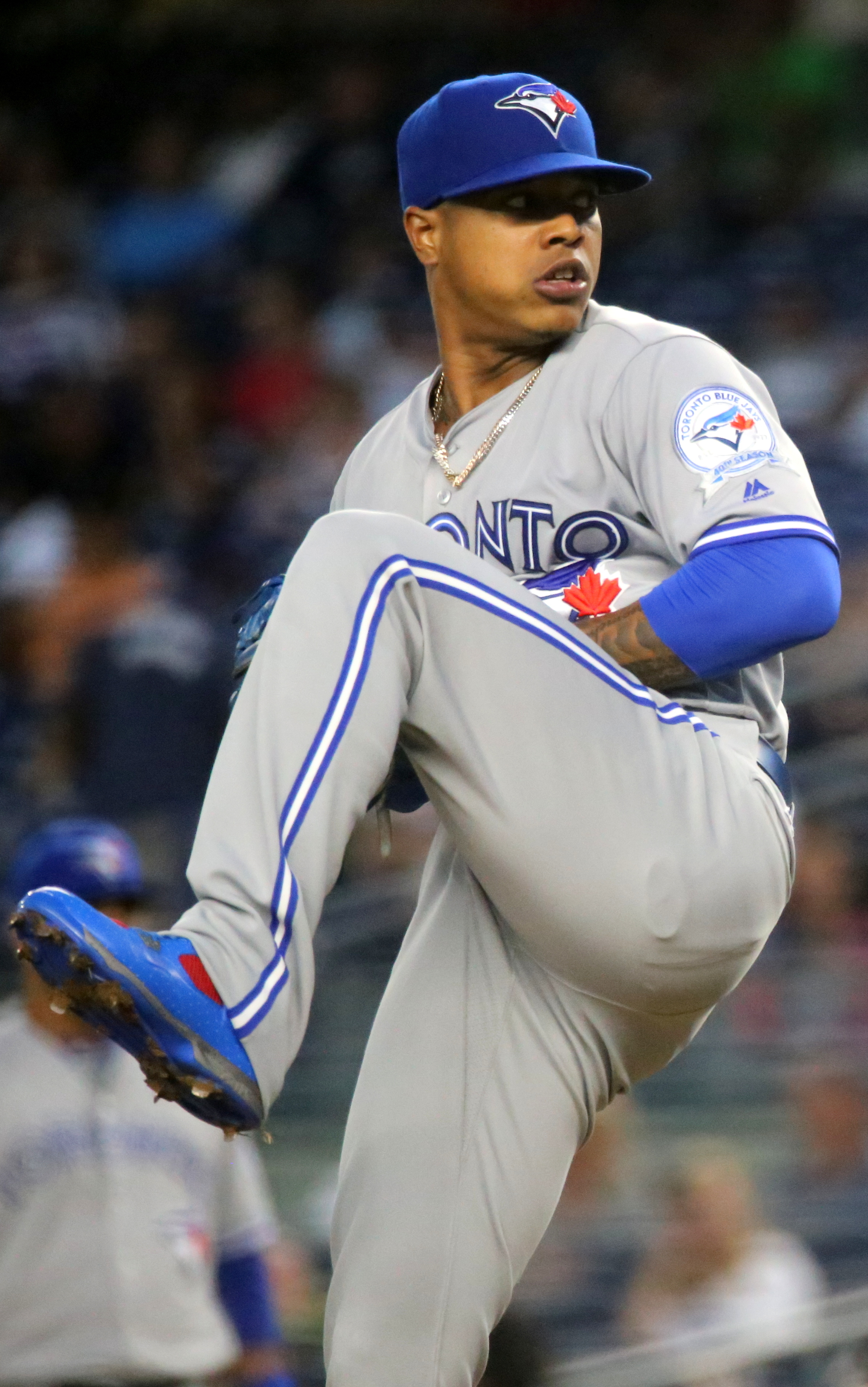
- Stroman with the Blue Jays in 2016

Free agent
- Pitcher
- Born: May 1, 1991 (age 35); Medford, New York, U.S.
- Bats: Right Throws: Right

MLB debut
- May 4, 2014, for the Toronto Blue Jays

MLB statistics (through 2025 season)
- Win–loss record: 90–87
- Earned run average: 3.79
- Strikeouts: 1,230
- Stats at Baseball Reference

Teams
- Toronto Blue Jays (2014–2019); New York Mets (2019, 2021); Chicago Cubs (2022–2023); New York Yankees (2024–2025)

Career highlights and awards
- MLB: 2× All-Star (2019, 2023); Gold Glove Award (2017); International: World Baseball Classic MVP (2017)
Medals
Men's baseball
Representing United States
World Baseball Classic
Gold medal – first place	2017 Los Angeles	Team

Marcus Earl Stroman (born May 1, 1991) is an American professional baseball pitcher who is a free agent. He has previously played in Major League Baseball (MLB) for the Toronto Blue Jays, New York Mets, Chicago Cubs, and New York Yankees. Stroman's height is listed at 5 feet 7 inches (1.70 m), making him one of only six pitchers shorter than 5 feet 10 inches (1.78 m) to make a start at the MLB level in the 21st century.

Stroman attended Duke University, and played college baseball for the Duke Blue Devils. He was drafted by the Blue Jays in the first round of the 2012 MLB draft. He made his MLB debut with the Blue Jays in 2014. He won a 2017 Gold Glove Award. Stroman was named an All-Star in 2019, and the Blue Jays traded him to the Mets later in the 2019 season. He signed a three-year contract for the Cubs prior to the 2022 season and opted out of his third year at the end of the 2023 season.

On the international level, Stroman has represented both the United States and Puerto Rican national teams. With the U.S. in 2017, he was named the World Baseball Classic MVP and was named to the All-World Baseball Classic Team.

== Early life ==
Stroman was born in Medford, New York, on May 1, 1991, to Earl Stroman and Adlin Auffant, who divorced when he was in the fifth grade. His mother is Puerto Rican, making him eligible to represent Puerto Rico in the World Baseball Classic. His father is a police detective in Suffolk County, New York. Stroman has a brother, Jayden, and sister, Sabria. His cousin, Erskine Kelley, played minor league baseball with the Pittsburgh Pirates and Chicago Cubs organizations.

In 1997, a six-year-old Stroman made an appearance on the Nickelodeon game show Figure It Out.

== Amateur career ==
Stroman attended Patchogue-Medford High School in Medford, where he enjoyed a high school rivalry with Steven Matz, a friend and future New York Mets teammate, who pitched for the nearby Ward Melville High School. Matz and Stroman were teammates on the same elite travel team, the Paveco Storm, for several years in junior high and high school. The two were roommates during the Area Code Games and pitched against each other several times in high school, including a notable game on April 16, 2009, which was attended by more than 50 scouts from every MLB team.

Stroman was drafted in the 18th round of the 2009 MLB draft (532nd overall) by the Washington Nationals. He opted not to sign, and instead entered Duke University, where he played college baseball for the Duke Blue Devils baseball team.

At Duke, Stroman compiled a career record of 15–13 in 48 appearances and set the Duke record for career strikeouts (290 over 222 innings pitched). He was also a position player for Duke, making 97 appearances, mostly at second base and shortstop. In 2010 and 2011, he played collegiate summer baseball for the Orleans Firebirds of the Cape Cod Baseball League (CCBL), allowed zero earned runs over 34 career innings with Orleans, was named a league all-star in 2010, and is a member of the CCBL Hall of Fame class of 2022.

On May 15, 2016, Stroman graduated from Duke University with a bachelor's degree in sociology.

== Professional career ==
=== Minor leagues ===
Billed by analysts as the most major league ready player available in the 2012 MLB draft, Stroman was drafted by the Blue Jays 22nd overall becoming the first Duke player ever selected in the first round. After starting his professional career with the Low-A Vancouver Canadians, the Blue Jays promoted Stroman to the Double-A New Hampshire Fisher Cats on August 1, 2012. Stroman was suspended for 50 games on August 28, 2012, for testing positive for methylhexanamine, a banned stimulant, which he claimed to unknowingly consume in an over the counter supplement.

Having completed his suspension, Stroman started and pitched five scoreless innings to get the win in the May 19, 2013, game for the Fisher Cats. On July 2, 2013, Stroman struck out 13 batters over 6 2/3 innings in a 3–1 loss to the New Britain Rock Cats. He was ranked as the number three prospect in the Blue Jays organization on July 26, 2013, when the revised Top 100 Prospects list was released.

Stroman attended the Blue Jays' 2014 major league spring training camp, and was assigned to the minor league camp on March 19. He was the 2014 Opening Day starting pitcher for the Triple-A Buffalo Bisons.

=== Toronto Blue Jays ===
==== 2014–2015 ====
Stroman was called up to the Blue Jays on May 3, 2014, after Brandon Morrow was transferred to the 60-day injured list. At the time of his call-up, he was considered the organization's number two prospect. He earned his first MLB victory on May 6, pitching 1 1/3 innings in relief of Drew Hutchison. Stroman was optioned back to Triple-A Buffalo on May 18, and was recalled on May 30 to make his first Major League start the following day. He pitched six innings and surrendered only one earned run on five hits, striking out six and issuing no walks to earn the win over the Kansas City Royals. On August 9, Stroman pitched nine innings for the first time in his career, but came away with a no-decision as the Blue Jays defeated the Detroit Tigers 3–2 in extra innings. He earned his first complete game and shutout on September 8, needing only 93 pitches to beat the Chicago Cubs 8–0. Stroman yielded only three hits, and at one point had retired 19 consecutive batters.

On September 17, Stroman was suspended six games and fined an undisclosed amount for intentionally throwing at Caleb Joseph during a game against the Baltimore Orioles. Immediately following the announcement, he filed an appeal of the suspension. On September 21, Stroman dropped his appeal, and MLB reduced his suspension to five games. It was announced shortly afterward that upon his return from the suspension, he would be moved to the bullpen for the remainder of the season. Stroman pitched four innings in relief of Drew Hutchison's final start of the season on September 26, and earned his first career save. He did not appear in the final two games of the Blue Jays season, and finished 2014 with an 11–6 record, 3.65 ERA, 111 strikeouts, and a 1.17 WHIP in 130 2/3 innings pitched.

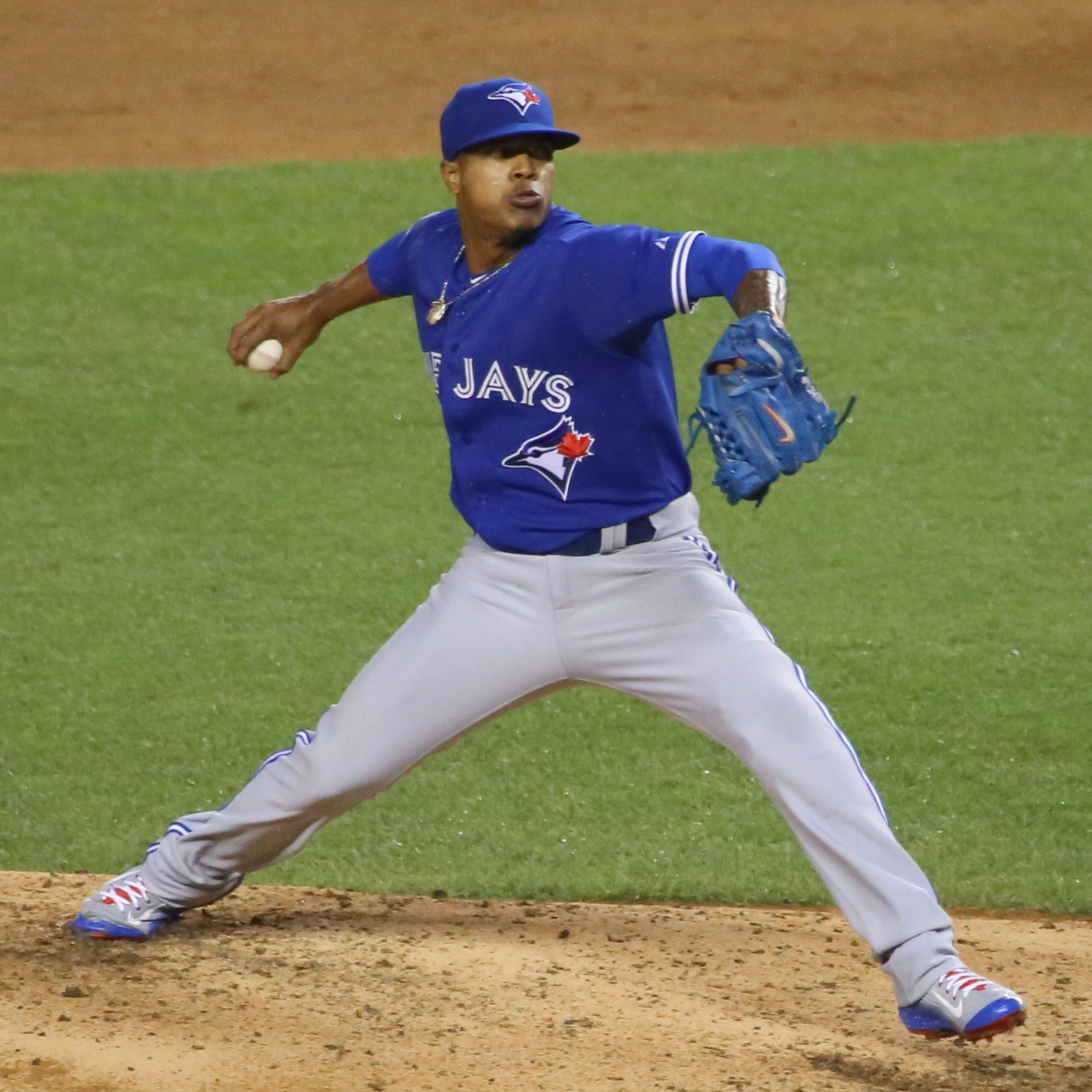
Stroman in his 2015 debut

On October 6, 2014, Stroman announced through his Twitter account that he would change his uniform number from 54 to 6 in honor of his grandmother. During 2015 spring training, Stroman suffered a torn anterior cruciate ligament in his left knee. He underwent a successful surgery, performed by Dr. James Andrews, to repair his ACL. Stroman was placed on the 60-day disabled list on April 5. While rehabbing from the injury, Stroman returned to Duke University to finish his degree, majoring in sociology with a minor in Markets and Management Studies.

On August 5, it was announced that Stroman would begin a rehab assignment later in the month. He threw off a mound for the first time following his injury on August 11, after receiving medical clearance the day prior. General Manager Alex Anthopoulos stated afterward that Stroman would be stretched out as a starter in his rehab. Stroman threw a 40-pitch simulated game on August 24, and a 51-pitch game on August 28. On September 2, he made his Class-A debut with the Lansing Lugnuts and pitched 4 2/3 innings, yielding no hits while walking one and striking out seven. He made his second and final rehab start on September 7, with the Buffalo Bisons. Manager John Gibbons confirmed on September 8 that Stroman would return as a starting pitcher, and make his 2015 debut against the New York Yankees on September 12. He was activated from the 60-day disabled list on September 11, and started the second game of a doubleheader the following day. Stroman pitched five innings and earned the win, yielding three runs before being removed due to a rain delay. He made three more starts, and finished the 2015 regular season with a 4–0 record, 1.67 ERA, and 18 strikeouts in 27 innings pitched.

Stroman played his first career postseason game in Game 2 of the 2015 American League Division Series against the Texas Rangers. He gave up three earned runs and struck out five, retiring 14 consecutive batters at one point. He pitched seven innings and received a no-decision in the loss. He started again in Game 5 of the same series, allowing six hits and two earned runs over six innings in an eventual 6–3 Blue Jays victory.

==== 2016–2017 ====
On March 23, 2016, Stroman was named the Opening Day starter for the Blue Jays. He pitched into the ninth inning, holding the Tampa Bay Rays to three runs on six hits, while striking out 5 in a 5–3 win. Stroman established a new career-high in strikeouts, with 9, in a 5–1 win over the Rays on May 1. He also set a Blue Jays franchise-record for strikeouts on a pitcher's birthday, surpassing David Price, Marc Rzepczynski, and Roy Halladay, who each had 8 strikeouts in starts on their birthdays. Stroman improved on his single-game strikeout record on August 1, when he struck out 13 Houston Astros batters in a no-decision. He finished the 2016 regular season with a 9–10 record, 4.37 ERA, and 166 strikeouts over a career-high 204 innings pitched. He had the highest ground ball percentage among major league pitchers (60.1%), and the lowest fly ball percentage (20.4%).

On October 3, the Blue Jays announced that Stroman would start the Wild Card game against the Baltimore Orioles the following day. He pitched a full six innings, giving up just two earned runs and striking out six, as the Blue Jays won the game 5–2 in extra innings and advanced to the 2016 American League Division Series to play the Texas Rangers. Stroman was scheduled to start the fourth game of the ALDS against the Rangers; however, the Blue Jays swept Texas and advanced to play the Cleveland Indians in the American League Championship Series. Stroman pitched 5 1/3 innings and yielded four earned runs in Game 3 of the ALCS, his lone start of the series.

On February 14, 2017, it was announced that Stroman had won his arbitration case and would receive a $3.4 million salary for the 2017 season. In a 6–5 win over the St. Louis Cardinals on April 25, Stroman recorded the first hit of his career. His double to left field was the first ever pinch hit by a Blue Jays pitcher, and also the first extra-base pinch hit by an American League pitcher since Gary Peters in 1971. Stroman hit an opposite field home run off Julio Teherán in the Blue Jays 9–0 win over the Atlanta Braves on May 18, 2017. In doing so, Stroman became just the second Blue Jays pitcher to hit a home run, joining Mark Hendrickson, who did so on June 21, 2003. Stroman's home run followed Luke Maile's solo shot, making the batterymates the first to hit back-to-back home runs since 1970. He also became the first pitcher listed 5 feet 8 inches (1.73 m) or shorter to hit a home run in the majors since Tom Phoebus of the Baltimore Orioles did so in 1968. On July 3, Stroman left a game against the New York Yankees after five innings when a blister developed on his right middle finger, though the injury did not cause him to miss a start. Stroman was hit on the right elbow by a line drive in Toronto's 7–2 win over the Baltimore Orioles on September 2, and was forced to leave the game, though he was once again able to make his next start.

Stroman finished the 2017 season with 13 wins, 164 strikeouts, and a 3.09 ERA in 201 innings. By passing the 200-inning mark, he became the seventh Blue Jays pitcher in the prior 20 years to have consecutive 200-inning seasons. He again had the highest ground ball percentage among major league pitchers (62.1%), and the lowest fly ball percentage (19.7%).

On October 28, Stroman was named a finalist for the American League pitcher's Gold Glove Award, along with Alex Cobb and Chris Sale. Stroman won the award on November 7. The Toronto chapter of the Baseball Writers' Association of America unanimously voted Stroman the Blue Jays' Pitcher of the Year for 2017.

==== 2018–2019 ====
On February 15, 2018, Stroman announced through his Twitter account that he had lost his arbitration case and would make $6.5 million for the season instead of his requested salary of $6.9 million. Stroman struggled to start the 2018 season, going 0–5 with a 7.71 ERA before being placed on the 10-day disabled list due to right shoulder fatigue on May 11. On June 13, he made his High-A debut with the Dunedin Blue Jays and pitched 4 1/3 innings in a rehab start, surrendering two runs on one hit while walking four and striking out three. Stroman returned to Toronto's rotation on June 23, pitching five shutout innings against the Los Angeles Angels. Later in the season, Stroman was forced to leave starts on August 7 and 17 against the Boston Red Sox and New York Yankees, respectively due to blisters in his pitching hand. He would return again on September 3 to start against the Tampa Bay Rays, however, blisters again forced him out of the game. Stroman would not return again in 2018 after this start, ending his 2018 season with a 4–9 record and a 5.54 ERA in 19 starts. On March 13, 2019, Stroman was announced as the Opening Day starter by Blue Jays manager Charlie Montoyo. On June 30, Stroman was named to the 2019 MLB All-Star Game, his first all-star nomination of his career.

=== New York Mets ===
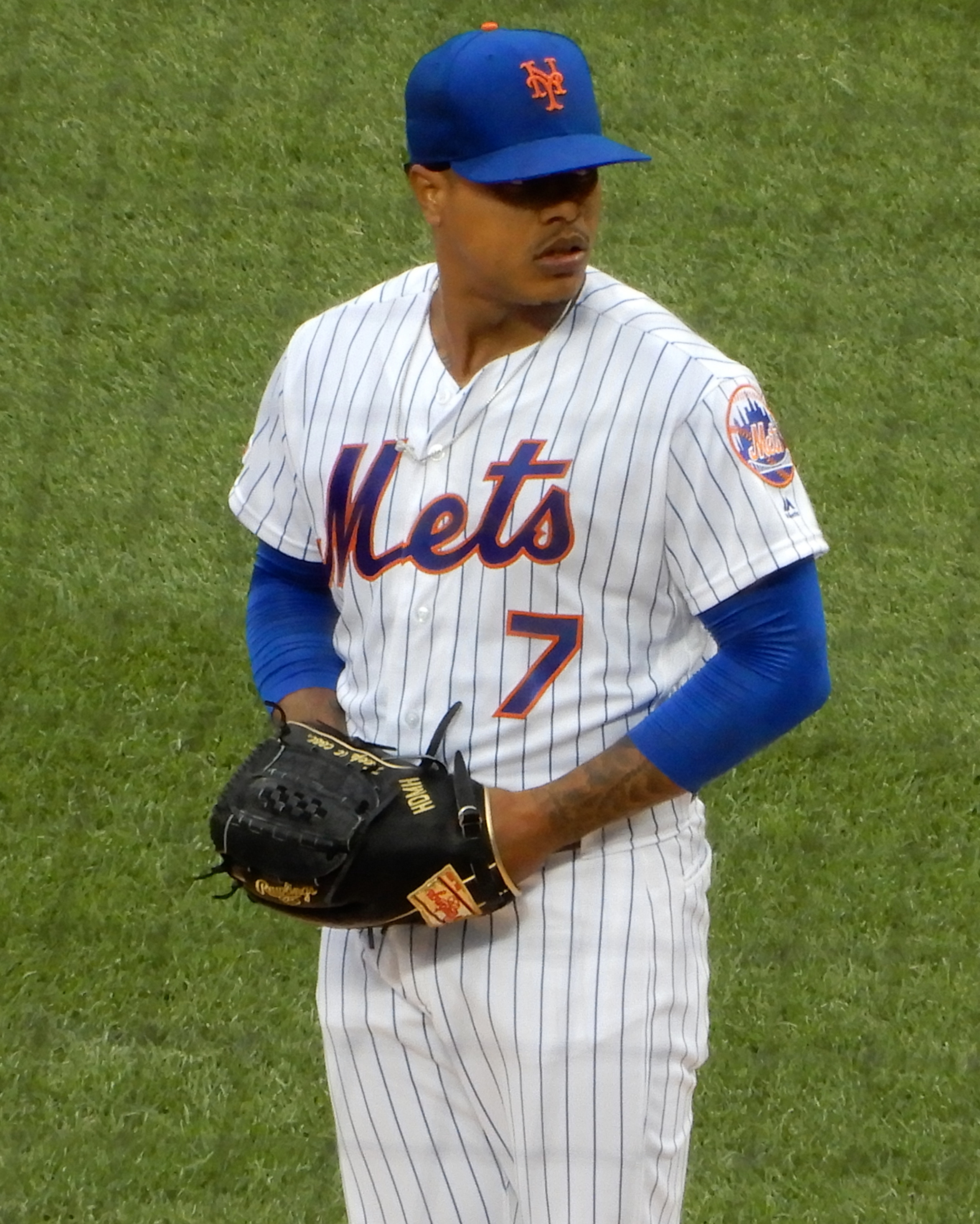
Stroman pitching in 2019

On July 28, 2019, the Toronto Blue Jays traded Stroman (along with cash considerations) to the New York Mets for pitching prospects Anthony Kay and Simeon Woods Richardson. In 11 starts with the Mets in 2019, Stroman was 4–2 with a 3.77 ERA and 60 strikeouts. He finished 10–13 with a 3.22 ERA overall between the Blue Jays & Mets.

On November 15, 2019, Stroman announced via Twitter he was switching to number 0 for the 2020 season and also changed his Twitter handle to @STR0. Earlier in the offseason, he stated he wanted to give up No. 7 in honor of Jose Reyes. That offseason, he also hired Nikki Huffman as his personal trainer, away from the Toronto Blue Jays where she served as head trainer. He first met her in 2015 at Duke University where she helped him recover from a torn ACL ahead of schedule. Stroman missed the beginning of the 2020 season with a torn left calf muscle. On August 10, 2020, before his return, he announced he would opt out of the season.

After the 2020 season, the Mets extended a qualifying offer to Stroman worth $18.9 million for the 2021 season. Stroman accepted the qualifying offer on November 11.

In 2021, Stroman led the Mets' starting rotation with 10 wins, 158 strikeouts and 179 innings pitched.

=== Chicago Cubs ===
On December 1, 2021, Stroman signed a two-year contract (with a player option for a third year) worth $71 million to play for the Chicago Cubs. He is the first ever Cub to wear the uniform number 0. He started for the Cubs on Opening Day for the 2023 season and became the first pitcher to be called in violation of the pitch clock.

Stroman was named to the 2023 MLB All-Star Game, but opted not to play in the game in order to rest. In August, the Cubs put Stroman on the injured list due to inflammation in his right hip. In mid-August, he was diagnosed with a rib cage cartilage fracture. He returned to the Cubs in mid-September. After the 2023 season, Stroman declined his player option for the 2024 season and became a free agent.

=== New York Yankees ===
On January 17, 2024, Stroman signed a two-year, $37 million contract with the New York Yankees including a conditional player option for the 2026 season that would have vested at $18 million if Stroman had pitched 140 innings in 2025. Across 29 starts and one relief appearance, Stroman pitched to a 4.31 ERA with 113 strikeouts in 154 2/3 innings. However, with a 5.70 ERA since the start of June, Stroman was ultimately left off the Yankees' ALDS 26-man roster. After the Yankees advanced, he was readded to their 26-man roster for the ALCS.

On August 1, 2025, Stroman was released by the Yankees. During the Yankees 2025 season, he started nine games, pitched 39 innings and logged a 6.23 ERA and 3–2 record with 26 strikeouts over 39 innings.

== International career ==
In December 2016, Stroman announced that he would play for the United States national baseball team at the 2017 World Baseball Classic. He made three starts for the team, and posted a 2.35 ERA in 15 1/3 total innings. In the final game, Stroman held Team Puerto Rico scoreless and without a hit through six innings, leading Team USA to an 8–0 victory and their first WBC championship. Following the game, Stroman was named the tournament's most valuable player (MVP). He was also named to the All-World Baseball Classic team. He represented the Puerto Rico national baseball team at the 2023 World Baseball Classic.

== Pitching style ==
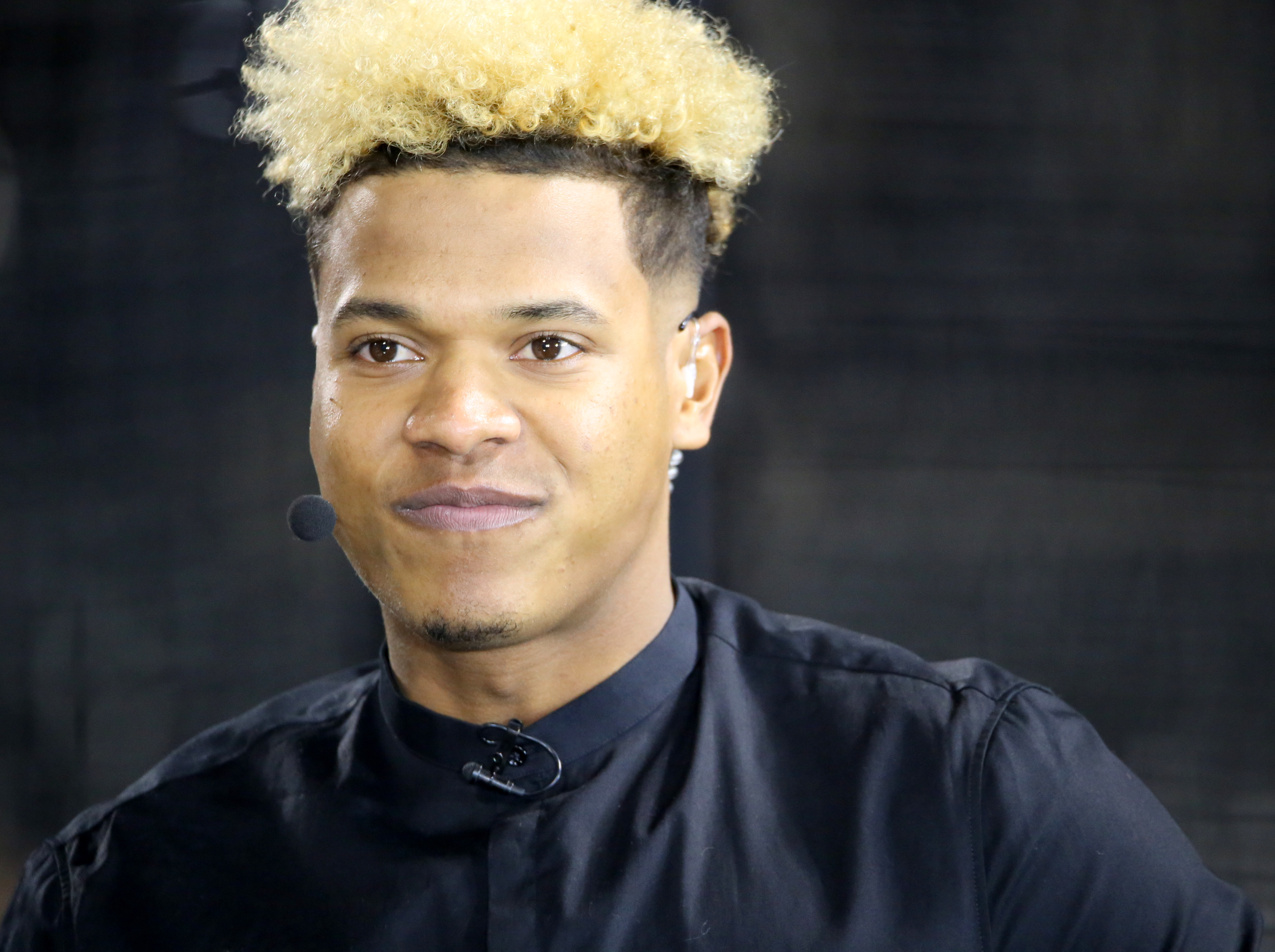
Stroman on the MLB Network during the 2015 MLB postseason

Stroman's repertoire includes six pitches: his four-seam fastball and two-seam fastball average 93 miles per hour (150 km/h) and 92 miles per hour (148 km/h) respectively. His off-speed pitches include a curveball at 82 miles per hour (132 km/h), a changeup at 85 miles per hour (137 km/h), a cutter at 90 miles per hour (140 km/h), and a slider at 85 miles per hour (137 km/h). He has relied more on his two-seam fastball (about 41–44%) since the 2015 season.

== Personal life ==
Stroman has several tattoos, including a large tribute on his left shoulder to his grandmother, Gloria Major, who would regularly attend his high school games and died while he was attending Duke University. His other tattoos include the area code 631, portraits of his parents, a Gold Glove Award, the Air Jordan logo, a quote from Mark 9, a quote from Martin Luther King Jr., the flag of Puerto Rico, his mother's eye, the Major League Baseball logo with the date of his MLB debut, the date of his 2015 knee surgery, a portrait of Rihanna, Cillian Murphy's character from Peaky Blinders, Denzel Washington's character from Training Day, himself swinging a bat in a Blue Jays uniform, the skyline of Toronto, the head of a lion, his father's police badge, his own initials, an orchid, a poker chip, the number 6, a silhouetted airplane, and a wine glass as well as "God bless me," "God save me" and "family" in Spanish and the words "blessed," "mamma's boy," "daddy's gift," "dreamchaser," "BElieve in YOUrself," "smile," "mom," "dad," "height doesn't measure heart" and "breaking stereotypes."

On January 9, 2015, Stroman completed the legal process for trademarking "Height Doesn't Measure Heart" and "HDMH". Since mid-2015, he has produced caps with New Era that feature his trademarks. He has also partnered with Nike, Jordan Brand, BioSteel, and Rogers to create apparel featuring the HDMH logo. Stroman stated in December 2016 that he measured exactly 5 feet 7.25 inches (1.7082 m) for a physical examination for Nike.

Stroman appeared on the remix of the title track of rapper Mike Stud's 2016 album These Days. Stroman has also appeared in concert with Stud, who was his teammate at Duke.

Stroman is also an avid wine enthusiast. A personal wine cellar was constructed in his Tampa home, and is estimated to contain over 400 bottles of wine.

Stroman says "I am very big into Transcendental Meditation".

Sporting positions
Preceded by Drew Hutchison; J. A. Happ	Opening Day starting pitcher for the Toronto Blue Jays; 2016; 2019	Succeeded by Marco Estrada; Hyun-jin Ryu
