= East Burke High School =

American public school in North Carolina

Location
- 3695 E Burke Blvd; Connelly Springs, North Carolina 28612; United States; 35°43′19″N 81°28′54″W

Information
- School type: Public
- Established: 1974 (52 years ago)
- School district: Burke County Public Schools
- Principal: Katie Moore
- Staff: 37.80 (FTE)
- Grades: 9–12
- Enrollment: 874 (2024-2025)
- Student to teacher ratio: 23.12
- Colors: Navy, columbia blue, and gray
- Nickname: Cavaliers
- Website: ebhs.burke.k12.nc.us

East Burke High School (EBHS) is a public high school in Connelly Springs, North Carolina. It is a part of the Burke County Public Schools district.

== History ==
East Burke High School opened its door for students in August 1974. The school absorbed the student bodies of what had been four separate high schools in the eastern half of Burke county: Hildebran, George Hildebrand, Valdese, and Drexel.

== Athletics ==
East Burke is a member of the North Carolina High School Athletic Association (NCHSAA) and are currently classified as a 4A school. The school is a part of the Western Piedmont 3A/4A Conference. East Burke's school colors are navy, columbia blue, and gray, and its team name is the Cavaliers. Sports at East Burke include:

- Baseball
- Basketball
- Cross Country
- Football
- Golf
- Soccer
- Softball
- Swimming
- Tennis
- Indoor/Outdoor Track and Field
- Volleyball
- Wrestling

== Notable alumni ==
- Nikki Huffman, served as head athletic trainer for the Toronto Blue Jays in 2018 and 2019
- Paul Kiser, former NFL offensive lineman for the Detroit Lions
- Tyler Shatley, former NFL offensive lineman from 2014 to 2024 for the Jacksonville Jaguars
- Drew Van Horn, college president and administrator
