= Jimmy C. Draughn High School =

American public school in North Carolina

Location
- 709 Lovelady Rd NE; Valdese, North Carolina 28690; United States
- 35°46′01″N 81°32′47″W

Information
- School type: Public
- Established: 2008 (18 years ago)
- School district: Burke County Public Schools
- Principal: Charles Williams
- Staff: 34.92 (FTE)
- Grades: 9–12
- Enrollment: 656 (2023-2024)
- Student to teacher ratio: 18.79
- Colors: Old gold, black, and white
- Nickname: Wildcats
- Website: dhs.burke.k12.nc.us

Jimmy C. Draughn High School (commonly known as Draughn High School) is a public high school in Valdese, North Carolina. It is a part of the Burke County Public Schools district.

== History ==
Jimmy C. Draughn High School opened in August 2008. The school was named for long-time educator and principal Jimmy C. Draughn (1934–1999). Draughn also served as mayor of Valdese. The school shares the same design as Robert Logan Patton High School in Morganton, North Carolina, which opened a year earlier in 2007.

== Athletics ==
Draughn is a member of the North Carolina High School Athletic Association (NCHSAA) and are classified as a 3A school. The school is a part of the Western Piedmont 3A/4A Conference. Draughn's school colors are old gold, black, and white, and its team name is the Wildcats. Sports at Draughn include:

- Baseball
- Basketball
- Cross Country
- Football
- Golf
- Soccer
- Softball
- Swimming
- Tennis
- Indoor/Outdoor Track and Field
- Volleyball
- Wrestling
