= Morganton, North Carolina =

- City
- Morganton Downtown Historic District

- Flag Seal

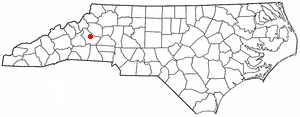
- Location within the state of North Carolina
- Coordinates: 35°44′27″N 81°42′01″W
- Country: United States
- State: North Carolina
- County: Burke
- Founded: 1777
- Incorporated: 1784
- Named for: Daniel Morgan

Government
  - Mayor: Ronnie Thompson

Area
  - Total: 19.24 sq mi (49.84 km^{2})
  - Land: 19.24 sq mi (49.84 km^{2})
  - Water: 0 sq mi (0.00 km^{2})
- Elevation: 1,175 ft (358 m)

Population (2020)
  - Total: 17,474
  - Density: 908.0/sq mi (350.59/km^{2})
- Time zone: UTC−5 (Eastern)
  - Summer (DST): UTC−4 (Eastern)
- ZIP Codes: 28655, 28680
- Area code: 828
- FIPS code: 37-44400
- GNIS feature ID: 2404304
- Website: www.morgantonnc.gov

Morganton is a city in and the county seat of Burke County, North Carolina, United States. It is located in the foothills of the Blue Ridge Mountains along the Catawba River.

The population was 17,474 at the 2020 census. Morganton is approximately 75 miles (121 km) northwest of Charlotte and 57 miles (92 km) east of Asheville. It is one of the principal cities in the Hickory-Lenoir-Morganton, NC Metropolitan Statistical Area.

== History ==
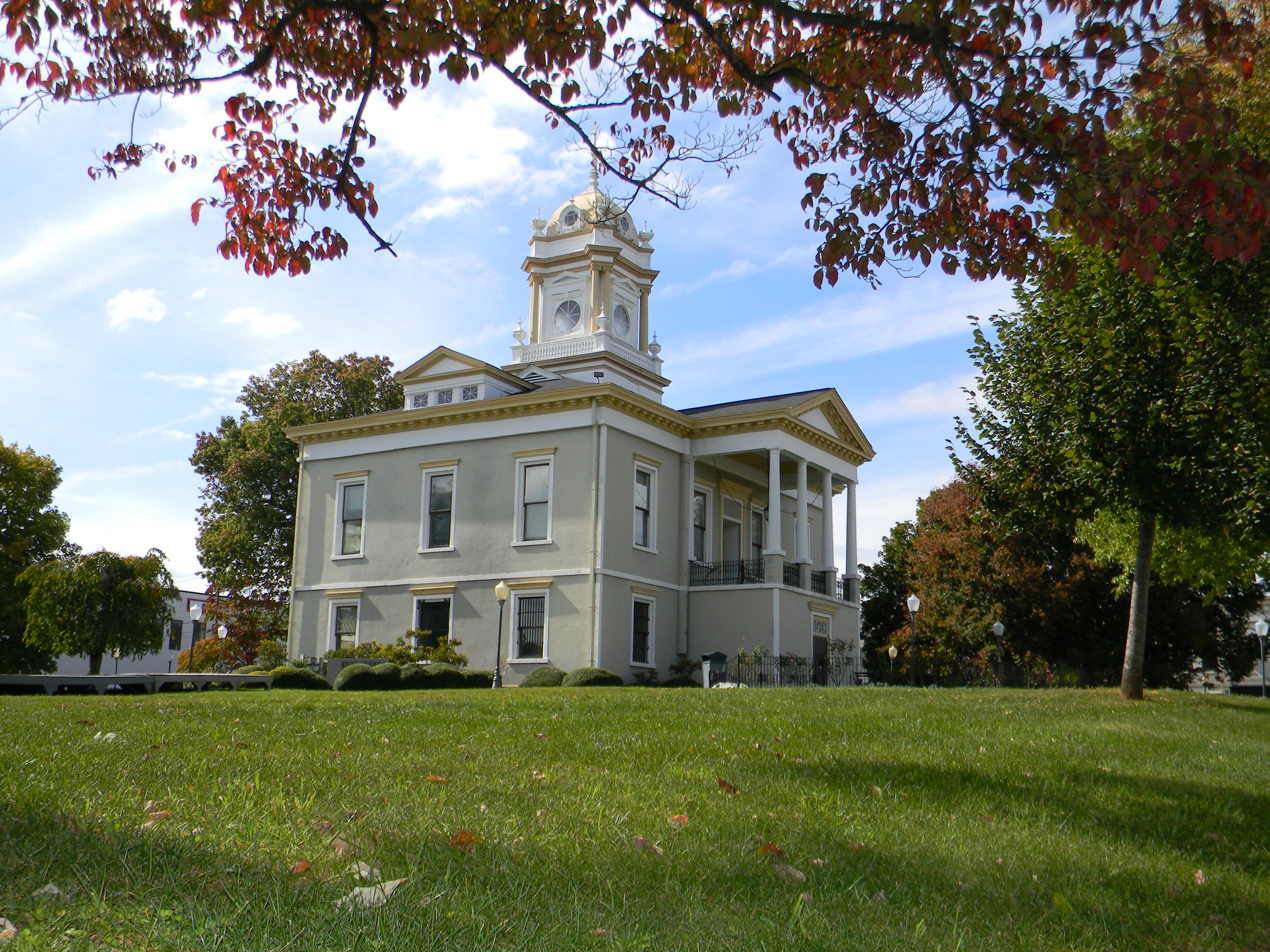
Old Burke County Courthouse (1833-1835; cupola added 1901)

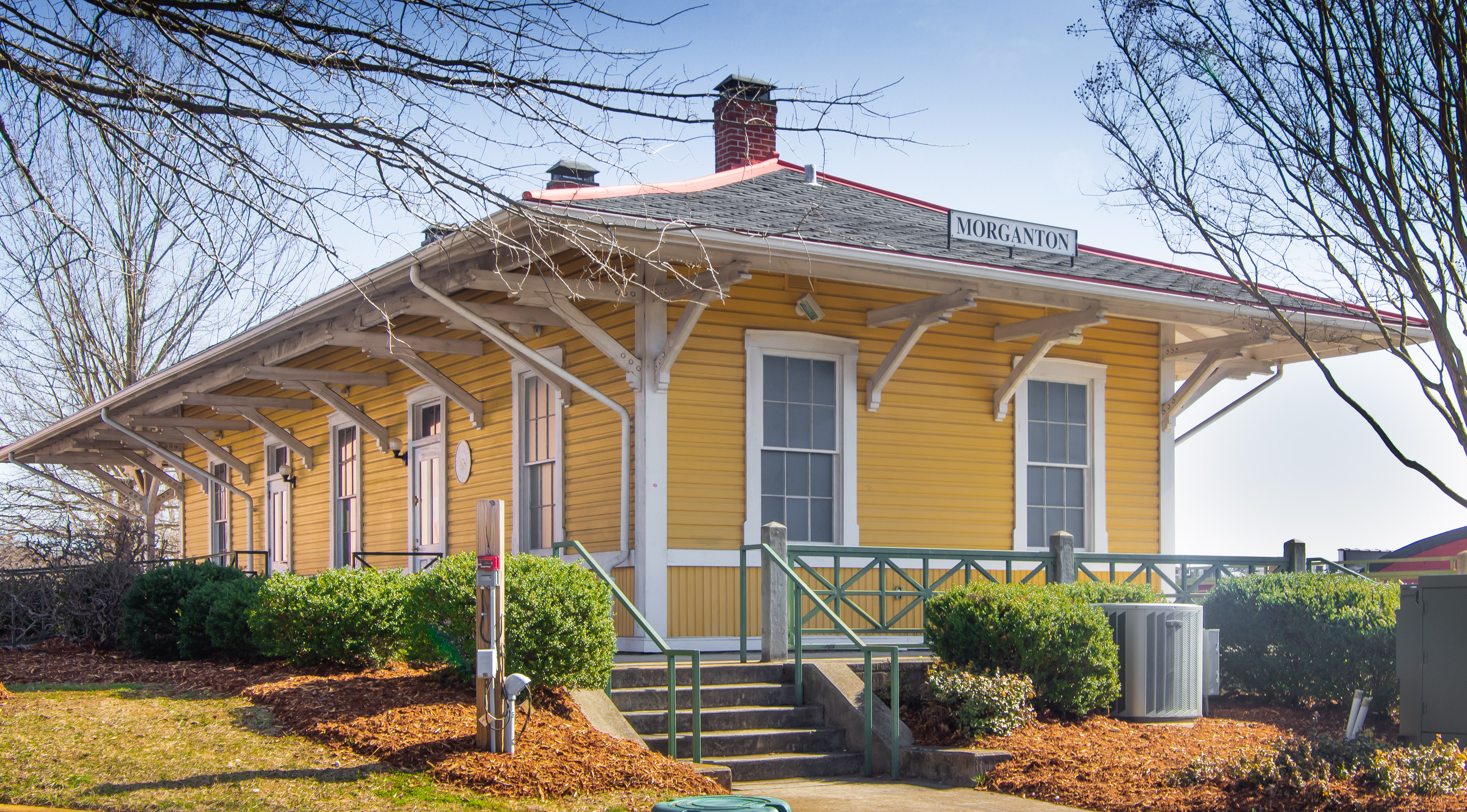
Southern Railway Freight Station in Morganton

An influx of European settlers over the Blue Ridge Mountains, led Morganton to become the first chartered town in western North Carolina in 1784.

On April 17, 1865, there was a small skirmish fought in Morganton, as part of Stoneman's 1865 raid through North Carolina.

Public welfare facilities, such as the North Carolina School for the Deaf: Main Building and Western North Carolina Insane Asylum, were first authorized by the state legislature in the late 19th century.

In the early 20th century, textile mills were developed in the Piedmont as industry left union-dominated areas of the Northeast United States. During the century, however, these industrial jobs gradually moved offshore.

In the late 20th century, Morganton and Burke County, was still largely rural and with big poultry farms, which became locations for industrial-scale poultry processing plants. These jobs attracted many new immigrants to the state from Central America, leading to an increase in the Latino population in the area.

In 2006, an explosion at Synthron, a paint additive chemical manufacturer in Morganton, left 13 injured and one dead.

A 9-foot (2.7 m)-tall bronze statue of a Confederate soldier—erected in 1918—is located atop a stone pedestal in the Old Burke County Courthouse square.

== Geography ==
Morganton is located in central Burke County in the Catawba River valley in the foothills of the Blue Ridge Mountains, and is part of Appalachia. According to the United States Census Bureau, Morganton has a total area of 19.2 square miles (49.6 km^{2}), all land.

=== Climate ===
Morganton has a humid subtropical climate (Cfa) and is located in hardiness zone 7b.

Climate data for Morganton, North Carolina, 1991–2020 normals, extremes 1893–present
Month	Jan	Feb	Mar	Apr	May	Jun	Jul	Aug	Sep	Oct	Nov	Dec	Year
Record high °F (°C)	81 (27)	81 (27)	92 (33)	94 (34)	98 (37)	105 (41)	106 (41)	104 (40)	103 (39)	96 (36)	86 (30)	80 (27)	106 (41)
Mean maximum °F (°C)	69.1 (20.6)	71.9 (22.2)	79.6 (26.4)	85.5 (29.7)	89.2 (31.8)	93.7 (34.3)	95.5 (35.3)	94.3 (34.6)	90.2 (32.3)	84.5 (29.2)	76.4 (24.7)	69.6 (20.9)	96.5 (35.8)
Mean daily maximum °F (°C)	49.4 (9.7)	53.4 (11.9)	60.8 (16.0)	70.6 (21.4)	77.9 (25.5)	84.5 (29.2)	87.7 (30.9)	85.9 (29.9)	80.0 (26.7)	70.9 (21.6)	60.6 (15.9)	51.8 (11.0)	69.5 (20.8)
Daily mean °F (°C)	38.7 (3.7)	41.8 (5.4)	48.7 (9.3)	57.7 (14.3)	65.8 (18.8)	73.3 (22.9)	76.9 (24.9)	75.4 (24.1)	69.3 (20.7)	58.5 (14.7)	47.9 (8.8)	41.1 (5.1)	57.9 (14.4)
Mean daily minimum °F (°C)	27.9 (−2.3)	30.3 (−0.9)	36.6 (2.6)	44.9 (7.2)	53.7 (12.1)	62.2 (16.8)	66.0 (18.9)	64.9 (18.3)	58.5 (14.7)	46.2 (7.9)	35.2 (1.8)	30.3 (−0.9)	46.4 (8.0)
Mean minimum °F (°C)	11.0 (−11.7)	16.1 (−8.8)	21.0 (−6.1)	29.8 (−1.2)	38.6 (3.7)	50.6 (10.3)	57.5 (14.2)	55.6 (13.1)	45.1 (7.3)	30.8 (−0.7)	22.0 (−5.6)	16.8 (−8.4)	9.4 (−12.6)
Record low °F (°C)	−9 (−23)	−1 (−18)	0 (−18)	20 (−7)	29 (−2)	37 (3)	46 (8)	42 (6)	33 (1)	19 (−7)	9 (−13)	−10 (−23)	−10 (−23)
Average precipitation inches (mm)	4.30 (109)	3.67 (93)	4.38 (111)	4.29 (109)	4.11 (104)	4.80 (122)	4.41 (112)	4.80 (122)	4.59 (117)	3.77 (96)	3.75 (95)	4.66 (118)	51.53 (1,308)
Average snowfall inches (cm)	1.0 (2.5)	0.3 (0.76)	1.6 (4.1)	0.0 (0.0)	0.0 (0.0)	0.0 (0.0)	0.0 (0.0)	0.0 (0.0)	0.0 (0.0)	0.0 (0.0)	0.0 (0.0)	1.6 (4.1)	4.5 (11.46)
Average precipitation days (≥ 0.01 in)	10.0	9.4	10.7	9.4	11.2	11.4	12.4	11.2	9.1	8.0	8.3	10.3	121.4
Average snowy days (≥ 0.1 in)	0.3	0.5	0.4	0.0	0.0	0.0	0.0	0.0	0.0	0.0	0.0	0.3	1.5
Source 1: NOAA
Source 2: National Weather Service

== Demographics ==
Historical population
Census	Pop.	Note	%±
1850	558		—
1870	554		—
1880	861		55.4%
1890	1,557		80.8%
1900	1,938		24.5%
1910	2,712		39.9%
1920	2,867		5.7%
1930	6,001		109.3%
1940	7,670		27.8%
1950	8,311		8.4%
1960	9,186		10.5%
1970	13,625		48.3%
1980	13,763		1.0%
1990	15,085		9.6%
2000	17,310		14.7%
2010	16,918		−2.3%
2020	17,474		3.3%
2025 (est.)	17,849	▲	2.1%
U.S. Decennial Census

=== 2020 census ===
Morganton racial composition
Race	Number	Percentage
White (non-Hispanic)	10,866	62.18%
Black or African American (non-Hispanic)	1,709	9.78%
Native American	983	5.63%
Asian	392	2.24%
Pacific Islander	28	0.16%
Other	2,322	13.29%
Mixed	1,169	6.69%

As of the 2020 census, Morganton had a population of 17,474. The median age was 39.5 years. 22.3% of residents were under the age of 18 and 19.6% of residents were 65 years of age or older. For every 100 females there were 94.7 males, and for every 100 females age 18 and over there were 91.5 males age 18 and over.

96.9% of residents lived in urban areas, while 3.1% lived in rural areas.

There were 6,862 households in Morganton, including 3,907 families, and 30.3% had children under the age of 18 living in them. Of all households, 38.3% were married-couple households, 19.7% were households with a male householder and no spouse or partner present, and 34.8% were households with a female householder and no spouse or partner present. About 33.9% of all households were made up of individuals and 15.7% had someone living alone who was 65 years of age or older.

There were 7,559 housing units, of which 9.2% were vacant. The homeowner vacancy rate was 1.8% and the rental vacancy rate was 6.8%.

=== Income and poverty ===
The median household income is $47,715 with an owner-occupied housing rate of 51.6%.

=== 2010 census ===
As of the census of 2010, there were 16,918 people, 7,618 households, and 4,117 families residing in the city. The population density was 953.0 inhabitants per square mile (368.0/km^{2}). There were 7,313 housing units at an average density of 402.6 per square mile (155.4/km^{2}). The racial composition of the city was: 75.67% White, 12.76% Black or African American, 11.16% Hispanic or Latino American, 1.99% Asian American, 0.55% Native American, 0.81% Native Hawaiian or Other Pacific Islander, 6.64% some other race, and 1.58% two or more races.

There were 7,618 households, out of which 22.6% had children under the age of 18 living with them, 43.1% were married couples living together, 12.9% had a female householder with no husband present, and 39.7% were non-families. 34.5% of all households were made up of individuals, and 14.4% had someone living alone who was 65 years of age or older. The average household size was 2.31 and the average family size was 2.92.

In the city, the population was spread out, with 21.1% under the age of 18, 8.5% from 18 to 24, 29.3% from 25 to 44, 22.5% from 45 to 64, and 18.2% who were 65 years of age or older. The median age was 39 years. For every 100 females, there were 95.2 males. For every 100 females age 18 and over, there were 92.0 males.

The median income for a household in the city was $29,836, and the median income for a family was $42,687. Males had a median income of $29,118 versus $24,723 for females. The per capita income for the city was $20,906. About 9.7% of families and 13.6% of the population were below the poverty line, including 17.0% of those under age 18 and 11.9% of those age 65 or over.

== Economy ==
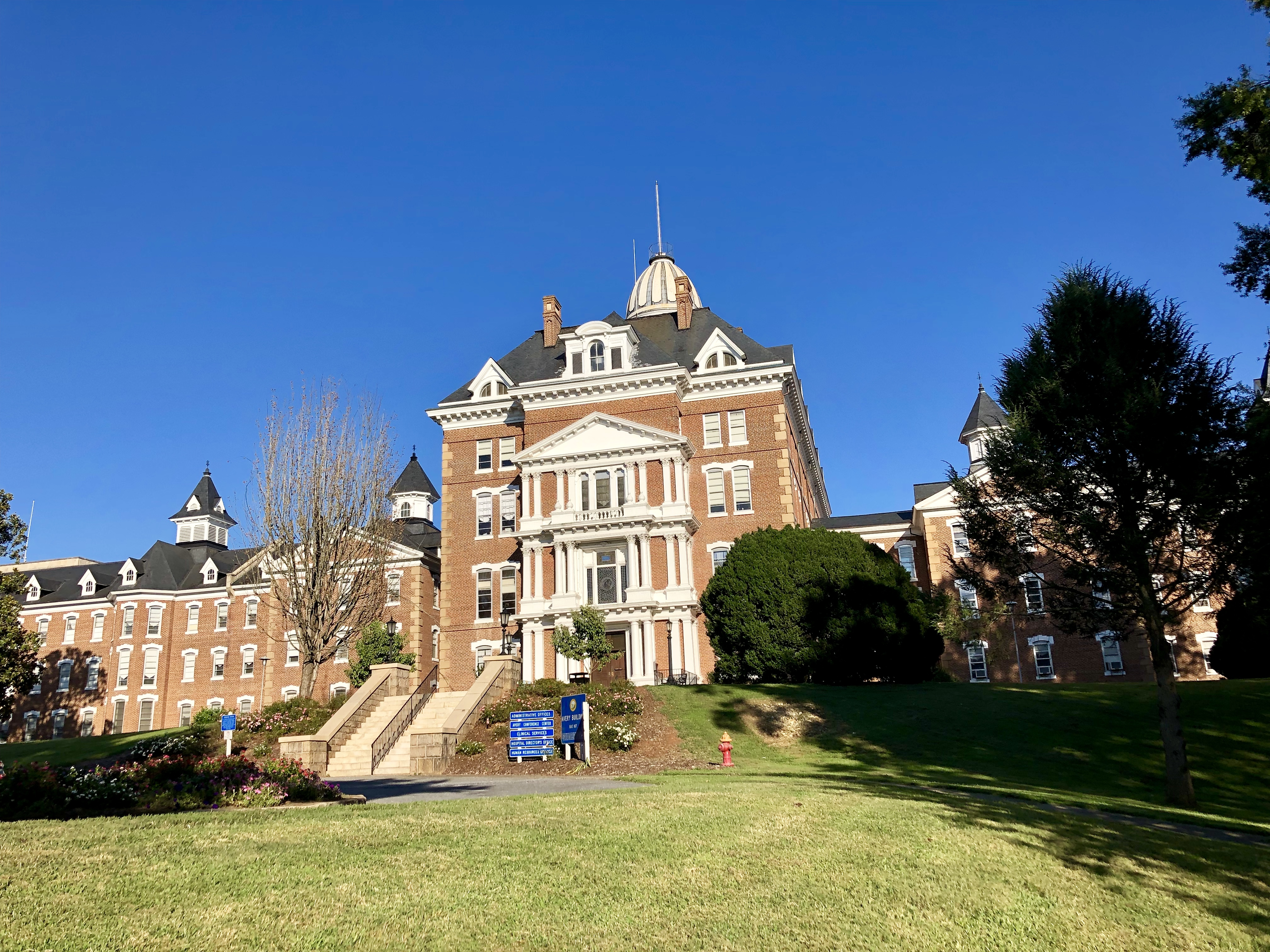
Broughton Hospital Avery Building

State-operated facilities in Morganton include Broughton Hospital (a psychiatric hospital), the North Carolina School for the Deaf, J. Iverson Riddle Developmental Center, and the second campus of the North Carolina School of Science and Mathematics. Other employers include furniture manufacturing facilities and tourists traveling on Interstate 40 to attractions in the Blue Ridge Mountains.

Founded in 2015, the Industrial Commons is an incubator in Morganton for regional co-ops and service programs working to revive the textile and furniture industries in the area.

== Arts and culture ==
=== Events and venues ===
Saint Charles Borromeo Catholic Church hosts an annual Parish Food Festival in the first week of November.

The Morganton Festival takes place the weekend after Labor Day, featuring local vendors and live music.

The City of Morganton Municipal Auditorium is a public auditorium that hosts performances and events.

Morganton hosts summer concerts on the Burke County Courthouse Square, featuring local and regional performers.

== Parks and recreation ==
- Catawba Meadows Park is very close to downtown Morganton and has several baseball diamonds, beach volleyball courts, and other facilities.
- Martha's Park in downtown Morganton features a splash pad, playground, and picnic area.
- Freedom Park, adjacent to Freedom High School in Morganton, is a 30-acre park with multiple sports practice facilities (sand volleyball, football, soccer, baseball/softball), lighted tennis court, picnic shelters with grills, and a one-mile lighted track.

=== Golf courses ===
- Silver Creek Golf Club
- Mimosa Hills Golf and Country Club

== Education ==
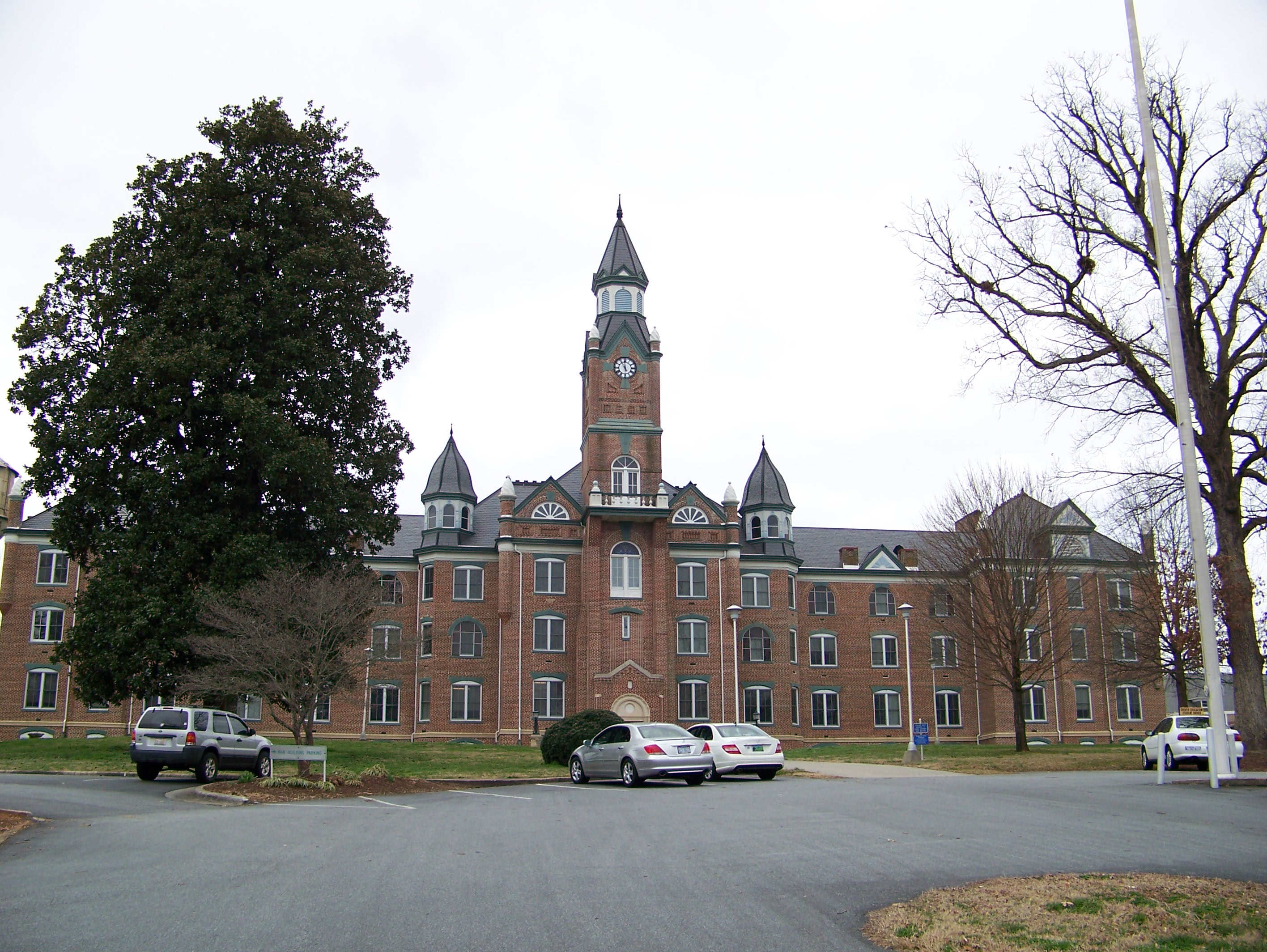
North Carolina School for the Deaf Main Building

=== Colleges and universities ===
- Western Piedmont Community College
- Foothills Higher Education Center, occupied by Western Piedmont Community College's Division of Continuing Education and serves as a satellite campus for certain courses of study offered by Appalachian State University, Lees-McRae College, Montreat College and Western Carolina University.

=== Public schools ===
Burke County Public Schools:

- Freedom High School
- Robert L. Patton High School
- Table Rock Middle School
- Liberty Middle School
- Walter R. Johnson Middle School
- Glen Alpine Elementary School
- Mull Elementary School
- Hillcrest Elementary School
- W. A. Young Elementary School
- Burke Alternative School
- College Street Academy
- Salem Elementary School
- Forest Hill Elementary School
- Oak Hill Elementary School
- Burke Middle College
- Mountain View Elementary School
- East Burke High School
- Draughn High School

=== Private schools ===
- Morganton Day School
- Silver Creek Adventist School

=== Charter schools ===
- New Dimensions Charter School

=== Specialized STEM schools ===
- North Carolina School of Science and Mathematics

=== Special education ===
- North Carolina School for the Deaf
- North Liberty Middle School

=== Other institutions ===
- J. Iverson Riddle Developmental Center
- Broughton Hospital (Psychiatric Hospital Established 1883)

== Media ==
=== Radio ===
- WCIS (AM) / 760 AM / Religious
- WMNC (AM) / 1430 AM / Country
- WMNC-FM / 92.1 FM / Country
- WHGW / 100.3 FM / Religious

=== Print ===
- The Morganton News Herald is a daily newspaper (circulation 12,000).
- The Paper is a community-owned weekly newspaper dedicated exclusively to covering Burke County news, founded in 2023.

== Infrastructure ==
=== Highways ===
- Interstate 40
- U.S. Route 70
- U.S. Route 64

== Notable people ==
- W. Ted Alexander, member of the North Carolina Senate
- Alphonso Calhoun Avery, jurist, military officer, and politician
- Isaac E. Avery, most remembered for the blood-stained note he wrote to his father before dying at Gettysburg during the American Civil War
- William Waightstill Avery, North Carolina politician and lawyer; brother of Isaac E. Avery
- Etta Baker, guitarist and singer of the Piedmont Blues
- Johnny Bristol, musician and Motown producer
- Donald Brown, former CFL defensive back
- Taylor Brown, attorney, LGBTQ rights advocate, and New York City government official
- Tod Robinson Caldwell, governor of North Carolina from 1871 to 1874
- Joe Cheves, professional golfer and member of the North Carolina Sports Hall of Fame
- Warren Daniel, North Carolina State Senator
- Kony Ealy, NFL defensive end
- Robert C. Ervin, North Carolina Superior Court judge
- Sam Ervin, U.S. senator from 1954 to 1974, notable during the Joseph McCarthy hearings and Watergate hearings
- Kerri Gardin, WNBA player
- Alfreda Gerald, vocalist and recording artist
- Oval Jaynes, American football coach
- Leon Johnson, former NFL running back for the New York Jets, Chicago Bears, and San Diego Chargers
- Gray Leadbetter, racing driver
- Dwayne Ledford, former NFL offensive lineman and current offensive line coach for the Atlanta Falcons
- Bill Leslie, TV anchor WRAL News, New Age recording artist
- Chad Lawson, classical and jazz pianist
- Billy Joe Patton, amateur golfer and member of the North Carolina Sports Hall of Fame
- Woody Rich, former MLB player for the Boston Red Sox and Boston Braves
- Tommy Giles Rogers Jr., lead singer and keyboardist for the metal band Between the Buried and Me
- Siiickbrain, singer and model
- Frankie Silver, the first white woman to be capitally executed in North Carolina
- Paige Summers, model
- Isaac M. Taylor, physician and academic; father of musician James Taylor
- Gladys Avery Tillett, political organizer, active in UNESCO and Equal Rights Amendment activism
- Copperhead, southern rock band signed to Mercury Records, featured in the movies Harley Davidson and the Marlboro Man and Dr. Giggles.
- Neil Carswell – singer-songwriter, best known as lead singer for the southern rock band, Copperhead.
