= Paige Summers =

American adult model

- Born: Nancy Ann Coursey; July 21, 1976; Lorain, Ohio, US
- Died: September 22, 2003 (aged 27); Lake James, North Carolina, US
- Resting place: Mountain Grove United Methodist Church Cemetery, Morganton, North Carolina
- Occupation: model
- Years active: 1994–2003
- Modeling information
- Height: 5 ft 8 in (1.73 m)
- Hair color: blonde
- Eye color: blue

Paige Summers (born Nancy Ann Coursey July 21, 1976 – September 22, 2003) was an American adult model. She was a former Penthouse Pet of the Month and Pet of the Year.

== Career ==
She invented the name Paige Summers for her adult modeling career. She appeared in several issues of High Society and Cheri magazines in 1995, and was first chosen Penthouse Pet of the Month for August 1996, but her fame came as Penthouse Pet of the Year for 1998 where she became the first North Carolinian to be so chosen. Kia Motors gave her a Sportage SUV as part of her award, in exchange for advertising. She claimed to earn half a million dollars a year. Summers appeared on The Howard Stern Show and several Penthouse videos.

== Personal life ==
Coursey traveled as part of her career, visiting India and Australia. In 2003, she moved in with her family in Morganton. She was engaged to be married to local pharmacist and real estate owner Bracey Bobbitt on October 11, 2003. She was found dead in her home on the shore of Lake James the morning of September 22 of a drug overdose from a combination of the painkillers codeine and oxycodone.

Coursey is buried at the Mountain Grove United Methodist Church Cemetery in Morganton.

1970s	Evelyn Treacher	Stephanie McLean	Tina McDowall	Patricia Barrett	Avril Lund
1970s	Anneka Di Lorenzo	Laura Bennett Doone	Victoria Lynn Johnson	Dominique Maure	Cheryl Rixon
1980s	Isabella Ardigo	Danielle Deneux	Corinne Alphen	Sheila Kennedy	Linda Kenton
1980s	None	Cody Carmack	Mindy Farrar	Patty Mullen	Ginger Miller
1990s	Stephanie Page	Simone Brigitte	Jisel	Julie Strain	Sasha Vinni
1990s	Gina LaMarca	Andi Sue Irwin	Elizabeth Ann Hilden	Paige Summers	Nikie St. Gilles
2000s	Juliet Cariaga	Zdeňka Podkapová	Megan Mason	Sunny Leone	Victoria Zdrok
2000s	Martina Warren	Jamie Lynn	Heather Vandeven	Erica Ellyson	Taya Parker
2010s	Taylor Vixen	Nikki Benz	Jenna Rose	Nicole Aniston	Lexi Belle
2010s	Layla Sin	Kenna James	Jenna Sativa	Gina Valentina	Gianna Dior
2020s	Lacy Lennon	Kenzie Anne	Amber Marie	Tahlia Paris	Renee Olstead
2020s	Kassie Wallis	-	-	-	-
