= Burke County Public Schools =

School district in Burke County, North Carolina

Burke County Public Schools is the public K-12 school system in Burke County, North Carolina.

== Schools ==
=== High Schools ===
- Burke Middle College
- Draughn High School
- East Burke High School
- Freedom High School
- Hallyburton Academy (alternative)
- Patton High School
- STEAM Academy

=== Middle Schools ===
- East Burke Middle School
- Heritage Middle School
- Johnson Middle School
- Liberty Middle School
- Table Rock Middle School

=== Elementary Schools ===
- Childers Elementary School
- Drexel Elementary School
- Forest Hill Elementary School
- Glen Alpine Elementary School
- Hildebrand Elementary School
- Hildebran Elementary School
- Hillcrest Elementary School
- Icard Elementary School
- Mountain View Elementary School
- Mull Elementary School
- Oak Hill Elementary School
- Salem Elementary School
- Valdese Elementary School
- Young Elementary School

=== Alternative Education ===
- North Liberty School (PK-12)

== History ==
The superintendent of Burke County Public Schools (BCPS) is Mr. Larry Putnam. Larry Putnam was elected into office with a 7–0 vote by the Burke County School Board on April 17, 2011. He preceded Dr. Arthur Stellar, who had become the superintendent of BCPS on September 29, 2009, when, by a majority vote of the Board of Education, was offered a four-year contract. Dr. Stellar replaced former superintendent David Burleson, who on June 30, 2009, was paid off by the Board of Education, ending a 27-year career in Burke County Schools. Upon leaving Burke County, David Burleson found a job as principal of North Forsyth High School in Winston-Salem, North Carolina.
