= Robert Logan Patton High School =

Robert L. Patton High School

Location
- 701 Enola Rd; Morganton, North Carolina 28655; United States
- 35°42′10″N 81°40′12″W

Information
- Type: Public
- Established: 2007 (19 years ago)
- School district: Burke County Public Schools
- CEEB code: 342741
- Principal: Gretchen Reiss
- Teaching staff: 42.40 (on an FTE basis)
- Grades: 9–12
- Enrollment: 753 (2023–2024)
- Student to teacher ratio: 17.76
- Colors: Red, black, and silver
- Nickname: Panthers
- Website: phs.burke.k12.nc.us

Robert L. Patton High School (commonly known as Patton High School) is a public high school in Morganton, North Carolina. It is a part of the Burke County Public Schools district.

== History ==
Robert L. Patton High School opened in August 2007. The school was named after Robert Logan Patton IV, a reverend and educator who founded Patton Academy and the Baptist Church of Morganton. The school shares the same design as Jimmy C. Draughn High School in Valdese, North Carolina, which opened a year later in 2008.

== Athletics ==
Patton is a member of the North Carolina High School Athletic Association (NCHSAA) and are classified as a 3A school. The school is a part of the Western Piedmont 3A/4A Conference. Patton's school colors are red, black, and silver, and its team name is the Panthers.
