= Connelly Springs, North Carolina =

- Town
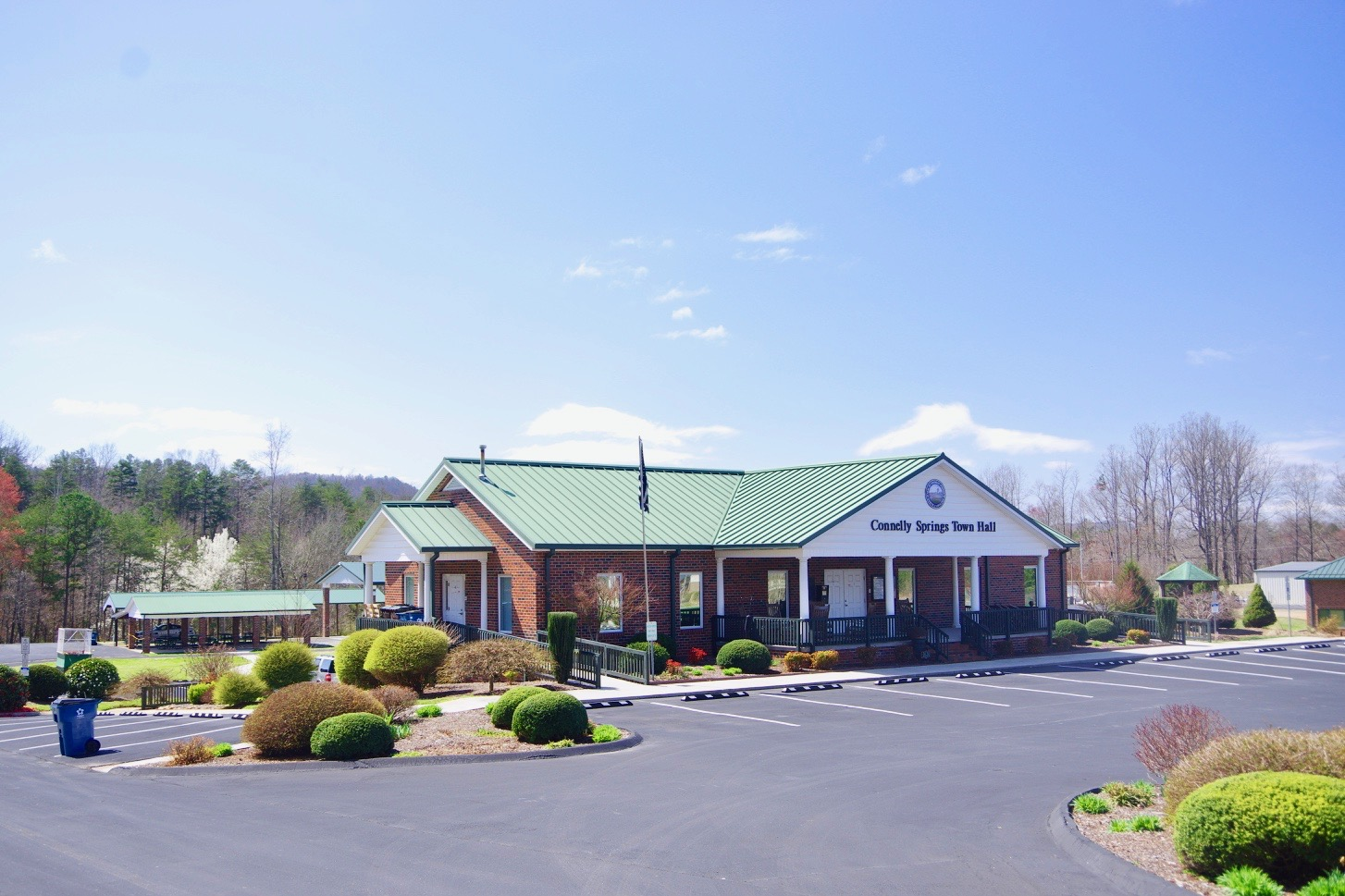
- Town hall

- Seal
- Motto: "Growing a Newly Formed Town on the Dreams and the Heritage of its Past"
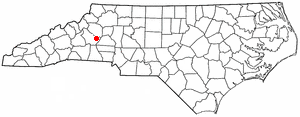
- Location in North Carolina
- Coordinates: 35°44′31″N 81°29′36″W
- Country: United States
- State: North Carolina
- County: Burke

Area
  - Total: 4.99 sq mi (12.93 km^{2})
  - Land: 4.99 sq mi (12.93 km^{2})
  - Water: 0 sq mi (0.00 km^{2})
- Elevation: 1,263 ft (385 m)

Population (2020)
  - Total: 1,529
  - Density: 306/sq mi (118.3/km^{2})
- Time zone: UTC-5 (Eastern (EST))
  - Summer (DST): UTC-4 (EDT)
- ZIP code: 28612
- FIPS code: 37-14280
- GNIS feature ID: 2406306
- Website: www.connellysprings.gov

Connelly Springs is a town in Burke County, North Carolina, United States. As of the 2020 census, Connelly Springs had a population of 1,529. It is part of the Hickory–Lenoir–Morganton Metropolitan Statistical Area.

== History ==
The first settler on record in the area was William Lewis Connelly, a colonel in the North Carolina militia, for whom the town was named. In 1838, Colonel Connelly built a log home and operated a way station where fresh horses could be made available for the stagecoach line that ran from Salisbury to Asheville. He also took in boarders who were looking to spend a night during a long journey. During this time, a settlement grew up around the way station, which was then known as Happy Home, and a post office was established.

In 1885, the area was found to have a mineral spring, thought to be beneficial in healing a large number of diseases. Mrs. Elmira Connelly opened her spring to others, and before long people were arriving by horse and wagon, and by train, to cart water away in five-gallon demijohns. The popularity of Mrs. Connelly's mineral spring led to the construction of the Connelly Mineral Springs Hotel, a 50-room hotel that was built along the railroad tracks, and near the mineral spring discovered by Mrs. Connelly. As the town grew, it became known as Connelly Springs, and was incorporated as such on May 4, 1920.

== Geography ==
Connelly Springs is located in eastern Burke County. It is bordered to the west by the town of Rutherford College and to the north by Rhodhiss Lake on the Catawba River. Interstate 40 forms part of the southern boundary of the town and leads east 10 miles (16 km) to Hickory and west 10 miles (16 km) to Morganton. U.S. Route 70 is the main local road through the town.

According to the United States Census Bureau, the town has a total area of 5.0 square miles (12.9 km^{2}), all land.

== Demographics ==
Historical population
| Census | Pop. | Note | %± |
|---|---|---|---|
| 1930 | 384 | | — |
| 1990 | 1,349 | | — |
| 2000 | 1,814 | | 34.5% |
| 2010 | 1,669 | | −8.0% |
| 2020 | 1,529 | | −8.4% |
U.S. Decennial Census

=== 2020 census ===
Connelly Springs racial composition
| Race | Number | Percentage |
|---|---|---|
| White (non-Hispanic) | 1,214 | 79.4% |
| Black or African American (non-Hispanic) | 38 | 2.49% |
| Native American | 6 | 0.39% |
| Asian | 128 | 8.37% |
| Other/Mixed | 62 | 4.05% |
| Hispanic or Latino | 81 | 5.3% |

As of the 2020 census, Connelly Springs had a population of 1,529, with 642 households and 473 families residing in the town.

The median age was 49.1 years. 18.4% of residents were under the age of 18 and 22.2% were 65 years of age or older. For every 100 females, there were 100.4 males, and for every 100 females age 18 and over there were 95.8 males age 18 and over.

48.2% of residents lived in urban areas, while 51.8% lived in rural areas.

Of the 642 households, 25.1% had children under the age of 18 living in them. Of all households, 49.7% were married-couple households, 17.0% were households with a male householder and no spouse or partner present, and 26.2% were households with a female householder and no spouse or partner present. About 27.9% of all households were made up of individuals, and 12.6% had someone living alone who was 65 years of age or older.

There were 838 housing units, of which 23.4% were vacant. The homeowner vacancy rate was 3.4% and the rental vacancy rate was 16.3%.

=== 2000 census ===
As of the census of 2000, there were 1,814 people, 695 households, and 508 families residing in the town. The population density was 505.0 inhabitants per square mile (195.0/km^{2}). There were 752 housing units at an average density of 209.4 per square mile (80.8/km^{2}). The racial makeup of the town was 90.08% White, 1.65% African American, 0.11% Native American, 7.39% Asian, 0.28% from other races, and 0.50% from two or more races. Hispanic or Latino of any race were 0.22% of the population.

There were 695 households, out of which 33.7% had children under the age of 18 living with them, 56.8% were married couples living together, 10.6% had a female householder with no husband present, and 26.9% were non-families. 22.9% of all households were made up of individuals, and 7.8% had someone living alone who was 65 years of age or older. The average household size was 2.61 and the average family size was 3.06.

In the town, the population was spread out, with 28.9% under the age of 18, 6.6% from 18 to 24, 31.4% from 25 to 44, 22.5% from 45 to 64, and 10.6% who were 65 years of age or older. The median age was 35 years. For every 100 females, there were 98.5 males. For every 100 females age 18 and over, there were 96.2 males.

The median income for a household in the town was $33,889, and the median income for a family was $39,500. Males had a median income of $28,065 versus $20,608 for females. The per capita income for the town was $14,451. About 9.5% of families and 12.2% of the population were below the poverty line, including 16.9% of those under age 18 and 9.1% of those age 65 or over.
