= Ellis Dillahunt =

American football player (born 1964)

No. 34, 29
- Position: Safety

Personal information
- Born: November 25, 1964 (age 61); New Bern, North Carolina, U.S.
- Listed height: 5 ft 11 in (1.80 m)
- Listed weight: 198 lb (90 kg)

Career information
- High school: Jacksonville (Jacksonville, North Carolina)
- College: East Carolina (1984–1987)
- NFL draft: 1988: 10th round, 253rd overall pick

Career history
- Cincinnati Bengals (1988); Washington Redskins (1989)*; Kansas City Chiefs (1989)*; Cleveland Browns (1990)*; New York/New Jersey Knights (1991)
- * Offseason or practice squad member only

Awards and highlights
- First-team All-South independent (1987)

Career NFL statistics
- Games played: 8
- Stats at Pro Football Reference

Ellis Arto Dillahunt Jr. (born November 25, 1964) is an American former professional football player who was a safety in the National Football League (NFL). He played college football for the East Carolina Pirates before playing in the NFL for the Cincinnati Bengals in 1988. He was selected by the Bengals in the 10th round of the 1988 NFL draft.

== Early life ==
Ellis Arto Dillahunt Jr. was born on November 25, 1964 in New Bern, North Carolina. He attended Jacksonville High School in Jacksonville, North Carolina. He was inducted into the Jacksonville Onslow Sports Hall of Fame in 2017.

== College career ==
Dillahunt played college football for the East Carolina Pirates from 1984 to 1987 and was a four-year letterman. He made two interceptions in 1985, one interception in 1986, and five interceptions in 1987. He also returned one punt in 1985 for a seven-yard touchdown. He was named first-team All-South independent in 1987.

== Professional career ==
Dillahunt was selected by the Cincinnati Bengals in the 10th round, with the 253rd overall pick, of the 1988 NFL draft. He signed with the team on July 10. He played in eight games for the Bengals in 1988 before being placed on injured reserve on November 11, 1988. Dillahunt mostly played special teams during his time with the Bengals and was listed as a safety. He became a free agent after the season.

He signed with the Washington Redskins on March 20, 1989. He was waived on August 17, 1989.

Dillahunt was claimed off waivers by the Kansas City Chiefs on August 18, 1989. He was waived on August 30, 1989.

He signed with the Cleveland Browns on March 26, 1990. He was released on August 27, 1990.

Dillahunt played in four games, starting one, for the New York/New Jersey Knights of the World League of American Football in 1991, recording 11 tackles and one pass breakup.
