= New Bridge Middle School =

Location
- 401 New Bridge Street; Jacksonville, North Carolina 28546; United States; 34.750419°N 77.427654°W

Information
- Type: Public
- School district: Onslow County, North Carolina
- Principal: Mrs. Jane Dennis (current)
- Staff: 20
- Faculty: 50
- Grades: 6 - 8
- Enrollment: 498 (2016-17)
- Campus type: Urban
- Colors: Black and Yellow
- Mascot: Bear
- Focus: Science, Technology, Engineering, Arts, Math (STEAM)
- Website: nbms.onslow.k12.nc.us

New Bridge Middle School is one of 8 middle schools in the Onslow County School system (North Carolina). It is Onslow County's middle school magnet program for math, science and technology. While New Bridge occupies one of the older buildings in the district, it is the newest of the 7 middle schools in the district which also serve as one intra-county athletic conference. Beginning in 2012–13, Brewster Middle School (DODEA School aboard Camp LeJeune Marine Corps Base- NC) joined the Onslow County Middle School Athletic Conference.

== Background ==
New Bridge Middle School is located in downtown Jacksonville, NC. It is one of four of Onslow County's magnet schools (the others being Clyde Erwin Elementary School, Northwoods Elementary School, and Onslow Virtual School). New Bridge is Onslow's only magnet in person middle school. The school building was closed for the 1997–98 school year for remodeling. The doors reopened in the fall of 1998 as New Bridge Magnet school for math, science and technology.

As with the areas other middle schools, New Bridge serve students in grades 6, 7 and 8. According to school leaders, three characteristics set NBMS apart from other schools. Those characteristics are: 1) differentiated and integrated lessons; 2) technology integration; and 3) highly motivated students and teacher. Since opening, New Bridge Middle's testing profile has demonstrated high academic gains for students.

== Characteristics of the School ==
The Jacksonville Graded School originally stood at the New Bridge site. The structure operated from 1925 to 1930 with 1st grade through 7th grade being served in one wing and 8th grade through 11th grade in another wing. The school was destroyed by fire in 1930. The two story building that currently houses New Bridge was constructed following the 1930 fire. The school reopened as Jacksonville High School in the early 1930s (but continued to house grades one through eleven). In 1940, another fire destroyed much of the interior of the building. Reusing all of the exterior walls, the school was reopened again in 1941, years prior to the 1954 Brown vs. Board of Education decision by the US Supreme Court that required desegregation and decades before actual racial integration in eastern North Carolina. Jacksonville Senior High School housed white students in the Jacksonville, NC area nearby Georgetown housed their back counterparts. Both schools were located in downtown Jacksonville, just blocks from both the Jacksonville City Hall and the Onslow County Courthouse. The location of Georgetown and Jacksonville Senior was central to the populations of that time. In the 1960s, Jacksonville Senior High School moved to its current location on Henderson Drive. and the building on New Bridge Street became Jacksonville Junior High School and later Jacksonville Middle School. New Bridge was opened with the purpose of reducing overcrowded conditions in other area middle schools.

== Student Population ==
Students historically gained admission to New Bridge only through a lottery process. The lottery process involves the use of a computer program that randomly selects students who have applied. In order to attend, students and parents must agree to support the school's expectations of high achievement and the uniform dress code.

New Bridge Middle School has students coming from all of Onslow County's 19 elementary schools and, after the completion of 8th grade, students matriculating to all 7 high schools. From 1998 to 2010, the transportation department provided door-to-door bus service in a manner similar to all other school. This created a long bus rides for students. Beginning in 2010, transportation services stopped door-to-door bus service. The school now uses a hub bus system in which parents transport their children to one of several hubs (i.e. Swansboro Middle School). Bus service is then provided from the hub to the school (and vice versa in the afternoon). Also, students may now attend who live in the "home district," that is, the area nearest the school.

== Leadership ==
New Bridge Middle School has been served by three principals. The school opened in 1998 under Mrs. Gail Normanly. Former NBMS teacher Brent Anderson became the next principal in 2003. Dr. Christopher Barnes became the school's third principal in 2010.

The full listing of principals at New Bridge Middle School and the schools previously housed in the same building or on the same site include:

- 1922-1928 Mr. H.R. Frehn
- 1928-1937 Mr. B. E. Littlefield
- 1937-1942 Mr. E.L. Key
- 1942-1945 Mr. A.B. Johnson
- 1945-1951 Mr. W.L. Lingle
- 1951-1953 Mr. Cameron West
- 1953-1955 Mr. John H. Bender, Jr.
- 1955-1956 Mr. Robert Gaskins
- 1956-1961 Mr. H.P. Honeycutt
- 1961-1963 Mr. Egbert T. Rouse
- 1963-1976 Mr. William Redfearn
- 1976-1979 Mr. I. L. Leary
- 1979-1982 Mr. Allen D. Bucklew
- 1982-1994 Mr. Edward Herring, Jr.
- 1994-1996 Mr. Eugene U. Taylor
- 1996-1997 Mr. Albert H. James, Jr.
- 1997-1998 CLOSED
- 1998-2004 Mrs. Gail Normanly
- 2004-2010 Mr. Brent Anderson
- 2010-2016 Dr. Christopher Barnes
- 2016- Current Mrs. Jane Dennis

== Awards and Recognitions ==
- Samsung Solve for Tomorrow- State Winner, National Finalist
- NASA Engineering & Design (Real World Challenge)-National Winner
- Microsoft HP ElitePad Pilot School
- National Science Bowl NC/SC Winner
- Project Tomorrow Top 200 School
- Best Buy Teach Award Recipient
- NC Real Deal School
- NC School of Distinction
- Lowe's Heroes School
- Lowe's Toolbox for Education
- Lowe's School Improvement Recipient
- NC Department of Public Instruction Character Education Grant Recipient
- Jones-Onslow EMC Grant Recipient
- TechBridge Partner/Recipient
- Intel Design and Discovery School
- Intel School of Distinction Science finalist
- Christa McAullife Fellow

== B.E.A.R.S. have P.R.I.D.E ==
B.E.A.R.S. represent the school mascot and serves as school-wide guidelines. B.E.A.R.S. stands for: Be prepared, Everyone shows respect, Attitude matters, Remember responsibilities and Safety first. P.R.I.D.E. is the school-wide effort for "Personal Responsibility In Dynamic Education."

== Achievement Performance ==
New Bridge Middle School's 2013-14 READY Accountability data represents one of measures school performance. The model reports achievement in three forms: 1) proficiency, 2) Annual Measurable Objectives (AMO), and 3) academic growth. The READY Accountability model includes testing for 6th, 7th, and 8th grade mathematics and reading and 8th grade science through the North Carolina End-of-Grade (EOG) tests. Our students enrolled in Math 1 take the End-of-Course (EOC) test. The results from these tests are contained within the READY Accountability profile for New Bridge Middle School. Although it is not part of the READY Accountability model, this testing and accountability brief will also report data from the North Carolina Final Exams (NCFE) for 6th, 7th and 8th grade social studies and 6th and 7th grade science.

=== New Standards ===
North Carolina and Onslow County began using the current NC Standard Course of Study in 2012–13. With Common Core for reading and math and the NC Essential Standards for other subject areas, 2013-14 represents the second year working with the current standards.

=== Grade Level Proficiency (GLP) ===
Grade Level Proficiency (GLP), which includes student who scored an achievement level 3, 4, or 5, is 63.4% for New Bridge Middle School (2013–14), the highest GLP of the Onslow County middle schools. All grade levels at New Bridge for all READY tested areas demonstrated increases from 2012–13 to 2013–14 with a reported average increase of 14.4%.

=== College and Career Ready (CCR) ===
A new measure of accountability is College and Career Ready (CCR). As the 2013-14 year ended, North Carolina changed the reporting model from four achievement levels to five achievement levels. The revised achievement levels assist schools in identifying students who are both prepared for the next grade and are career/college ready. Students who score at Achievement Level 1 show limited command of the subject material. Achievement Level 2 students show partial command. Achievement Level 3 is considered the state proficiency standard and students at this level show sufficient command of subject material. Students who score at this level may get on track for career and college readiness with additional academic support. Achievement Levels 4 and 5 are considered career and college ready and students at these levels show solid command and superior command of subject material respectively.

While GLP is calculated using Achievement Levels 3, 4 and 5, CCR is calculated only using Achievement Levels 4 and 5. College and Career Ready proficiency is 53.5% for New Bridge Middle School (2013–14). Although CCR and the five levels didn't exist as a measure in 2012–13, calculations from Onslow's accountability and testing office demonstrate that all grade levels at New Bridge for all READY tested areas increased from 2012–13 to 2013–14 with a reported average increase of 4.2%.

=== Annual Measurable Objectives (AMO) ===
Federal Annual Measurable Objectives (AMO) are calculated using Career and College Readiness Standards (Achievement Levels 4–5). Each school has a number of AMOs based on different subgroup populations. Subgroups for a school may be included in this calculation when 30 or more students are classified in one of the following categories:

- School as a whole (all students);
- American Indian;
- Asian;
- Black;
- Hispanic;
- Two or More Races;
- White;
- Economically Disadvantaged Students;
- Limited English Proficient (LEP)
- Students with Disabilities (SWD) ; and,
- Academically Intellectually Gifted (AIG)

Student scores are included in multiple subgroups. Altogether, New Bridge Middle School has 46 targets for the purpose of calculating Annual Measurable Objectives (AMO). In 2013–14, 41 of the 46 targets were MET. All (100%) targets were MET for reading. Five mathematics targets were missed. The AMOs for math that were “not met” included: all, white (W), economically disadvantaged (EDS), students with disabilities (SWD) and academically intellectually gifted (AIG). Overall, New Bridge Middle School met 89.13% of the AMO targets.

=== Academic Growth ===
The state sets growth standards based upon individual past performance. New Bridge Middle School MET the state's growth expectation for 2013–14. .
