= Coastal Carolina Community College =

College in Jacksonville, North Carolina, US

Coordinates: 34.7722545°N 77.3848373°W

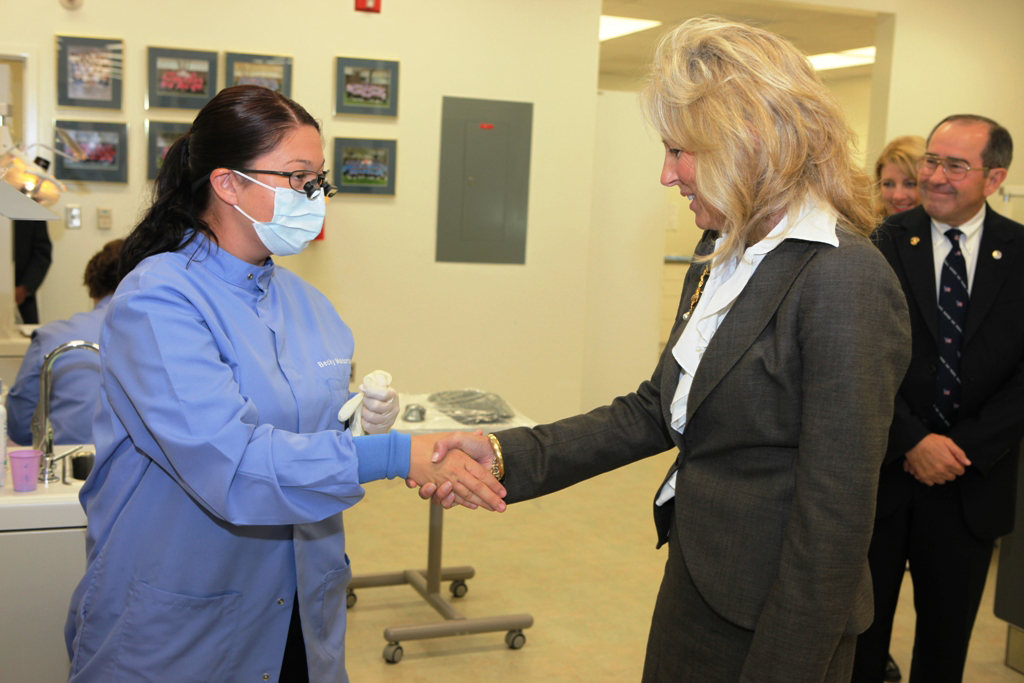
Then-Second Lady Jill Biden visiting Coastal Carolina Community College in 2009.

Coastal Carolina Community College is a public community college in Jacksonville, North Carolina. Roughly eight thousand students are enrolled at the institution. It is part of the North Carolina Community College System and a satellite school of the University of North Carolina at Wilmington.
