= 1987 All-South Independent football team =

American college football season

The 1987 All-South Independent football team consists of American football players chosen by the Associated Press for their All-South independent teams for the 1987 NCAA Division I-A football season.

== Offense ==
=== Quarterbacks ===
- Todd Ellis, South Carolina (AP-1)
- Terrence Jones, Tulane (AP-2)

=== Running backs ===
- Sammie Smith, Florida State (AP-1)
- Shelton Gandy, Southern Miss (AP-2)
- Harold Green, South Carolina (AP-2)

=== Wide receivers ===
- Marc Zeno, Tulane (AP-1)
- Michael Irvin, Miami (AP-1)
- Sterling Sharpe, South Carolina (AP-1)
- Herb Gainer, Florida State (AP-2)
- Brian Blades, Miami (AP-2)

=== Tight ends ===
- Pat Carter, Florida State (AP-1)
- Steve Johnson, Virginia Tech (AP-2)

=== Offensive linemen ===
- Pat Tomberlin, Florida State (AP-1)
- Tim Borcky, Memphis (AP-1)
- Pat Ferrell, Southern Miss (AP-1)
- Matt Patchan, Miami (AP-1)
- Scott Dill, Memphis (AP-2)
- Kevin Keefe, Virginia Tech (AP-2)
- Andre Lockley, Tulane (AP-2)
- Jason Kulpers, Florida State (AP-2)

=== Centers ===
- Woody Myers, South Carolina (AP-1)
- Rod Holder, Miami (AP-2)

== Defense ==
=== Defensive ends ===
- Daniel Stubbs, Miami (AP-1)
- Terry Warren, Florida State (AP-1)
- Marlon Brown, Memphis State (AP-2)
- Bill Hawkins, Miami (AP-2)

=== Defensive tackles ===
- Eric Hayes, Florida State (AP-1)
- Scott Hill, Virginia Tech (AP-1)
- Roy Hart, South Carolina (AP-1)
- Brendan McCormack, South Carolina (AP-2)
- Odell Haggins, Florida State (AP-2)

=== Linebackers ===
- Paul McGowan, Florida State (AP-1)
- George Mira Jr., Miami (AP-1)
- Sidney Coleman, Southern Miss (AP-2)
- Rod Carter, Miami (AP-2)
- Chris Sellars, Louisville (AP-2)
- Onesimus Henry, Southern Miss (AP-2)

=== Defensive backs ===
- Bennie Blades, Miami (AP-1)
- Deion Sanders, Florida State (AP-1)
- Brad Edwards, South Carolina (AP-1)
- Ellis Dillahunt, East Carolina (AP-1)
- Carter Wiley, Virginia Tech (AP-2)
- Mitchell Price, Tulane (AP-2)
- Thomas King, Louisiana-Lafayette (AP-2)
- Greg Philpot, South Carolina (AP-2)

== Special teams ==
=== Kickers ===
- Rodney Price, South Carolina (AP-1)
- Greg Cox, Miami (AP-2)

=== Punters ===
- Billy Knighten, Southern Miss (AP-2)
