= Mill Avenue Historic District =

Historic district in North Carolina, United States

- U.S. National Register of Historic Places
- U.S. Historic district
- Location within North Carolina Location within the United States
- Location: Roughly bounded by Bluff, College, Court, W. Railroad, Wantland, Mill, and First, Jacksonville, North Carolina
- Coordinates: 34°44′56″N 77°26′03″W
- Area: 18 acres (7.3 ha)
- Built: c. 1890
- Architectural style: Bungalow/craftsman, Late Victorian Millwork
- MPS: Onslow County MPS
- NRHP reference No.: 90000439
- Added to NRHP: March 16, 1990

Mill Avenue Historic District is a national historic district located at Jacksonville, Onslow County, North Carolina. The district encompasses 31 contributing buildings, 1 contributing site, and 1 contributing structure in a predominantly residential section of Jacksonville. The district developed after 1890 and includes notable examples of Late Victorian and Bungalow / American Craftsman style architecture. Notable contributing buildings include the Jarman Hotel (c. 1890), Jacksonville Depot, Richard Ward House (c. 1890), Richard Ward Guest House, the Lockamy-Chadwick House, George Bender House (1901), Samuel Ambrose House, the Marine House, Steve Aman House, and the Henrietta Jarman House.

It was listed on the National Register of Historic Places in 1990.
