= Qasim Mitchell =

American football player (born 1979)

Billings Outlaws
- Title: Offensive & defensive line coach

Personal information
- Born: December 3, 1979 (age 46); Jacksonville, North Carolina, U.S.
- Listed height: 6 ft 7 in (2.01 m)
- Listed weight: 347 lb (157 kg)

Career information
- High school: Jacksonville (NC)
- College: North Carolina A&T (1998–2001)
- NFL draft: 2002: undrafted

Career history

Playing
- Cleveland Browns (2002–2003); Chicago Bears (2003–2005); Frankfurt Galaxy (2006); Carolina Panthers (2006)*; Arizona Cardinals (2007)*; San Francisco 49ers (2008)*
- * Offseason or practice squad member only

Coaching
- Spokane Shock; Frisco Fighters (2022) Offensive line coach; Billings Outlaws (2024–present) Offensive and defensive line coach
- Stats at Pro Football Reference

Qasim Mitchell (born December 3, 1979) is an American former professional football player who was an offensive lineman in the National Football League (NFL). He was originally signed by the Cleveland Browns as an undrafted free agent in 2002. He played college football for the North Carolina A&T Aggies.

Mitchell was also a member of the Chicago Bears, Carolina Panthers, Arizona Cardinals, and San Francisco 49ers.

He now coaches at Jacksonville High-school, Jacksonville, North Carolina.

== College career ==
Mitchell attended North Carolina A&T State University and starred in football. As a senior, he was a Sheridan Broadcasting Network Black College All-American selection, won All-Mideastern Athletic Conference first-team honors, and was named the Conference Lineman of the Year.

== Coaching career ==
=== Frisco Fighters ===
On January 15, 2022, Mitchell was announced as the offensive line coach for the Frisco Fighters.

=== Billings Outlaws ===
On November 25, 2023, Mitchell was announced as the offensive and defensive line coach for the Billings Outlaws.
