= Jacksonville High School (North Carolina) =

American public school in North Carolina

Location
- 1021 Henderson Drive; Jacksonville, North Carolina; United States; 34°47′02″N 77°25′38″W

Information
- Type: Public
- Motto: “Forward Ever, Backwards Never”
- School district: Onslow County Schools
- CEEB code: 341950
- Principal: Brenda Hermann
- Teaching staff: 73.01 (FTE)
- Grades: 9–12
- Enrollment: 1,449 (2023-2024)
- Student to teacher ratio: 19.85
- Colors: Red and white
- Athletics conference: Big Carolina 6A/7A
- Team name: Cardinals, Lady Cards
- Website: jhs.onslow.k12.nc.us

Jacksonville High School (JHS) is an International Baccalaureate high school located in Jacksonville, North Carolina for students in grades 9–12.

== Academics ==
Jacksonville High School offers regular, honors, advanced placement, and International Baccalaureate program courses. The course of study usually follows a certain career path determined by the student, upon which they obtain a concentration. Academics are based on an unweighted 4.0 scale and a class rank is also determined by these standards.

== Athletics ==
Jacksonville High School is a member of the North Carolina High School Athletic Association (NCHSAA).

=== State Championships ===
Jacksonville has won the following NCHSAA team state championships:

- Football: 1982 (4A)
- Boys Golf: 1987 (4A)
- Boys Soccer: 2005 (3A), 2012 (3A)
- Girls Soccer: 2024 (3A)
- Boys Outdoor Track & Field: 1968 (3A/4A), 2005 (3A), 2016 (3A)
- Girls Outdoor Track & Field: 1991 (4A), 1993 (4A), 2008 (3A)

== Notable alumni ==
- Ryan Adams, singer-songwriter, producer, and poet
- Jones Angell, play-by-play radio announcer
- David Braxton, former NFL linebacker
- Ellis Dillahunt, former NFL defensive back
- Dave Dunaway, former NFL wide receiver
- Mike Frier, former NFL defensive end/defensive tackle
- Qasim Mitchell, former NFL offensive lineman
- Jamal Shuler, professional basketball player
- Benjy Taylor, college basketball coach
- Tyrone Willingham, retired college football head coach
