= Mike Frier =

American football player (1969–2015)

No. 92, 97
- Positions: Defensive end, defensive tackle

Personal information
- Born: March 20, 1969; Jacksonville, North Carolina, U.S.
- Died: December 31, 2015 (aged 46); Atlanta, Georgia, U.S.
- Listed height: 6 ft 5 in (1.96 m)
- Listed weight: 300 lb (136 kg)

Career information
- High school: Jacksonville (Jacksonville, North Carolina)
- College: Appalachian State
- NFL draft: 1992: 7th round, 178th overall pick

Career history
- Seattle Seahawks (1992)*; Cincinnati Bengals (1992–1994); Seattle Seahawks (1994)
- * Offseason or practice squad member only

Career NFL statistics
- Tackles: 36
- Sacks: 1
- Stats at Pro Football Reference

Michael Anthony Frier (March 20, 1969 – December 31, 2015) was an American professional football defensive end and defensive tackle player. He played college football at Appalachian State University and professionally with the Cincinnati Bengals and the Seattle Seahawks in the National Football League.

== Early life ==
Frier was born on March 20, 1969, to Beatrice Poindexter, a single mother who was unable to care for him on her own, so she placed him in the care of Ann and Ulysses Frier, who would adopt him as their child. Frier still kept in touch with Poindexter throughout the course of his life.

== College career ==
Frier attended Appalachian State University on a four-year football scholarship. His academic struggles early on, almost made him ineligible to play on the football team. In order to pick his grades up, Frier attended summer classes. Despite his best efforts, Frier was forced to sit out his senior season as a result of being academically ineligible. The move lowered his draft stock and he was selected by the Seattle Seahawks in the seventh round of the 1992 NFL draft.

== Professional career ==
Frier attended the Seahawks training camp at the start of the 1992 NFL season, but failed to crack the roster and was waived by the club, and was claimed off waivers by the Cincinnati Bengals that season, where he would start in three games for the team. The following season, Frier would start in six games for the Bengals. Frier's tenure with the club was described as being hostile at best, from butting heads with the coaching staff to his indifference towards the team. Frier was suspended four games without pay, after he made an unexcused absence from a team practice. One game prior to his suspension being lifted, Frier was released from the Bengals on October 12, 1994.

Frier returned to the Seahawks on November 2, 1994, following an injury to Tyrone Rodgers. Although Frier failed to record a tackle in his first couple games with the club, his performance on the field garnered the attention of the team's coaching staff. Frier's return to the Seahawks was seen as a homecoming of sorts, as he had put roots down in the area prior to his release.

== Career ending injury ==
On December 1, 1994, Frier and teammates Lamar Smith and Chris Warren were involved in a collision in Kirkland, Washington, in which Smith's vehicle crashed into a utility pole. Smith and Warren walked away with minor injuries, while Frier took the brunt of the impact and was pinned by a speaker. As a result of the collision, Frier became paralyzed from the waist down. Smith was charged with impaired driving and was ordered to pay Frier 50–75% of his NFL earnings for the duration of his career. Frier was a member of the Seahawks for two weeks at the time of the crash.

== Post-football career ==
Frier and his then-girlfriend Kelly Butler had one daughter, Mik'Kell. Following the accident, Frier remained in the Greater Seattle area where his father Ulysses moved in to take care of him. In the years following the accident, Frier was involved in various charitable endeavours related to spinal cord injuries. Frier had also started an entertainment company called 'Supasize Entertainment', and was planning to pursue a career in music and DJing following his playing career.

== Death ==
Frier died on December 31, 2015, aged 46 after suffering a heart attack. Frier was survived by his daughter, Mik'Kell and a grandson.
