= Jacksonville, North Carolina =

Jacksonville
- City
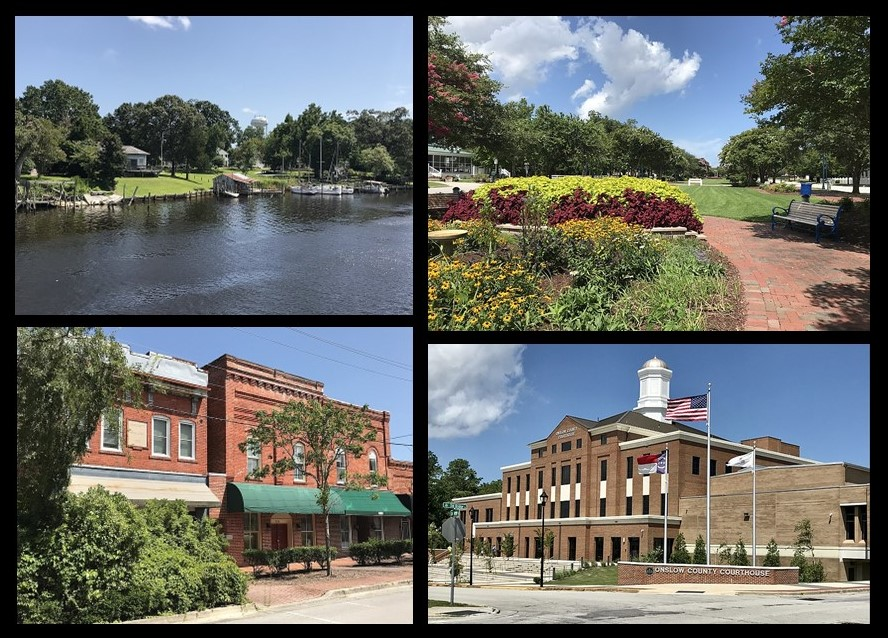
- Clockwise from top left: waterfront along New River, LP Willingham Riverfront Park, Court Street, Onslow County Courthouse

- Flag Seal
- Nicknames: J-Ville, J-Vegas, Marine Town
- Motto: "A Caring Community"
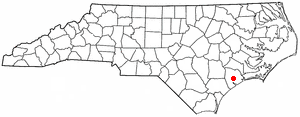
- Location within North Carolina
- Interactive map of Jacksonville
- Location within North Carolina
- Coordinates: 34°45′35″N 77°24′35″W
- Country: United States
- State: North Carolina
- County: Onslow
- Founded: 1757
- Incorporated: 1842
- Named For: Andrew Jackson

Government
  - Mayor: Sammy Phillips

Area
  - Total: 56.42 sq mi (146.14 km^{2})
  - Land: 48.80 sq mi (126.40 km^{2})
  - Water: 7.62 sq mi (19.74 km^{2}) 13.51%
- Elevation: 0 ft (0 m)

Population (2020)
  - Total: 72,723
  - Estimate (2023): 72,879
  - Density: 1,490.1/sq mi (575.35/km^{2})
  - Urban: 111,224 (US: 302nd)
  - Urban density: 1,470/sq mi (567.6/km^{2})
  - Metro: 213,676 (US: 219th)
- Time zone: UTC−05:00 (EST)
  - Summer (DST): UTC−04:00 (EDT)
- ZIP Codes: 28540, 28541, 28546
- Area codes: 910, 472
- FIPS code: 37-34200
- GNIS feature ID: 2404784
- Website: jacksonvillenc.gov

Jacksonville is the county seat of and the most populous community in Onslow County, North Carolina, which is coterminous with the Jacksonville, NC Metropolitan Statistical Area. As of the 2020 census, the population was 72,723, which makes Jacksonville the 14th-most populous city in North Carolina. Demographically, Jacksonville is the youngest city in the United States, with an average age of 22.8 years old, which can be attributed to the large military presence. The low age may also be in part due to the population drastically increasing over the past 80 years, from 783 in the 1930 census to 72,723 in the 2020 census.

It is the home of the United States Marine Corps' Camp Lejeune and New River Air Station. Jacksonville is located adjacent to North Carolina's Crystal Coast area.

== History ==
The end of the Tuscarora wars in 1713 and the forced removal of Native American tribes was followed by permanent settlement of the regions between New Bern and Wilmington. The New River became a major production center for naval stores like turpentine. The downtown waterfront park is built on the original site of Wantland's Ferry.

In 1752, a devastating hurricane destroyed the county seat of Johnston, and Wantlands Ferry, located further up the New River, at the present site of Jacksonville, was chosen as the site of the new county courthouse. The area was later known as Onslow Courthouse. In 1842, the town was incorporated and renamed Jacksonville in honor of former U.S. President Andrew Jackson. The town was briefly captured and occupied in November 1862 by a raiding party led by U.S. Navy Lt. William B. Cushing.

Jacksonville and Onslow County continued to rely on naval stores, lumber, and tobacco crops for industry. In 1939, Colonel George W. Gillette of the U.S. Army Corps of Engineers surveyed and mapped the area from Fort Monroe, Virginia to Fort Sumter, South Carolina which included the Onslow County coastline and the New River. The map is believed to have fostered the interest of the War and Navy Departments in establishing an amphibious training base in the area. Congressman Graham Arthur Barden of New Bern lobbied Congress to appropriate funds for the purchase of about 100,000 acres (400 km^{2}) along the eastern bank of the New River. The establishment in 1941 of Marine Barracks, New River, later renamed Camp Lejeune Marine Corps Base, led to the relocation of 700 families. While the landowners were compensated, many of the families displaced were sharecroppers who did not own the land on which their houses were built, and did not receive compensation for their structures. Some African American families were able to purchase property from Raymond Kellum and established the community of Kellumtown. Other displaced families established communities in Georgetown, Pickettown, Bell Fork, and Sandy Run. The latter communities have since been absorbed by Jacksonville. Colonel Gillette had planned to retire near the small village of Marine, ironically named after a local family whose surname was Marine, but lost his land to the acquisition, as well.

Construction of Camp Lejeune caused a population explosion in the small town of about 800 inhabitants, as new workers migrated to the area. Growth continued to be fueled by both young Marine families and military retirees. Today, Jacksonville's primary industry is retail sales and services. The primary migration draw continues to be the U.S. Marine Corps.

The Bank of Onslow and Jacksonville Masonic Temple, Mill Avenue Historic District, and Pelletier House and Wantland Spring are listed on the National Register of Historic Places.

In 2016, Jacksonville became the first jurisdiction to adopt a paid holiday honoring the 13th Amendment to the United States Constitution, which made slavery in the United States and its territories illegal. The resolution of adoption mentions "the prevention of the modern slavery" which it describes as "human trafficking", including child labor and military service.

== Geography ==
According to the United States Census Bureau, the city has a total area of 56.42 square miles (146.1 km^{2}), of which 48.80 square miles (126.4 km^{2}) is land and 7.62 square miles (19.7 km^{2}) (13.51%) is water. It is about 60 minutes from Wilmington and 15 minutes from the Intracoastal Waterway.

=== Climate ===
Jacksonville has a humid subtropical climate (Köppen Cfa) with long, hot summers and short, mild winters.

Climate data for Jacksonville, North Carolina (Marine Corps Air Station New River) 1991–2020 normals, extremes 1955–present
Month	Jan	Feb	Mar	Apr	May	Jun	Jul	Aug	Sep	Oct	Nov	Dec	Year
Record high °F (°C)	81 (27)	94 (34)	92 (33)	95 (35)	99 (37)	101 (38)	102 (39)	101 (38)	97 (36)	95 (35)	89 (32)	82 (28)	102 (39)
Mean maximum °F (°C)	74.8 (23.8)	77.4 (25.2)	82.6 (28.1)	86.6 (30.3)	91.6 (33.1)	95.8 (35.4)	96.3 (35.7)	95.2 (35.1)	91.6 (33.1)	86.3 (30.2)	81.0 (27.2)	75.9 (24.4)	97.5 (36.4)
Mean daily maximum °F (°C)	56.0 (13.3)	59.3 (15.2)	65.8 (18.8)	74.0 (23.3)	80.4 (26.9)	86.5 (30.3)	89.3 (31.8)	87.8 (31.0)	83.3 (28.5)	75.0 (23.9)	66.2 (19.0)	59.0 (15.0)	73.5 (23.1)
Daily mean °F (°C)	45.6 (7.6)	48.4 (9.1)	54.5 (12.5)	62.9 (17.2)	70.4 (21.3)	77.5 (25.3)	80.9 (27.2)	79.6 (26.4)	74.9 (23.8)	64.9 (18.3)	55.1 (12.8)	48.7 (9.3)	63.6 (17.6)
Mean daily minimum °F (°C)	35.2 (1.8)	37.5 (3.1)	43.1 (6.2)	51.8 (11.0)	60.5 (15.8)	68.5 (20.3)	72.5 (22.5)	71.4 (21.9)	66.5 (19.2)	54.8 (12.7)	44.0 (6.7)	38.4 (3.6)	53.7 (12.1)
Mean minimum °F (°C)	18.3 (−7.6)	21.8 (−5.7)	26.5 (−3.1)	34.5 (1.4)	46.6 (8.1)	57.0 (13.9)	64.3 (17.9)	62.9 (17.2)	54.6 (12.6)	37.8 (3.2)	27.8 (−2.3)	23.8 (−4.6)	16.2 (−8.8)
Record low °F (°C)	0 (−18)	9 (−13)	12 (−11)	25 (−4)	33 (1)	45 (7)	54 (12)	54 (12)	44 (7)	24 (−4)	19 (−7)	−5 (−21)	−5 (−21)
Average precipitation inches (mm)	3.96 (101)	3.50 (89)	3.79 (96)	3.35 (85)	4.20 (107)	5.24 (133)	6.18 (157)	7.48 (190)	7.45 (189)	4.13 (105)	3.55 (90)	3.68 (93)	56.51 (1,435)
Average snowfall inches (cm)	0.4 (1.0)	0.2 (0.51)	0.0 (0.0)	0.0 (0.0)	0.0 (0.0)	0.0 (0.0)	0.0 (0.0)	0.0 (0.0)	0.0 (0.0)	0.0 (0.0)	0.0 (0.0)	0.0 (0.0)	0.6 (1.5)
Average precipitation days (≥ 0.01 in)	10.4	9.8	10.3	8.3	10.4	11.8	13.0	13.7	10.8	9.5	9.3	10.4	127.7
Average snowy days (≥ 0.1 in)	0.2	0.3	0.0	0.0	0.0	0.0	0.0	0.0	0.0	0.0	0.0	0.0	0.5
Source: NOAA

== Demographics ==
Historical population
Census	Pop.	Note	%±
1870	60		—
1880	94		56.7%
1890	170		80.9%
1900	309		81.8%
1910	505		63.4%
1920	656		29.9%
1930	783		19.4%
1940	873		11.5%
1950	3,960		353.6%
1960	13,491		240.7%
1970	16,289		20.7%
1980	18,237		12.0%
1990	30,013		64.6%
2000	66,715		122.3%
2010	70,145		5.1%
2020	72,723		3.7%
2023 (est.)	72,879		0.2%
U.S. Decennial Census; 2020

=== 2020 census ===
As of the 2020 census, Jacksonville had a population of 72,723. The median age was 23.3 years. 19.1% of residents were under the age of 18 and 7.3% of residents were 65 years of age or older. For every 100 females there were 151.1 males, and for every 100 females age 18 and over there were 165.5 males age 18 and over.

96.5% of residents lived in urban areas, while 3.5% lived in rural areas.

There were 20,582 households in Jacksonville, including 15,491 families; 36.3% had children under the age of 18 living in them. Of all households, 50.1% were married-couple households, 16.8% were households with a male householder and no spouse or partner present, and 27.6% were households with a female householder and no spouse or partner present. About 24.9% of all households were made up of individuals and 7.6% had someone living alone who was 65 years of age or older.

There were 24,004 housing units, of which 14.3% were vacant. The homeowner vacancy rate was 3.0% and the rental vacancy rate was 12.0%.

Racial composition as of the 2020 census
Race	Number	Percent
White	42,196	58.0%
Black or African American	13,254	18.2%
American Indian and Alaska Native	498	0.7%
Asian	2,464	3.4%
Native Hawaiian and Other Pacific Islander	455	0.6%
Some other race	5,440	7.5%
Two or more races	8,416	11.6%
Hispanic or Latino (of any race)	13,540	18.6%

=== 2000 census ===
At the 2000 census, there were 66,715 people, 17,175 households, and 13,533 families residing in the city. The population density was 1,500.0 inhabitants per square mile (579.2/km^{2}). The 18,312 housing units averaged 411.7 per square mile (159.0/km^{2}). The racial composition of the city was 63.94% White, 23.96% African American, 2.07% Asian, 0.75% Native American, 0.19% Pacific Islander, 5.42% some other race, and 3.67% two or more races.

Of the 17,175 households, 49.5% had children under the age of 18 living with them, 63.8% were married couples living together, 12.3% had a female householder with no husband present, and 21.2% were not families. About 16.6% of all households were made up of individuals, and 5.1% had someone living alone who was 65 years of age or older. The average household size was 2.83 and the average family size was 3.8

In the city, the population was distributed as 24.3% under 18, 36.3% from 18 to 24, 25.9% from 25 to 44, 8.8% from 45 to 64, and 4.8% who were 65 or older. The median age was 22 years. Jacksonville has been named the youngest city in the nation (lowest median age) on various lists. For every 100 females, there were 156.2 males. For every 100 females 18 and over, there were 178.6 males.

The median income for a household in the city was $32,544, and for a family was $33,763. Males had a median income of $17,121 versus $19,931 for females. The per capita income for the city was $14,237. About 12.5% of families and 14.1% of the population were below the poverty line, including 18.0% of those under age 18 and 17.7% of those age 65 or over.

== Economy ==
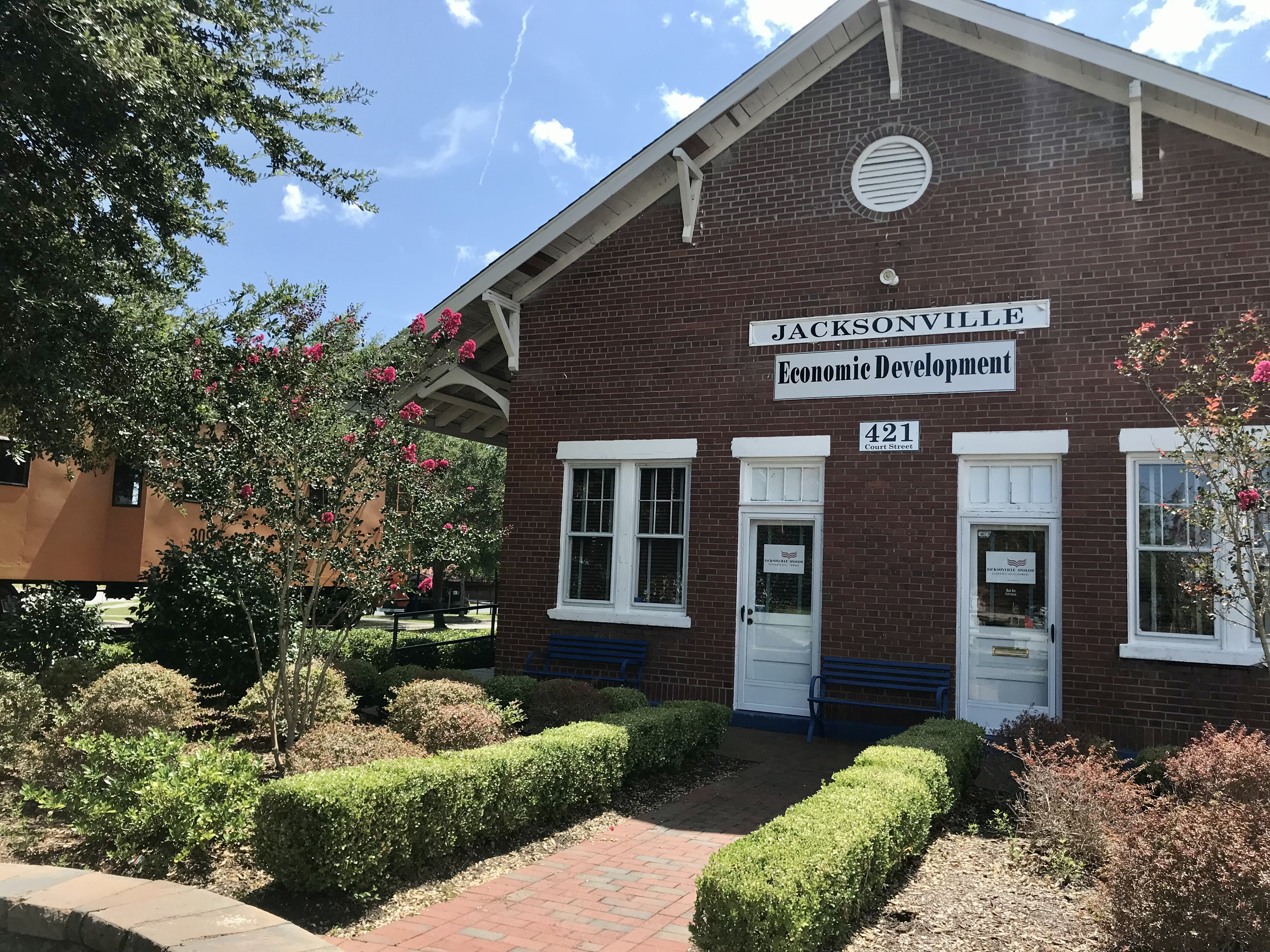
Jacksonville economic development office

=== Top employers ===
According to the city's 2012 Comprehensive Annual Financial Report, the top employers in the city are:

#	Employer	# of employees
1	United States Department of Defense	1000+
2	Onslow County Schools	1000+
3	Marine Corps Base Camp Lejeune	1000+
4	Onslow Memorial Hospital	1000+
5	Onslow County	1000+
6	Walmart	1000+
7	Coastal Carolina Community College	500–999
8	Convergys	500–999
9	City of Jacksonville	500–999
10	Food Lion	250–499
11	Coastal Enterprises	250–499
12	McDonald's	250–499
13	Lowe's	250–499
14	Alorica	250–499
15	Stanadyne	250–499

Current state of the economy

U.S. Bureau of Labor Statistics, from March 2025 to August 2025, there have been slight changes in civilian labor force, employment, unemployment, and unemployment rate values. July 2025, suffer worse declining values compared to the other months mentioned, expected for the unemployment rate, which in that case would be August 2025. Over the course of the 6 months, the general pattern is the unemployment rate has increased over time while people that are employed have decreased over time. ^{[7]} These factors include a decrease in jobs available and other resources like lack of education, and other resources.

== Law and government ==
The mayor of Jacksonville is Sammy Phillips. The city manager is Joshua W Ray, and the deputy city manager is Ron Massey. The postmaster of Jacksonville is Jamie Thompson.

=== City Council ===
The Jacksonville City Council members (as of 2026) are:

- N. Jerome Willingham – Ward 1
- Rev. Mickey Smith – Ward 2
- Logan Sosa – Ward 3
- Dr. Angelia Washington – Ward 4
- Cindy Edwards – At-large (Mayor Pro-Tem)
- Michael Yaniero – At-large

== Education ==
=== Public schools ===
Onslow County Schools serves the city, except for areas on U.S. military bases, including Camp Lejeune and Marine Corps Air Station New River; the military areas are served by Department of Defense Education Activity (DoDEA) schools.

Alternative school

- Onslow County Learning Center

Elementary schools

- Bell Fork Elementary School
- Blue Creek Elementary School
- Carolina Forest Elementary School
- Clyde Erwin Elementary School
- Hunters Creek Elementary School
- Jacksonville Commons Elementary School
- MeadowView Elementary School
- Morton Elementary School
- Northwoods Elementary School
- Parkwood Elementary School
- Silverdale Elementary School
- Southwest Elementary School
- Stateside Elementary School
- Summersill Elementary School
- Thompson Elementary School
- Dixon Elementary School

Middle schools

- Dixon Middle School
- Hunters Creek Middle School
- Jacksonville Commons Middle School
- Northwoods Park Middle School
- New Bridge Middle School
- Southwest Middle School

High schools

- Dixon High School
- Jacksonville High School
- Northside High School
- Richlands High School
- Southwest High School
- White Oak High School
- Swansboro High School

MCAS New River is zoned to Delalio Elementary School in MCAS New River and Brewster Middle School and Lejeune High School in Camp Lejeune.

=== Private schools ===
- Fellowship Christian Academy
- Grace Baptist School
- Infant Of Prague Catholic School
- Jacksonville Christian Academy
- Living Water Christian School
- Montessori Children's School
- St. Anne's Day School
- Shiloh Institute of Learning
- One World Montessori School

=== Public magnet schools ===
- Clyde Erwin Elementary School (year round school)
- New Bridge Middle School
- Northwoods Elementary School (year round school)
- Onslow Virtual Secondary School

=== Higher education ===
- Coastal Carolina Community College
- Miller-Motte Technical College - Jacksonville branch
- University of Mount Olive - Jacksonville branch

=== Charter school ===
- ZECA School of Arts and Technology

== Transportation ==
In 2009, the Jacksonville metropolitan statistical area ranked as the ninth-highest in the United States for ratio of commuters who walked to work (8.1%).

The city's commercial air services are filled by Albert J. Ellis Airport in nearby Richlands.

== Notable people ==
- Bali Baby, rapper (born in Jacksonville)
- David Charles Abell, conductor (born in Jacksonville)
- Ryan Adams, singer-songwriter, who frequently makes reference to Jacksonville in his songs
- Jones Angell, play-by-play announcer for the North Carolina Tar Heels
- Troy Barnett, former NFL defensive lineman
- Art Bell, talk radio host
- David Braxton, former NFL player
- Levi Brown, former NFL offensive tackle
- Joe Cannon, former MLB outfielder
- Burke Day, Georgia state legislator and businessman
- Edward B. Dudley, governor, congressman
- Dave Dunaway, former NFL player
- Jacob Evans, NBA player
- Chad Fonville, former MLB player for the Montreal Expos, Los Angeles Dodgers, Chicago White Sox, and Boston Red Sox
- Mike Frier, former NFL player for the Cincinnati Bengals and Seattle Seahawks
- David Green, former NFL and CFL player
- Sara Hickman, singer
- Marcus Jones, former NFL player for the Tampa Bay Buccaneers
- Christina Koch, engineer and NASA astronaut
- Qasim Mitchell, former NFL player
- Quincy Monk, former NFL player
- Donte Paige-Moss, former AFL player
- Michael R. Nelson, former mayor of Carrboro and first openly gay mayor in North Carolina
- Dian Parkinson, television personality and model
- Danielle Peck, singer
- Andre Purvis, former NFL player for the Cincinnati Bengals
- A.J. Styles, professional wrestler
- Tyrone Willingham, former head football coach at University of Washington and the University of Notre Dame

== See also ==
- List of municipalities in North Carolina
