= Paul Barringer (born 1778) =

American politician

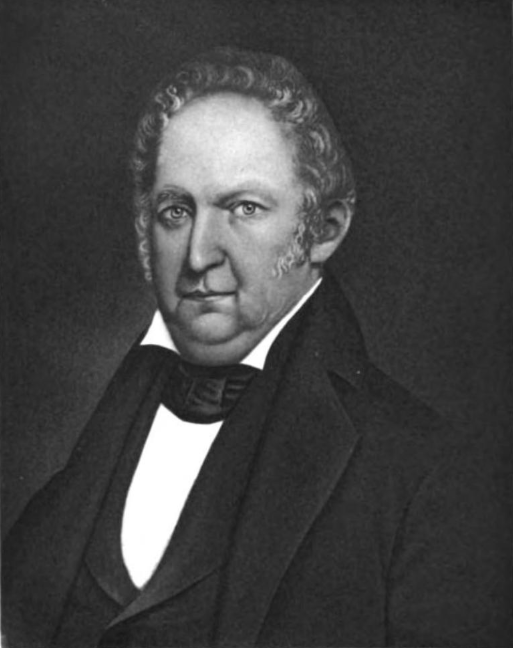

Member of the North Carolina Senate
- In office 1822, 1824
- Constituency: Cabarrus County

Member of the North Carolina House of Commons
- In office 1793, 1794, 1806–1815

Personal details
- Born: September 26, 1778 Mecklenburg County, North Carolina
- Died: June 20, 1844 (aged 65) Lincolnton, North Carolina
- Party: Federalist; Whig
- Spouse: Elizabeth Brandon (m. 1805)
- Occupation: Businessman, politician

Paul Barringer (1778–1844) was a North Carolina politician, businessman and military veteran of the War of 1812. General Barringer served in the North Carolina House of Commons (1793, 1794, 1806–1815) and in the North Carolina Senate (1822, 1824), representing Cabarrus County. He was at first a Federalist and later a Whig.

== Biography ==
Barringer was born on September 26, 1778, at Poplar Grove, Mecklenburg County, North Carolina, the son of John Paul Barringer and his wife, Ann Eliza Eisman. He was the brother of Daniel Laurens Barringer, the father of Daniel M. Barringer and Rufus Barringer, and the grandfather of Paul Brandon Barringer and Daniel Barringer. He was married on February 21, 1805, to Elizabeth Brandon, the daughter of Captain Matthew Brandon.

Barringer was commissioned December 23, 1812, by Gov. William Hawkins, and served as brigadier general of a company of volunteers in the War of 1812. He was a member of the North Carolina House of Commons in the years 1806–1815, and of the Senate in 1822. He died at Burton's Hotel in Lincolnton, North Carolina, on June 20, 1844, and was buried in Concord, North Carolina.
