= Cabarrus (surname) =

Cabarrus or Cabarrús is a surname of Basque origin. People bearing the name include:

- François Cabarrus, 1st Count of Cabarrús (1752–1810), a Spanish financier born in Bayonne, Aquitaine
- Thérésa Tallien (1773–1835), born Teresa de Cabarrús y Galabert, a French socialite and the daughter of François Cabarrus
- Stephen Cabarrus (1754–1808), an early Speaker of the North Carolina House of Representatives and the namesake of Cabarrus County
