= Afton Run =

Stream in North Carolina, U.S.

Afton Run Tributary to Coddle Creek
- Location of Afton Run mouth Afton Run (the United States)

Location
- Country: United States
- State: North Carolina
- County: Cabarrus

Physical characteristics
- Source: Mill Creek divide
  - location: about 2 miles west of Kannapolis, North Carolina
  - coordinates: 35°29′20″N 080°40′39″W
  - elevation: 790 ft (240 m)
- Mouth: Coddle Creek
  - location: about 3 miles west of Concord, North Carolina
  - coordinates: 35°24′31″N 080°40′29″W
  - elevation: 589 ft (180 m)
- Length: 6.13 mi (9.87 km)
- Basin size: 6.07 square miles (15.7 km^{2})
- Discharge
  - location: Coddle Creek
  - average: 7.25 cu ft/s (0.205 m^{3}/s) at mouth with Coddle Creek

Basin features
- Progression: Coddle Creek → Rocky River → Pee Dee River → Winyah Bay → Atlantic Ocean
- River system: Pee Dee River
- Tributaries
  - left: unnamed tributaries
  - right: unnamed tributaries
- Bridges: Mooresville Road, Dogwood Boulevard, Trinity Church Road, Kannapolis Parkway, NC 73, I-85

Afton Run is a 6.13 mi (9.87 km) long 1st order tributary to Coddle Creek in Cabarrus County, North Carolina. This is the only stream of this name in the United States.

== Variant names ==
According to the Geographic Names Information System, it has also been known historically as:

- Ashton Branch
- Astin's Branch

== Course ==
Afton Run rises about 2 miles west of Kannapolis, North Carolina and then flows south to join Coddle Creek about 3 miles west of Concord.

== Watershed ==
Afton Run drains 6.07 square miles (15.7 km^{2}) of area, receives about 46.9 in/year of precipitation, has a wetness index of 411.40, and is about 32% forested.
