= Lick Branch (Dutch Buffalo Creek tributary) =

Stream in North Carolina, USA

Lick Branch Tributary to Dutch Buffalo Creek
- Location of Lick Branch mouth Lick Branch (Dutch Buffalo Creek tributary) (the United States)

Location
- Country: United States
- State: North Carolina
- County: Cabarrus; Rowan

Physical characteristics
- Source: Cold Water Creek divide
  - location: about 3 miles east of Kannapolis, North Carolina
  - coordinates: 35°30′24″N 080°32′00″W
  - elevation: 798 ft (243 m)
- Mouth: Dutch Buffalo Creek
  - location: about 1 mile west of Rimer, North Carolina
  - coordinates: 35°28′13″N 080°30′05″W
  - elevation: 659 ft (201 m)
- Length: 3.38 mi (5.44 km)
- Basin size: 1.62 square miles (4.2 km^{2})
- Discharge
  - location: Dutch Buffalo Creek
  - average: 2.07 cu ft/s (0.059 m^{3}/s) at mouth with Dutch Buffalo Creek

Basin features
- Progression: Dutch Buffalo Creek → Rocky River → Pee Dee River → Winyah Bay → Atlantic Ocean
- River system: Pee Dee River
- Tributaries
  - left: unnamed tributaries
  - right: unnamed tributaries
- Bridges: Gregory Road, Sapp Road, Barrier Road

Lick Branch is a 3.38 mi (5.44 km) long 1st order tributary to Dutch Buffalo Creek in Cabarrus County, North Carolina.

== Course ==
Lick Branch rises about 3 miles east of Kannapolis, North Carolina in Rowan County, and then flows southeast into Cabarrus County to join Dutch Buffalo Creek about 1 mile west of Rimer.

== Watershed ==
Lick Branch drains 1.62 square miles (4.2 km^{2}) of area, receives about 46.8 in/year of precipitation, has a wetness index of 411.61, and is about 51% forested.
