= Wolf Meadow Branch =

Stream in North Carolina, USA

Wolf Meadow Branch Tributary to Coddle Creek
- Location of Wolf Meadow Branch mouth Wolf Meadow Branch (the United States)

Location
- Country: United States
- State: North Carolina
- County: Cabarrus

Physical characteristics
- Source: Irish Buffalo Creek divide
  - location: pond about 1 mile southwest of Concord, North Carolina
  - coordinates: 35°24′02″N 080°37′31″W
  - elevation: 695 ft (212 m)
- Mouth: Coddle Creek
  - location: Roberta Mill, North Carolina
  - coordinates: 35°21′31″N 080°37′50″W
  - elevation: 548 ft (167 m)
- Length: 2.50 mi (4.02 km)
- Basin size: 3.68 square miles (9.5 km^{2})
- Discharge
  - location: Coddle Creek
  - average: 4.45 cu ft/s (0.126 m^{3}/s) at mouth with Coddle Creek

Basin features
- Progression: Coddle Creek → Rocky River → Pee Dee River → Winyah Bay → Atlantic Ocean
- River system: Pee Dee River
- Tributaries
  - left: unnamed tributaries
  - right: unnamed tributaries
- Bridges: Farmwood Boulevard, Roberta Road, Stough Road

Wolf Meadow Branch is a 2.50 mi (4.02 km) long 1st order tributary to Coddle Creek in Cabarrus County, North Carolina. This is the only stream of this name in the United States.

== Course ==
Wolf Meadow Branch rises in a pond about 1 mile southwest of Concord, North Carolina and then flows southwest to join Coddle Creek at Roberta Mill.

== Watershed ==
Wolf Meadow Branch drains 3.68 square miles (9.5 km^{2}) of area, receives about 47.1 in/year of precipitation, has a wetness index of 454.27, and is about 28% forested.
