= Daniel Barringer =

Daniel Barringer may refer to:

- Daniel Laurens Barringer (1788–1852), U.S. Congressman from North Carolina, 1825–1834
- Daniel Moreau Barringer (1806–1873), U.S. Congressman from North Carolina, 1843–1849
- Daniel Barringer (geologist) (1860–1929), American geologist, best known for proving Meteor Crater (Arizona) is an impact crater
