= Little Buffalo Creek (Dutch Buffalo Creek tributary) =

Stream in North Carolina, USA

Little Buffalo Creek Tributary to Dutch Buffalo Creek
- Location of Little Buffalo Creek mouth Little Buffalo Creek (Dutch Buffalo Creek tributary) (the United States)

Location
- Country: United States
- State: North Carolina
- County: Cabarrus; Rowan

Physical characteristics
- Source: Reedy Creek divide
  - location: pond about 0.5 miles northwest of Gold Hill, North Carolina
  - coordinates: 35°31′38″N 080°21′20″W
  - elevation: 745 ft (227 m)
- Mouth: Dutch Buffalo Creek
  - location: about 1.5 miles northeast of Mount Pleasant, North Carolina
  - coordinates: 35°25′15″N 080°24′22″W
  - elevation: 524 ft (160 m)
- Length: 8.74 mi (14.07 km)
- Basin size: 17.04 square miles (44.1 km^{2})
- Discharge
  - location: Dutch Buffalo Creek
  - average: 20.02 cu ft/s (0.567 m^{3}/s) at mouth with Dutch Buffalo Creek

Basin features
- Progression: Dutch Buffalo Creek → Rocky River → Pee Dee River → Winyah Bay → Atlantic Ocean
- River system: Pee Dee River
- Tributaries
  - left: Butcher Branch
  - right: unnamed tributaries
- Bridges: Old Beatty Ford Road, Old Mine Road, Kluttz Road, Sansbury Road, Drye Road, NC 49

Little Buffalo Creek is a 8.74 mi (14.07 km) long 3rd order tributary to Dutch Buffalo Creek in Cabarrus County, North Carolina.

== Course ==
Little Buffalo Creek rises in a pond about 0.5 miles northwest of Gold Hill, North Carolina in Rowan County, and then flows southwest into Cabarrus County to join Dutch Buffalo Creek about 1.5 miles northeast of Mount Pleasant.

== Watershed ==
Little Buffalo Creek drains 17.04 square miles (44.1 km^{2}) of area, receives about 47.3 in/year of precipitation, has a wetness index of 390.20, and is about 50% forested.
