= Daniel Isenhour House and Farm =

Historic farm in North Carolina, United States

- U.S. National Register of Historic Places
- U.S. Historic district
- Location within North Carolina Location within the United States
- Location: 11970 Mt. Olive Rd., near Gold Hill, North Carolina
- Coordinates: 35°29′51″N 80°22′50″W
- Area: 73 acres (30 ha)
- Built: c. 1843
- Architectural style: Italianate, Log barn
- NRHP reference No.: 00000392
- Added to NRHP: April 21, 2000

Daniel Isenhour House and Farm is a historic home and farm and national historic district located near Gold Hill, Cabarrus County, North Carolina. The district encompasses three contributing buildings and one contributing site. The farmhouse was built about 1843, and is a two-story, frame dwelling with a one-story ell and Italianate style design elements. Also on the property are the contributing farm landscape a smokehouse (c. 1850-1875), and log barn (c. 1843-1850).

It was listed on the National Register of Historic Places in 2000.
