= Cabarrus County Public Library =

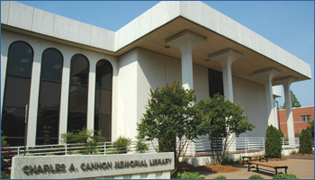
- The Concord library
- 35°24′16″N 80°36′2″W
- Location: Cabarrus County, North Carolina, USA
- Type: Public
- Established: 1902
- Branches: 6

Access and use
- Access requirements: Residence in Cabarrus County or annual fee
- Population served: approximately 200,000 citizens

Other information
- Director: Melanie Holles
- Website: www.cabarruscounty.us/library

The Cabarrus County Public Library is a department of the Cabarrus County Government in North Carolina and serves a population of nearly 200,000 individuals.

== About ==
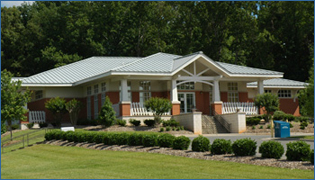
Harrisburg

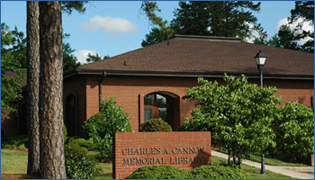
Kannapolis

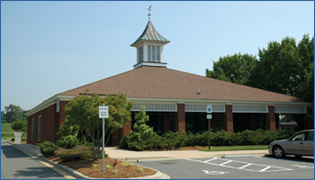
Mt. Pleasant

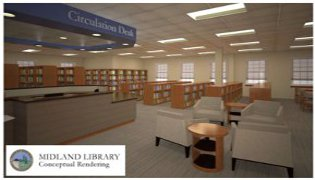
Conceptual Image of Midland

The Cabarrus County Library has locations in Concord, Harrisburg, Kannapolis, Midland, Mt. Pleasant., and the Afton Ridge neighborhood of Kannapolis.

Records show that more than one out of three citizens of the county are registered users who have access to over two hundred and fifty thousand books, magazines, audio and video materials as well as digital collections that include audio, video and book selections. The library also provides such services as educational and entertainment programming, instructional classes, children's activities and other offerings that promotes the enjoyment of reading and supports pursuit of lifelong learning.

== History ==
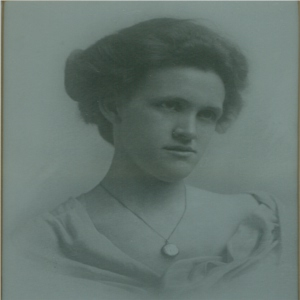
Mayfield Cole

The very first library for Cabarrus County was established on July 8, 1902 in Concord. This first library was in a small frame house located on Spring Street near the present day Coltrane-Webb elementary school. Mayfield Cole was named the first librarian with a salary of $8 per month; the library had very limited operating hours and books were acquired via donations from local citizens and it was proclaimed that the library owned a set of encyclopedias as well as a collection of Shakespeare's works. The library was governed by a board of directors that was composed of various local business men and/or their wives. This original library closed after just a year or two of being in operation.

In 1911, a second attempt at organizing a public library met with greater success. The Board of Aldermen for the city of Concord named a Board of Trustees who became the governing body for the library. Various book clubs were in existence in the community and their desire for reading material was a part of the foundation for library services in Cabarrus County. These clubs banded together to form the Concord Library Association and citizens were charged dues in order to have borrowing privileges at the library which was located on the second floor of the Phifer Building. Interest was low as the area was still mainly rural and those living in Concord were generally textile mill workers earning low wages; education and reading were low priorities for those citizens.

The library operated out of space given to them within various buildings in the city of Concord and eventually influential citizens urged the board of trustees to borrow money to buy a building dedicated solely to a library. James W. Cannon, founder of Cannon Mills gave $300 towards the purchase of a building for the library and in early 1913, the board purchased a small brick building located on South Union Street for a total cost of $3000. This building was remodeled in 1916 and included the installation of a skylight and "quiet" signs.
