= Robert Harvey Morrison Farm and Pioneer Mills Gold Mine =

Historic farm in North Carolina, United States

- U.S. National Register of Historic Places
- U.S. Historic district
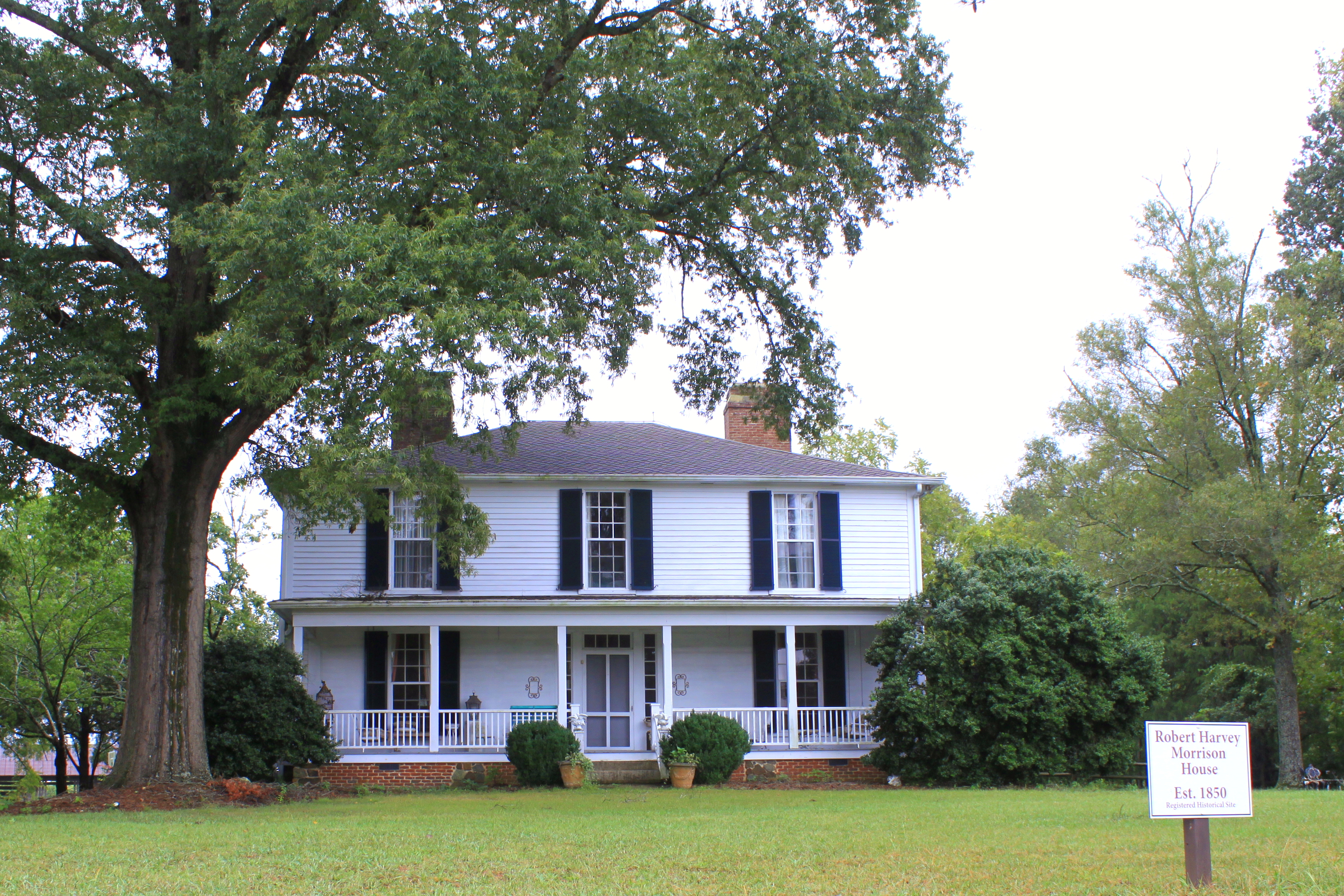
- Robert Harvey Morrison House

- Location within North Carolina Location within the United States
- Location: 730 Morrison Rd., near Midland, North Carolina
- Coordinates: 35°15′43″N 80°35′13″W
- Area: 27.7 acres (11.2 ha)
- Built: c. 1832, c. 1846, c. 1900
- Architectural style: Greek Revival
- NRHP reference No.: 90001952
- Added to NRHP: December 31, 1990

Robert Harvey Morrison Farm and Pioneer Mills Gold Mine, also known as Cedarvale, is a historic home and farm and national historic district located near Midland, Cabarrus County, North Carolina. The district encompasses five contributing buildings and three contributing sites. The house was built about 1846, and is a two-story, three-bay Greek Revival style frame dwelling. It features a full-width, one-story, hip roof porch. Also on the property are the contributing smokehouse (c. 1846), log barn (c. 1846), shed (c. 1900), shop (c. 1900), and the remains of the Pioneer Mills Gold Mine including the mine shaft site (c. 1832), ore mill site (c. 1832), and miner's cabin site (c. 1855).

It was listed on the National Register of Historic Places in 1990.
