= John Bunyan Green Farm =

Historic farm in North Carolina, United States

- U.S. National Register of Historic Places
- U.S. Historic district
- Location within North Carolina Location within the United States
- Location: SR 1114 .5 miles E of SR 1178, near Midland, North Carolina
- Coordinates: 35°12′56″N 80°29′23″W
- Area: 371.3 acres (150.3 ha)
- Built: 1880
- Architectural style: Italianate, Half-dovetail log cabin
- NRHP reference No.: 88000651
- Added to NRHP: June 2, 1988

John Bunyan Green Farm is a historic home and farm and national historic district located near Midland, Cabarrus County, North Carolina. The district encompasses 12 contributing buildings, 2 contributing sites, and 1 contributing structure. The farmhouse was built about 1880, and is a two-story, frame dwelling with Italianate style design elements. It features a two-story gabled front porch, a gable roof, and two exterior end chimneys. Also on the property are the contributing ten outbuildings, well canopy, the Garmon Mill site, the miller's house, and the fields and woods.

It was listed on the National Register of Historic Places in 1988.
