= Mill Creek (Coddle Creek tributary) =

Stream in North Carolina, USA

Mill Creek Tributary to Coddle Creek
- Location of Mill Creek mouth Mill Creek (Coddle Creek tributary) (the United States)

Location
- Country: United States
- State: North Carolina
- County: Cabarrus; Rowan

Physical characteristics
- Source: Irish Buffalo Creek divide
  - location: Enochville, North Carolina
  - coordinates: 35°32′21″N 080°40′20″W
  - elevation: 870 ft (270 m)
- Mouth: Coddle Creek
  - location: about 3 miles southwest of Kannapolis, North Carolina within Coddle Creek Reservoir
  - coordinates: 35°26′32″N 080°42′22″W
  - elevation: 646 ft (197 m)
- Length: 7.89 mi (12.70 km)
- Basin size: 8.25 square miles (21.4 km^{2})
- Discharge
  - location: Coddle Creek
  - average: 9.74 cu ft/s (0.276 m^{3}/s) at mouth with Coddle Creek

Basin features
- Progression: Coddle Creek → Rocky River → Pee Dee River → Winyah Bay → Atlantic Ocean
- River system: Pee Dee River
- Tributaries
  - left: unnamed tributaries
  - right: unnamed tributaries
- Waterbodies: Coddle Creek Reservoir
- Bridges: Enochville School Road, Smith Road, Russell Farm Road, Wright Road, Tuckaseegee Road, Mooresville Road, Stirewalt Road

Mill Creek is a 7.89 mi (12.70 km) long 1st order tributary to Coddle Creek in Cabarrus County, North Carolina.

== Course ==
Mill Creek rises in Enochville, North Carolina and then flows south to join Coddle Creek within Coddle Creek Reservoir about 3 miles southwest of Kannapolis.

== Watershed ==
Mill Creek drains 8.28 square miles (21.4 km^{2}) of area, receives about 46.7 in/year of precipitation, has a wetness index of 442.55, and is about 45% forested.
