= List of mayors of Concord, North Carolina =

Mayors of the city of Concord, North Carolina, USA

The following is a list of mayors of the city of Concord, North Carolina, USA. Concord is in Cabarrus County.

== Mayors ==
- J.S. Fisher, ca.1871
- J.N. Brown, ca.1879
- James Lee Crowell, 1892-1895
- L. McKee Morrison, ca.1896
- George W. Means, 1899-1900
- John Brice Caldwell, ca.1900-1908
- C.A. Isenhour, ca.1916
- J.B. Womble, ca.1922
- Clarence Hugh Barrier, ca.1925
- Wm. A. Wilkinson, ca.1933-1946
- Fred A. Kestler, ca.1952-1953
- Zack L. Roberts, ca.1954-1956
- S. Les Myers, 1965-1969
- Alfred M. Brown Sr., 1969-1977
- Harold B. McEachern, 1977-1981
- Bernie Edwards, ca.1993
- George W. Liles, ca.1997-1998
- J. Scott Padgett, 2001-2017
- William C. "Bill" Dusch, 2017–present

== See also ==
- Concord history
