= Ralph Ketner =

American businessperson (1920–2016)

- Born: Ralph Wright Ketner; September 20, 1920; Rimertown, North Carolina, U.S.
- Died: May 29, 2016 (aged 95); Salisbury, North Carolina, U.S.
- Education: Tri-State College
- Occupations: Founder and Chairman-emeritus of Food Lion; Philanthropist
- Spouses: Ruth Jones; Anne Blizzard (m. 1980–2016)
- Children: 2

Ralph Wright Ketner (September 20, 1920 – May 29, 2016) was an American businessman and philanthropist. He was the founder of Food Lion (which was founded as Food Town) in 1957.

== Early life ==
Ketner was born in Rimertown, North Carolina, on September 20, 1920, to parents George Robert Ketner and Effie Yost Ketner. Ketner grew up selling newspapers and almanacs, all while learning what he called "street smarts". At a young age, Ketner had an apparent aptitude for arithmetic, claiming he could "out add any adding machine." As a teenager, Ketner worked at his brother Glen Ketner's grocery store located in Kannapolis, North Carolina.

In 1937, Ketner graduated from Boyden High School and went on to attend Tri-State College (now Trine University) in Angola, Indiana, as an accounting major. He excelled in his accounting and business law classes, but ran out of money and kept dropping out of a required public speaking course. Thanks to Toastmasters, he was eventually able to cope with his fear of public speaking.

Returning home after leaving Tri-State College, he worked at Cannon Mills as an accountant, eventually rising to the position of auditor. After the Attack on Pearl Harbor in 1941, Ketner volunteered and joined the U.S. Army, serving in Africa and Europe for 36 months.

== Food Town/Food Lion ==
On December 11, 1957, Ralph Ketner, Brown Ketner, and Wilson Smith co-founded the Food Town (later Food Lion) grocery store chain in Salisbury, North Carolina. Ketner served as President (later CEO, chairman, and Chairman Emeritus).

The chain experienced high-profile problems due to a scandal involving repackaging of out-of-date and tainted meat, and unsanitary conditions.

== Personal life ==
Ketner's first marriage was to Ruth Jones with whom he had two children: Linda Ketner of Charleston, South Carolina, and Robert Ketner of Greensboro, North Carolina. His second marriage was to Anne Blizzard.

Ketner's faith was important to him and he was a member of First Presbyterian Church of Salisbury for over 83 years.

Ketner died at a hospice center in Salisbury, North Carolina, from complications of colon cancer, aged 95.

== Philanthropy ==
After retiring from Food Lion, Ketner engaged in many philanthropic activities in areas ranging from higher education, to housing, homelessness, children and hunger relief. In 1989, he provided half the funds and raised the other half necessary to build Rowan Helping Ministries first building, which was completed in 1989. On Ketner's 94th birthday, he donated $94,000 to Rowan Helping Ministries.

== Awards and honors ==
Two schools of business have been named in Ketner's honor: Ketner School of Business at Trine University, formerly Tri-State College and his alma mater; and Ketner School of Business at Catawba College, where he was Executive in Residence and provided free business consulting to students and the wider community.

In 1990, Ketner was inducted into the North Carolina Business Hall of Fame as a laureate.

In 1992, the North Carolina Chamber of Commerce, formerly known as the North Carolina Citizens for Business and Industry, bestowed Ketner with the award for Distinguished Citizenship for his "work as an outstanding entrepreneur, philanthropist, and civic volunteer."

In 2012, Ketner received the Wilson L. Smith Philanthropic Award from the Rowan Regional Medical Center Foundation (now known as the Novant Health Foundation Rowan Medical Center).

Ketner received the Ally Award from the LGBTQ advocacy group, Salisbury Pride, in 2015 and was a long time supporter of Alliance for Full Acceptance in Charleston, South Carolina.

In August 2015, North Carolina Governor Pat McCrory, a 1978 graduate of Catawba College, honored Ketner by naming him the recipient of the Order of the Long Leaf Pine, the state's highest civilian honor. This took place at the premiere of Ketner's documentary “Lessons in Leadership,” which was "produced through a partnership between Food Lion and Catawba College, documents fully the business life and philosophy of Ketner, who once presided over the fastest-growing grocery company in America."
