= Adams Creek (Dutch Buffalo Creek tributary) =

Stream in North Carolina, USA

Adams Creek Tributary to Dutch Buffalo Creek
- Location of Adams Creek mouth Adams Creek (Dutch Buffalo Creek tributary) (the United States)

Location
- Country: United States
- State: North Carolina
- County: Cabarrus

Physical characteristics
- Source: Cold Water Creek divide
  - location: about 2 miles east-southeast of New Gilead, North Carolina
  - coordinates: 35°26′43″N 080°30′36″W
  - elevation: 710 ft (220 m)
- Mouth: Dutch Buffalo Creek
  - location: about 1 mile south of Mount Pleasant, North Carolina
  - coordinates: 35°22′49″N 080°25′29″W
  - elevation: 515 ft (157 m)
- Length: 8.88 mi (14.29 km)
- Basin size: 16.86 square miles (43.7 km^{2})
- Discharge
  - location: Dutch Buffalo Creek
  - average: 19.45 cu ft/s (0.551 m^{3}/s) at mouth with Dutch Buffalo Creek

Basin features
- Progression: Dutch Buffalo Creek → Rocky River → Pee Dee River → Winyah Bay → Atlantic Ocean
- River system: Pee Dee River
- Tributaries
  - left: McAllister Creek
  - right: unnamed tributaries
- Bridges: Adams Creek Drive, Fringewood Drive, Irish Woods Drive, Ponderosa Lane, NC 73, Walker Road, NC 49-73, Mt. Pleasant Road W, Mt. Pleasant Road S

Adams Creek is a 8.88 mi (14.29 km) long 2nd order tributary to Dutch Buffalo Creek in Cabarrus County, North Carolina.

== Course ==
Adams Creek rises about 2 miles east-southeast of New Gilead, North Carolina, and then flows southeast to join Dutch Buffalo Creek about 1 mile south of Mount Pleasant.

== Watershed ==
Adams Creek drains 16.96 square miles (43.9 km^{2}) of area, receives about 47.2 in/year of precipitation, has a wetness index of 411.18, and is about 46% forested.
