= Reed Gold Mine =

Historic mine in North Carolina, United States

Coordinates: 35.28542°N 80.46996°W

- U.S. National Register of Historic Places
- U.S. National Historic Landmark District
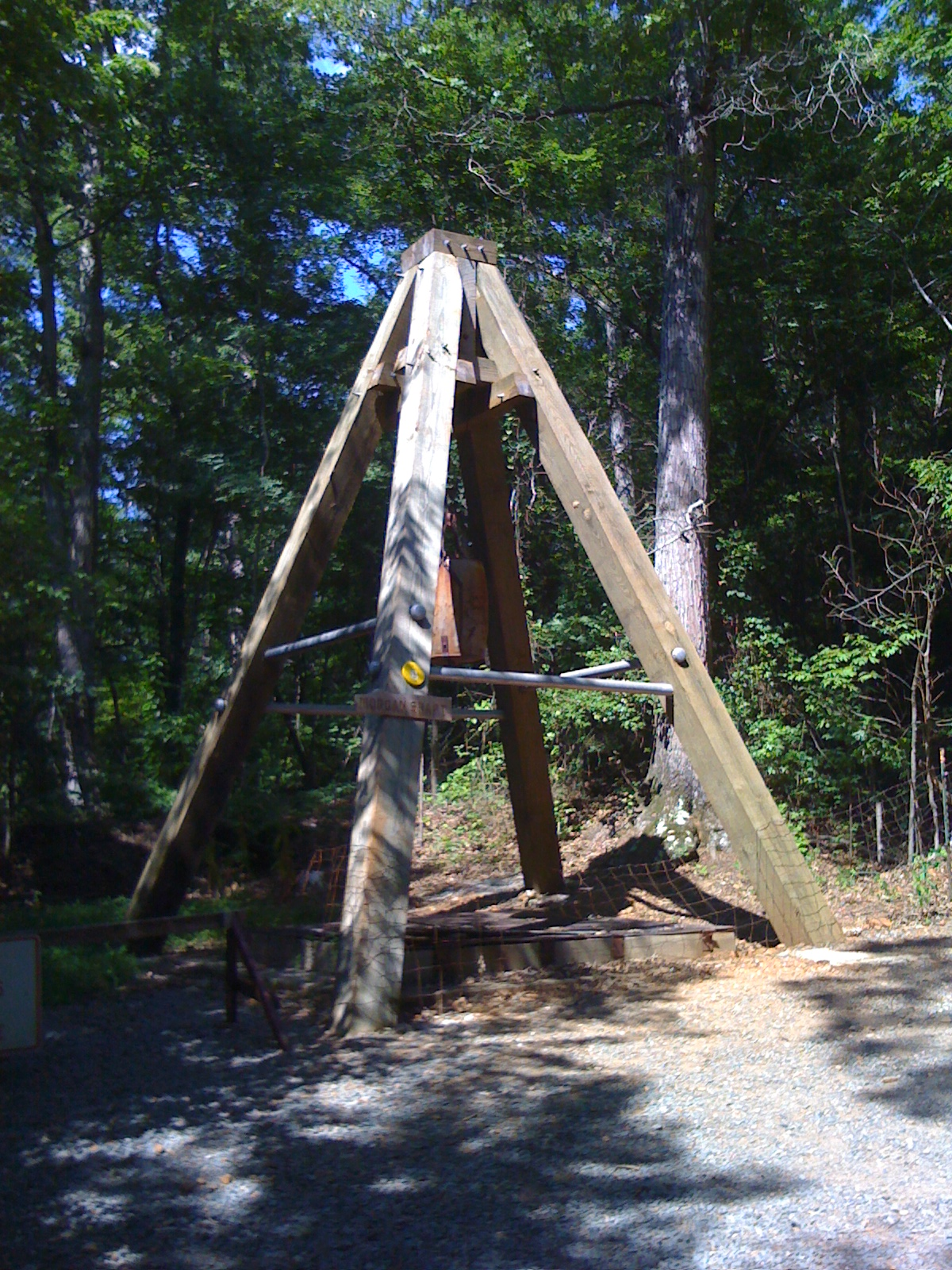

- Location within North Carolina Location within the United States
- Nearest city: Concord, North Carolina
- Built: 1799
- NRHP reference No.: 66000587
- Added to NRHP: October 15, 1966

The Reed Gold Mine is located in Midland, Cabarrus County, North Carolina, and is the site of the first documented commercial gold find in the United States. It has been designated a National Historic Landmark because of its importance and listed on the National Register of Historic Places.

== History ==
In 1799, Conrad Reed, the son of farmer and former Hessian soldier John Reed (né Johannes Reith) born June 6, 1757, found a 17-pound yellow "rock" in Little Meadow Creek on the family farm in Cabarrus County, North Carolina. For three years, the rock served as a bulky doorstop. In 1802, a jeweler from Fayetteville identified the rock as a large gold nugget. He told John Reed to name his price. Reed, not understanding the true value of gold, asked for what he thought was the hefty price of $3.50, or a week's worth of wages. The large nugget's true value was around $3,600.

About 1803, John Reed organized a small gold mining operation. Soon afterward a slave named Peter found a 28-pound nugget. Reed continued with placer mining for a number of years. In 1831 he began underground mining. John Reed died at age 88 on May 28, 1845, rich from the gold found on his property.

Some years later, the American Civil War decreased mining activity because of labor and resources being pulled into the war. The last large nugget uncovered by placer mining was discovered in 1896. The last underground mining took place at the Reed Mine in 1912. To handle the large amount of gold found in the region and state from the 19th into the early 20th century, the Charlotte Mint was built in nearby Charlotte, North Carolina.

Today, the Reed Mine is a state historic site that belongs to the North Carolina Department of Natural and Cultural Resources and open to the public. Visitors can tour a museum with extensive displays about North Carolina gold mining. In addition, they can explore several hundred feet of restored gold mine tunnels.

== See also ==
- Carolina Gold Rush
- Georgia Gold Rush
- List of National Historic Landmarks in North Carolina
- National Register of Historic Places listings in Cabarrus County, North Carolina
