= Rufus Barringer =

American politician (1821–1895)

Rufus Clay Barringer
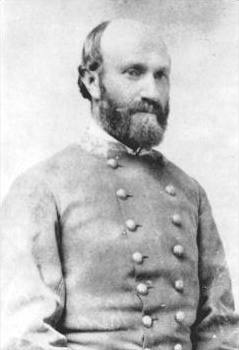
- Born: December 2, 1821; Cabarrus County, North Carolina
- Died: February 3, 1895 (aged 73); Charlotte, North Carolina
- Burial place: Elmwood Cemetery in Charlotte
- Military career
- Allegiance: Confederate States of America
- Branch: Confederate States Army
- Service years: 1861–65
- Rank: Brigadier General (CSA)
- Conflicts: American Civil War: Peninsula Campaign; Seven Days Battles; Second Battle of Bull Run; Maryland Campaign; Gettysburg campaign; Battle of Brandy Station; Battle of Namozine Church

Rufus Clay Barringer (December 2, 1821 – February 3, 1895) was an American lawyer, politician, and Confederate brigadier general during the American Civil War.

== Early life ==
Barringer was born in Cabarrus County, North Carolina, the ninth of ten children of Elizabeth Brandon and Paul Barringer. He attended the University of North Carolina at Chapel Hill, graduating in 1842. He studied law in Concord with his older brother, Daniel Moreau Barringer, who would enjoy a successful law practice and serve two terms in the U.S. House of Representatives. Their brother, Victor Clay Barringer, like Rufus later served as officer in the Confederate States Army.

Entering politics as a Whig, Barringer represented Cabarrus County in the North Carolina House of Commons from 1848 until 1850. A Unionist in his political views, he represented his district as an elector during the 1860 presidential election.

As a young man before he married, Barringer is known to have had a relationship with Roxanna Coleman, a young enslaved African-American woman held by planter Daniel Coleman Sr. Barringer fathered two mixed-race sons with her, Thomas Clay and Warren Clay. Their son Warren Clay Coleman, born into slavery in 1849, after the war became a successful businessman in Cabarrus County, in part aided by his father's influence and expertise as a lawyer. In addition to owning stores and a rental company in Concord, Coleman was a founder in 1895 of the first African-American owned and operated textile mill.

=== First two marriages ===
Barringer married Eugenia Morrison in 1854. They had two children, Paul and Anna. Eugenia died of typhoid fever in 1858. Two of her sisters also married men who became generals during the Civil War, Stonewall Jackson and Daniel Harvey Hill.

In 1861, Barringer married again, to Rosalie Chunn of Asheville, They had a son, Rufus Clay Barringer Jr. Rosalie died in 1864 during the American Civil War.

== Civil War ==
When North Carolina seceded from the Union in May 1861, Barringer's first loyalty was to his state, even though he had been opposed to secession. He raised a company of 100 horsemen, the "Cabarrus Rangers," who were designated as Company F of the 1st North Carolina Cavalry Regiment with Barringer as their captain. The regiment performed picket and scouting duty under J. E. B. Stuart during the Peninsula campaign, the Seven Days Battles, Second Manassas and the Maryland campaign in 1862. Barringer led his company during the 1863 Gettysburg campaign, where he was severely wounded in the face at the Battle of Brandy Station, an injury that took five months for his recovery. He was promoted to major for his gallantry and served in the Bristoe campaign, where he was slightly wounded on October 14, 1863. During the winter, he was promoted to lieutenant colonel and assigned temporary command of the 4th North Carolina Cavalry Regiment.

Barringer was promoted to brigadier general on June 6, 1864, and assigned command of North Carolina's cavalry brigade until his capture during the Battle of Namozine Church on April 3, 1865. After a brief interview with President Abraham Lincoln behind Union lines at City Point, Virginia, he was sent to Fort Delaware as a prisoner of war. Lincoln, a personal friend and former Congressional colleague of Barringer's brother, provided a note to Secretary of War Edwin M. Stanton asking for special treatment for Barringer in captivity. Unfortunately, Lincoln's favor backfired. After his assassination, Barringer fell under suspicion due to his brief meeting with Lincoln less than two weeks prior. He was repeatedly questioned regarding any role he may have played in the conspiracy. He wasn't released from custody until late July, months after most other Confederate prisoners had been freed. During the war, he had fought in seventy-six engagements and had suffered three separate wounds.

== Post-war ==
Barringer returned to North Carolina in August and established a law practice in Charlotte. He also owned a tenant farm and helped expand the state's railroad system.

He married again in 1870, to Margaret Long of Orange County, North Carolina. They had one son, Osmond L. Barringer (1878–1961). She also helped raise his older children.

While he mostly did not live in Concord, he is believed to have advised his son Warren Clay Coleman on his businesses and investments. He was able to see the ambitious young man succeed and become very wealthy.

Barringer was a delegate to the 1875 North Carolina Constitutional Convention. He unsuccessfully ran for lieutenant governor in 1880 as a Republican, losing to James L. Robinson. He retired from his law practice in 1884. He became a writer, completing a history of the 9th North Carolina Cavalry Regiment.

He died in 1895 and was buried in the Elmwood Cemetery in Charlotte.

== See also ==
- List of American Civil War generals (Confederate)

== Notes ==
Party political offices
Preceded by William Alexander Smith	Republican nominee for Lieutenant Governor of North Carolina; 1880	Succeeded by William T. Faircloth
