= Coleman Manufacturing Company =

Former manufacturing company

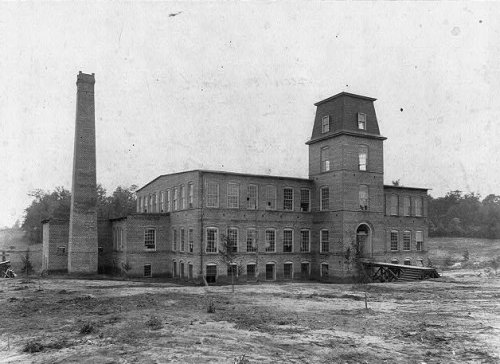
The Coleman Manufacturing building, circa 1900.

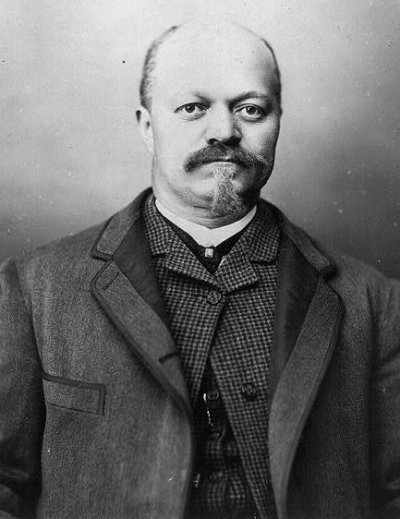
Warren C. Coleman, circa 1900.

The Coleman Manufacturing Company (1897–1904) had the first cotton mill in the United States owned and operated by African Americans. Organized in 1897 by Warren Clay Coleman and others, and operating under original leadership until 1904, it was located in the Piedmont area about two miles from the county seat of Concord, North Carolina in Cabarrus County. Textile manufacturing had been established here before the American Civil War, but the mills hired only white industrial workers. The Coleman property later became part of Franklin Cotton Mills and a Fieldcrest Cannon plant.

Photographs of the mill and a description were featured in the Negro Exhibit of the United States installation at the Paris Exposition of 1900 in France, showing African-American progress in the US. In the early 21st century, the mill building, now known as the Coleman-Franklin-Cannon Mill, houses the production facilities of Southern Grace Distilleries, Inc. It was listed on the National Register of Historic Places in 2015.

== Company established (1897) ==
The company was established in 1897 (129 years ago) in Concord, south-central Piedmont, primarily by black capitalists in North Carolina, most based in its largest city of Wilmington. To promote the economic security of people of color, they intended to establish a cotton mill to be entirely managed and operated by blacks. At the time, the cotton mills in North Carolina, and the South overall, were white owned and discriminated against black workers. Managers hired blacks only for menial positions.

Richard B. Fitzgerald, a major brickmaker and businessman of Durham, North Carolina, was the company's first president; Edward A. Johnson its first vice-president (and was later president), and Warren Clay Coleman of Concord was its first secretary, treasurer, and manager. The initial board of directors were S. C. Thompson, L. P. Berry, John C. Dancy, federal collector of customs in Wilmington; S. B. Pride, C. F. Meserve, and Robert McRae.

About $50,000 was subscribed, which soon increased to $100,000, by "several hundred" African Americans, who mainly lived in the Concord area. A few white philanthropists, such as Benjamin N. Duke, who subscribed $1,000 (at six-percent interest), also invested in the capital stock of the company. Washington Duke, a tobacco magnate, made two $10,000 loans to the company to get construction of the mill underway.

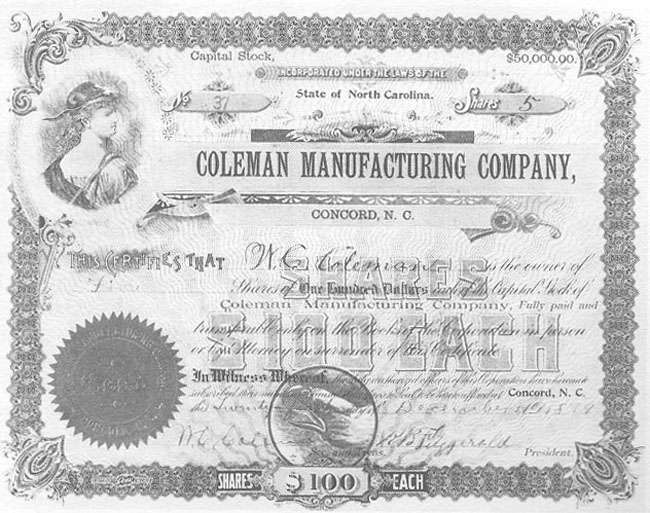
A Coleman Manufacturing Company stock certificate from 1899

The mill was to have between 7,000 and 10,000 spindles, and from 100 to 250 looms. According to their state charter, it was "allowed to spin, weave, manufacture, finish, and sell warps, yarns, cloth, prints, or other fabrics made of cotton, wool, or other material".

The mill had "a 270 horse power Corliss engine there and machinery that will compare favorable with any in or around Boston". Coleman was said to have purchased used equipment, described by one source as inefficient "second-hand English" works. This eventually caused production problems.

On February 8, 1898, the cornerstone of the 80-by-120-foot (24 m × 37 m), three-story brick building was laid "with Masonic honors." Several four-room mill houses were built by April 1900, and were rented out at about $3 per month to the workers of the mill.

Local black laborers and artisans initially accepted stock as payment for their work in construction of the mill, but most soon decided to accept only cash instead of more stock. Many workers quit due to the inability of Coleman to raise the necessary amount of cash at that time.

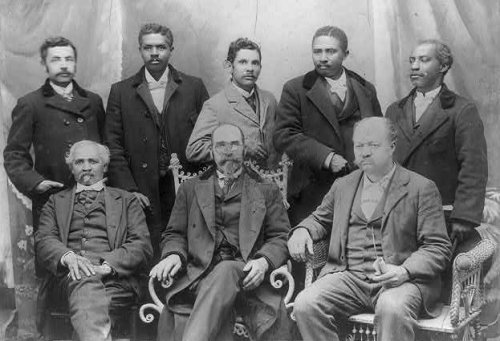
The Coleman Manufacturing Company board of directors, circa 1900.

=== Building finished (1901) ===
The mill building was finally completed in 1901. In July of that year, Coleman informed investor Washington Duke of Durham that the mill was operating successfully. Black workers were hired and had the chance to learn industrial skills. But the mill soon began to have financial problems, mostly due to the high price of cotton, which reduced profits for all manufacturers. In 1902 its operations were temporarily shut down.

=== Mill closure (1904) ===
In 1904, the company was unable to remain afloat financially, and was affected by the loss of leadership when Coleman died. Mainly due to these problems, the company officers advertised the mill for sale in July 1904. It was purchased by Washington Duke of Durham for $10,000 at the "sheriff's sale." Duke sold the property in 1906 for $13,000.

== Mill structure today ==
The original mill structure was integrated into Fieldcrest Cannon Plant #9, northeast of the intersection of Main Street and Highway 601 South in Concord.

== Legacy and honors ==
- Photographs of the mill and a description were featured in the Negro Exhibit at the Paris Exposition of 1900, in France. The exhibit was organized by American sociologist W. E. B. Du Bois.
- In 2001, the section of Highway 601 South near the mill was named "Warren C. Coleman Boulevard" in his honor.
- In 2015, the Coleman-Franklin-Cannon Mill was listed on the National Register of Historic Places for its significance as the first African-American owned and operated textile mill.
