= Intertape Polymer Group =

Canadian multinational corporation

- Formerly: Intertape
- Type: Private
- ISIN: US4606901001
- Industry: Conglomerate
- Founders: Melbourne F. Yull
- Headquarters: Sarasota, Florida, U.S.
- Area served: Worldwide
- Key people: Greg Yull (CEO)
- Revenue: ▲US$1.5 billion (2022)
- Number of employees: c. 4,200 (March 2022)
- Parent: Clearlake Capital
- Website: www.itape.com

Intertape Polymer Group Inc. is a packaging products and systems company based in Montreal and Sarasota, Florida, with 34 locations, 22 manufacturing locations in North America and one in Europe, and 4,200 employees. Products include paper-based and film-based pressure-sensitive and water-activated tape for sealing boxes and repairing plumbing. Intertape is the second-largest tape producer in North America behind 3M, and its market share for most products is 20 to 30 percent. About 80 percent of sales were made in the United States as of 2015, with ten percent in Canada and Mexico.

== History ==
Melbourne F. Yull started Intertape Polymer Group in 1981 Intertape Polymer Group incorporated August 31, 1993. in Montreal. At first Intertape sold tape in a small area, but the company grew quickly with acquisitions.

Intertape did very well in the 1990s, with the stock going from C$10 to nearly C$50. The early 2000s recession and competition from Asia hurt the company. Intertape was starting to turn around by the 2008 recession, but its stock fell to just over C$1.

Greg Yull succeeded his father in 2010. He stopped the company's practice of increasing sales by charging prices that were lower than the rising costs to make the products. He also closed inefficient plants. The company turned around. Among the plants closed were Brantford, Ontario in 2011 and Richmond, Kentucky in 2012. Also, shrink film production moved from the Truro, Nova Scotia plant moved to Tremonton, Utah in 2012.

Yull announced on July 3, 2013, that after 16 years in Bradenton, Florida, the company had selected a new site because it needed more room. After an eight-month search, in August 2013, Intertape moved its U.S. headquarters to Osprey Commerce Center in Sarasota. The offices once belonged to Arthur Andersen LLP, and the street was called Arthur Andersen Boulevard. The company would only move to the Sarasota location if the street name was changed. The street became Paramount Drive.

In a deal announced in April 2015, Intertape bought Better Packages Inc. of Ansonia, Connecticut, a company started in 1917 that made tape dispensers. In an $11 million deal announced in November 2015, Intertape bought RJM Manufacturing Inc. of Fairless Hills, Pennsylvania, which made TaraTape filament and pressure-sensitive tapes.

In February 2016, Intertape announced that by 2017 it would build a $40 million plant on 33 acres in Midland, North Carolina for water-activated tape, which the company made in Menasha, Wisconsin; the Menasha plant would remain open. Yull announced a $13.5 million expansion in October 2017. On July 1, 2017, IPG completed acquisition of Canadian Technical Tape Ltd. (Cantech), a very successful North American brand, supplier of industrial and specialty tapes based in Montreal, Canada.

In June 2022, the company was de-listed from the Toronto Stock Exchange with all shares being purchased by private equity firm Clearlake Capital Group.

== List of brands ==
Brand	Year founded	Year acquired	Website				
Brand	Year founded	Year acquired	Website	Cantech	1950	2017, Q3	—N/a
PolyAir	—N/a	2018, Q3	—N/a				
Capstone	—N/a	2017, Q2	—N/a				
Maiweave	—N/a	2018, Q4	—N/a				
Better Packages	—N/a	2015, Q2	www.betterpackages.com				
Nortech Packaging	—N/a	2020, Q1	—N/a				
Nuevopak	—N/a	2021, Q2	—N/a				

== Locations ==
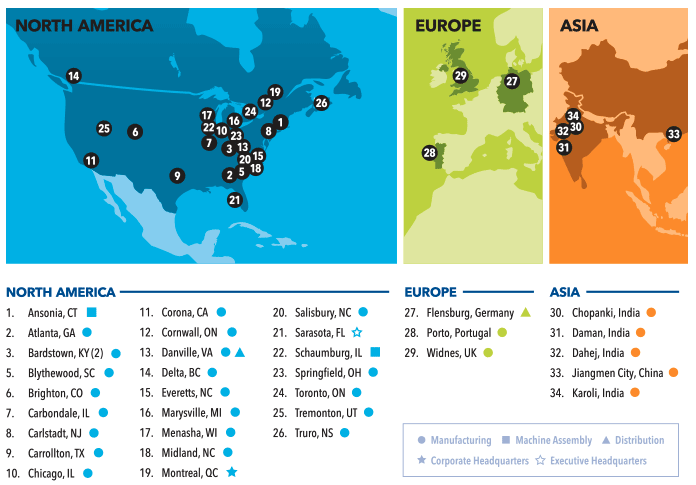
Intertape Polymer Group's Locations c. 2022

- Ansonia, Connecticut
- Atlanta, Georgia
- Bardstown, Kentucky
- Blythewood, South Carolina
- Brighton, Colorado
- Carlstadt, New Jersey
- Carrollton, Texas
- Chicago, Illinois
- Chopanki, India
- Cornwall, Ontario, Canada
- Dahej, India
- Daman, India
- Danville, Virginia
- Delta, British Columbia, Canada
- Everetts, North Carolina
- Flensburg, Germany
- Jiangmen City, China
- Karoli, Bhiwadi, Rajasthan, India
- Marysville, Michigan
- Menasha, Wisconsin
- Midland, North Carolina
- Montreal, Quebec, Canada
- Porto, Portugal
- Salisbury, North Carolina
- Sarasota, Florida
- Schaumburg, Illinois
- Springfield, Ohio
- Toronto, Ontario, Canada
- Tremonton, Utah
- Truro, Nova Scotia, Canada
- Widnes, United Kingdom
