= Jennie Wolf Creek =

Stream in North Carolina, USA

Jennie Wolf Creek Tributary to Dutch Buffalo Creek
- Location of Jennie Wolf Creek mouth Jennie Wolf Creek (the United States)

Location
- Country: United States
- State: North Carolina
- County: Cabarrus; Rowan

Physical characteristics
- Source: Second Creek divide
  - location: about 2 miles south-southeast of Shupings Mill, North Carolina
  - coordinates: 35°31′38″N 080°21′20″W
  - elevation: 780 ft (240 m)
- Mouth: Dutch Buffalo Creek
  - location: about 2 miles south of Watts Crossroads, North Carolina
  - coordinates: 35°26′31″N 080°27′17″W
  - elevation: 598 ft (182 m)
- Length: 6.67 mi (10.73 km)
- Basin size: 8.98 square miles (23.3 km^{2})
- Discharge
  - location: Dutch Buffalo Creek
  - average: 9.98 cu ft/s (0.283 m^{3}/s) at mouth with Dutch Buffalo Creek

Basin features
- Progression: Dutch Buffalo Creek → Rocky River → Pee Dee River → Winyah Bay → Atlantic Ocean
- River system: Pee Dee River
- Tributaries
  - left: unnamed tributaries
  - right: unnamed tributaries
- Bridges: Graystone Road, Sisk-Carter Road, Kluttz Road, Gold Hill Road

Jennie Wolf Creek is a 6.67 mi (10.73 km) long 2nd order tributary to Dutch Buffalo Creek in Cabarrus County, North Carolina. This is the only stream of this name in the United States.

== Variant names ==
According to the Geographic Names Information System, it has also been known historically as:

- Schene Wolf Creek

== Course ==
Jennie Wolf Creek rises about 2 miles south-southeast of Shupings Mill, North Carolina in Rowan County, and then flows south-southeast into Cabarrus County to join Dutch Buffalo Creek about 2 miles south of Watts Crossroads.

== Watershed ==
Jennie Wolf Creek drains 8.98 square miles (23.3 km^{2}) of area, receives about 46.9 in/year of precipitation, has a wetness index of 435.87, and is about 54% forested.
