= Daniel Moreau Barringer =

American politician (1806–1873)

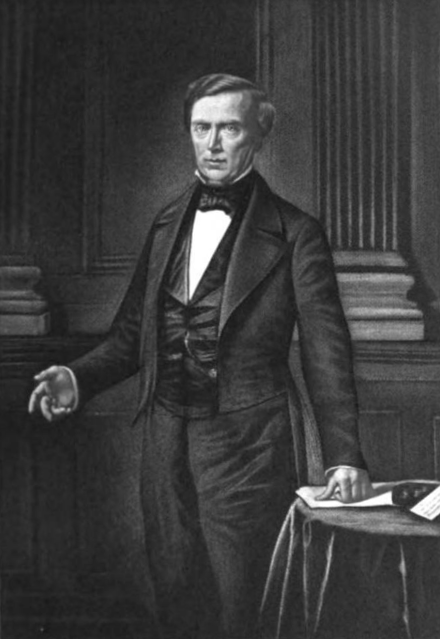

Chair of the North Carolina Democratic-Conservative Party
- In office 1872

Member of the North Carolina House of Commons from Cabarrus County
- In office November 20, 1854 – February 16, 1855
- Preceded by: John Shimpock, William S. Harris
- Succeeded by: Caleb N. White
- In office November 16, 1840 – January 28, 1843
- Preceded by: Daniel Boger
- Succeeded by: Caleb Phifer, Thomas H. Robinson
- In office November 16, 1829 – January 10, 1835
- Preceded by: J.C. Barnhardt
- Succeeded by: Levi Hope, George Barnhardt

12th United States Minister to Spain
- In office October 24, 1849 – September 4, 1853
- President: Zachary Taylor; Millard Fillmore; Franklin Pierce
- Preceded by: Romulus M. Saunders
- Succeeded by: Pierre Soule

Member of the U.S. House of Representatives from North Carolina
- In office March 4, 1843 – March 3, 1849
- Preceded by: John Daniel
- Succeeded by: Edmund Deberry
- Constituency: 2nd district (1843–1847); 3rd district (1847–1849)

Personal details
- Born: July 30, 1806 Cabarrus County, North Carolina, U.S.
- Died: September 1, 1873 (aged 67) White Sulphur Springs, West Virginia, U.S.
- Resting place: Greenmount Cemetery
- Party: Whig; Democratic
- Spouse: Elizabeth Wethered (m. 1848; died 1867)
- Parents: Paul Barringer; Elizabeth Brandon
- Relatives: Daniel Laurens Barringer (paternal uncle); Rufus Barringer (brother)
- Education: University of North Carolina

Daniel Moreau Barringer (July 30, 1806 – September 1, 1873) was a slave owner and Whig U.S. Congressman from North Carolina between 1843 and 1849. He joined the Democratic Party by the early 1870s.

== Early life and education ==
Born near Concord, North Carolina, in 1806 to Elizabeth Brandon and Paul Barringer, Daniel had nine siblings, including at least two brothers. His grandfather, John Paul Barringer, was a German who immigrated to Pennsylvania in 1743. Raised in a large family, Barringer likely received early education at home before attending the University of North Carolina at Chapel Hill. After graduating in 1826, he pursued legal studies in Hillsborough with an established firm, and was admitted to the bar.

== Career ==
Upon returning to his hometown of Concord in 1829, Barringer established a law practice and embarked on a political career. In the same year, he was elected to the North Carolina House of Commons, beginning a tenure that lasted until 1834. Barringer was re-elected for further terms in 1840 and 1842. Additionally, he served as a member of the 1835 North Carolina constitutional convention, demonstrating his commitment to public service and governance.

In 1842, Barringer was elected as a Whig to the 28th United States Congress. He was reelected to the 29th and 30th sessions. During the 30th Congress, he chaired the Committee on Indian Affairs and the Committee on Expenditures in the Department of State. He became a personal friend of fellow congressman Abraham Lincoln. During this period, his younger brother, Rufus Clay Barringer, studied law with him to prepare for passing the bar exam. The younger Barringer set up a practice in their hometown of Concord, North Carolina, and also entered politics in the state.

After opting not to seek a fourth congressional term in 1848, Daniel Barringer accepted President Zachary Taylor's appointment as minister to Spain, serving in this diplomatic capacity from 1849 to 1853. Following his return to North Carolina in 1854, Barringer resumed his political career and was elected to another term in the House of Commons.

At the outbreak of the American Civil War, Barringer was a delegate to the 1861 Peace Convention held in Washington, D.C. After the American Civil War, he was a participant in the Union National Convention of 1866, an effort by numerous politicians to gather support for President Andrew Johnson.

Barringer became a Democrat. He chaired the North Carolina Democratic Party in 1872, taking over after the death of Thomas Bragg. Barringer died September 1, 1873, aged 67, in White Sulphur Springs, West Virginia, and was buried in Greenmount Cemetery in Baltimore, Maryland.

Barringer was the older brother of Civil War cavalry Brigadier General Rufus Barringer. They were sons of General Paul Barringer, and nephews of Daniel Laurens Barringer, who had previously been a Congressman from North Carolina. Barringer's son, Daniel Barringer, became famous for proving the meteoritic origins of the Meteor Crater in Arizona.

== Sources ==
U.S. House of Representatives
Preceded by John Daniel	Member of the U.S. House of Representatives from North Carolina's 2nd congressional district 1843–1847	Succeeded by Nathaniel Boyden
Preceded by David S. Reid	Member of the U.S. House of Representatives from North Carolina's 3rd congressional district 1847–1849	Succeeded by Edmund Deberry
Diplomatic posts
Preceded by Romulus M. Saunders	U.S. Minister to Spain; 1849–1853	Succeeded by Pierre Soulé
