= Warren Clay Coleman =

African-American businessman (1849–1904)

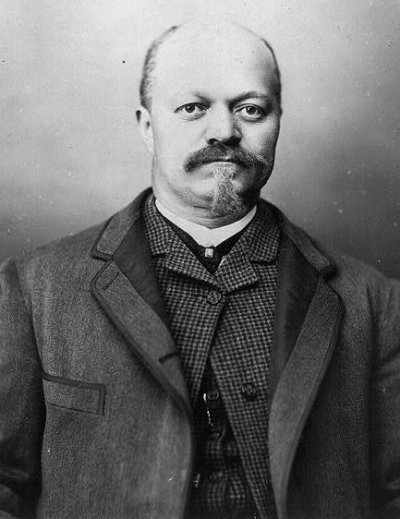
- Born: May 25, 1849; Cabarrus County, North Carolina, U.S.
- Died: May 24, 1904 (aged 54); Cabarrus County, U.S.
- Occupation: Businessman
- Known for: Founder of Coleman Manufacturing Company

Warren Clay Coleman (May 25, 1849 – May 24, 1904) was an African-American businessman in south-central North Carolina known as a founder of the Coleman Manufacturing Company, which built one of the first black-owned and operated textile mills in the United States. The Coleman-Franklin-Cannon Mill still stands in Concord, North Carolina, and was listed on the National Register of Historic Places in 2015.

Born into slavery, Coleman learned shoemaking and barbering before he came of age as a freedman. He had a white attorney father who took an interest in him, and Coleman made use of his contacts and became known as a highly successful entrepreneur in and around Concord, North Carolina. He developed a substantial general store and other retail outlets, bought land, and developed and rented residential real estate, owned farms in several areas, and had other businesses in addition to the mill. In 1900 Coleman was the wealthiest man of color in the state.

== Early life ==
Coleman was born into slavery in 1849 in Cabarrus County, North Carolina. His mother, Roxanna Coleman, was of mixed race and owned by planter Daniel Coleman, Sr. and his wife Mary (Mahan) Coleman; she took their surname. His white father was Rufus Clay Barringer (1821–1895), then a young, unmarried attorney whose family lived near the Colemans. Barringer became a politician, and later a Confederate general during the American Civil War. Warren and his older brother Thomas Clay, were both fathered by Barringer before the attorney married in 1854. Their mother had another illegitimate son, Joseph Smith, after breaking with Barringer. (Their father Barringer married three times - two wives died young - and had a total of three sons and a daughter from these marriages.)

Coleman's mother married John F. Young, an enslaved skilled blacksmith who was owned by another owner nearby. Generally the master of a slave husband would buy the wife so the family could be united on one plantation. But Daniel Coleman bought Young, who lived with his wife Roxanna and her children at his plantation.

Warren Coleman is believed to have learned shoemaking and barbering skills while a youth on the Coleman plantation, both of which were considered good trades in those years. He later used these skills in his work for the Confederate Army as a boot and shoe maker. (White men who had mixed-race sons sometimes tried to prepare them through apprenticeships for such trades, by which they could support themselves as free men.)

== Career ==
After the war, Warren Coleman was freed but bound in a two-year apprenticeship indenture to William M. Coleman until he came of age in 1867. (Coleman was a planter-lawyer in Cabarrus County, who later became the state attorney general, and he served as a patron of the younger man.) After that, Coleman moved to Alabama, seeking economic opportunities.

He returned to Cabarrus County the next year, and established his first business; collecting rags, bones, and junk for resale and disposal. In 1873–1874, he went to Washington, DC, where he attended the Model School at Howard University to learn more about business, a period of study supported by William Coleman.

After his return to Concord, Coleman was likely aided by his father Barringer, who had a law practice in Concord and Charlotte until 1871, and likely also by William Coleman. For instance, the younger Coleman bought land from the Barringer family. Over the next 25 years, Warren Clay Coleman became one of the richest merchants of color in the state.

His first land purchase was a 130-acre wooded farm in Cabarrus. His business ventures later expanded to include a mercantile store located on Main Street in Concord, the county seat. In 1873, he married Jane E. Jones of Alabama in Cabarrus County.

He also started a grocery store, specializing in teas, coffee, sugar, syrups, molasses, cakes, and candies. In 1879 Coleman combined his two stores, and his general store became one of the city's major shops. He built inexpensive worker housing for more than 100 rental houses in the African-American section of town over the following decades, and a residential rental company to manage them. They housed the numerous migrants to Concord from rural areas. Coleman's status as the son of Rufus Clay Barringer, who took an interest and advised the ambitious young man, and the relationships he established with other influential whites, are thought to have helped his making these initial investments.

In the 1890s Coleman worked with black capitalists, African-American educator Booker T. Washington, and prominent white leaders, especially Washington Duke of Durham, North Carolina, to organize and build the nation's first African-American owned and operated textile factory. At the time, blacks were generally excluded as textile workers from white-owned mills, and Coleman and his partners wanted to create industrial opportunity for the black community. The company was incorporated in 1895/1896 and chartered by the state.

At the height of its operations, the Coleman Manufacturing Company employed more than 300 African-American workers in a 96,000-square foot three-story brick building. It had assets worth $100,000. Because of an increase in cotton prices and other factors, the mill struggled financially and was closed after Coleman's death in 1904. It was sold to other parties.

Although the mill passed out of black ownership after Coleman's death, its operation with black workers opened doors for others. Superior Court Judge Clarence Horton of Cabarrus County has noted that when a hosiery factory opened in 1913, it employed black seamstresses and other workers, unlike many white-owned mills in the South.

In 1900 Coleman was the richest person of color in the county and state. Historian Norman J. McCullough Sr., who is working on a biography of the businessman, contends he was the richest African American in the country, noting that other black men became millionaires after 1900. Coleman owned property along Concord's Depot Street (now Cabarrus Avenue) and on Lincoln and Spring streets.

He established a church called Price Temple so that people working for him could have a church close by. He also donated money to other black churches: Rock Hill and Zion Hill AME Zion churches in Concord.

To encourage education among African Americans, Coleman subsidized tuition for students at Howard University, Livingstone College, and Shaw University, all historically black colleges. He also helped support the African-American orphanage in Oxford, North Carolina.

== Legacy ==
Today the mill is owned by Bill Bryant, who ran a large printing operation here for a time. He leases much of the mill to smaller businesses: several specialty auto body and auto parts shops, a pool company, and a distillery for "moonshine".

- In 2001, the section of Highway 601 South near the mill was named "Warren C. Coleman Boulevard" in his honor.
- In 2015, the Coleman-Franklin-Cannon Mill was listed on the National Register of Historic Places.
- In 2018, Price Memorial AME Zion Church held its first annual W.C. Coleman Day Street Festival, to honor the businessman and help continue this church.
