= Dutch Buffalo Creek =

Stream in North Carolina, USA

Dutch Buffalo Creek Tributary to Rocky River
- Location of Dutch Buffalo Creek mouth Dutch Buffalo Creek (the United States)

Location
- Country: United States
- State: North Carolina
- County: Cabarrus; Rowan

Physical characteristics
- Source: Crane Creek divide
  - location: Bostain Heights, North Carolina
  - coordinates: 35°33′24″N 080°30′28″W
  - elevation: 810 ft (250 m)
- Mouth: Rocky River
  - location: about 0.25 miles southwest of Georgeville, North Carolina
  - coordinates: 35°18′30″N 080°28′00″W
  - elevation: 468 ft (143 m)
- Length: 25.16 mi (40.49 km)
- Basin size: 98.68 square miles (255.6 km^{2})
- Discharge
  - location: Rocky River
  - average: 106.87 cu ft/s (3.026 m^{3}/s) at mouth with Rocky River

Basin features
- Progression: Rocky River → Pee Dee River → Winyah Bay → Atlantic Ocean
- River system: Pee Dee River
- Tributaries
  - left: Jennie Wolf Creek; Black Run Creek; Little Buffalo Creek
  - right: Lick Branch; Adams Creek
- Bridges: Paulownia Drive, Rogers Road, Old Beatty Ford Road, Sapp Road, Barrier Road, Gold Hill Road, Cline School Road, Mt Pleasant Road, Mt Olive Road, NC 49, NC 73, Bowman-Barrier Road, Barrier Store Road, Miami Church Road, NC 200

Dutch Buffalo Creek is a 25.16 mi (40.49 km) long 4th order tributary to the Rocky River in Cabarrus County, North Carolina. This is the only stream of this name in the United States.

== Variant names ==
According to the Geographic Names Information System, it has also been known historically as:

- Dutch Buffaloe Creek

== Course ==
Dutch Buffalo Creek rises in Bostian Heights, North Carolina in Rowan County, and then flows southeast into Cabarrus County and then turns south-southwest to join the Rocky River about 0.25 miles southwest of Georgeville.

== Watershed ==
Dutch Buffalo Creek drains 98.68 square miles (255.6 km^{2}) of area, receives about 47.1 in/year of precipitation, has a wetness index of 416.58, and is about 48% forested.
