= Coddle Creek =

Stream in North Carolina, US

Coddle Creek Tributary to Rocky River
- Location of Coddle Creek mouth

Location
- Country: United States
- State: North Carolina
- Counties: Cabarrus; Iredell

Physical characteristics
- Source: divide between Coddle Creek and Yadkin River
  - location: Mooresville, North Carolina
  - coordinates: 35°35′51″N 080°46′03″W
  - elevation: 860 ft (260 m)
- Mouth: Rocky River
  - location: about 2 miles east of Harrisburg, North Carolina
  - coordinates: 35°19′30″N 080°35′51″W
  - elevation: 530 ft (160 m)
- Length: 27.1 mi (43.6 km)
- Basin size: 79.14 square miles (205.0 km^{2})
- Discharge
  - location: Rocky River
  - average: 85.14 cu ft/s (2.411 m^{3}/s) at mouth with Rocky River

Basin features
- Progression: Rocky River → Pee Dee River → Winyah Bay → Atlantic Ocean
- River system: Pee Dee River
- Tributaries
  - left: East Fork; Park Creek; Mill Creek; Afton Run; Wolf Meadow Branch
  - right: Emerson Branch

Coddle Creek is a stream/river that rises near Mooresville in Iredell County, North Carolina. It flows through most of northwestern Cabarrus County, North Carolina, where it empties into Rocky River near Harrisburg, North Carolina.
