= Black Run Creek =

Stream in North Carolina, USA

Black Run Creek Tributary to Dutch Buffalo Creek
- Location of Black Run Creek mouth Black Run Creek (the United States)

Location
- Country: United States
- State: North Carolina
- County: Cabarrus

Physical characteristics
- Source: Second Creek divide
  - location: about 4 miles northeast of Watts Crossroads, North Carolina
  - coordinates: 35°30′07″N 080°25′24″W
  - elevation: 770 ft (230 m)
- Mouth: Dutch Buffalo Creek
  - location: about 2 miles north of Mount Pleasant, North Carolina
  - coordinates: 35°26′21″N 080°26′20″W
  - elevation: 562 ft (171 m)
- Length: 5.12 mi (8.24 km)
- Basin size: 6.05 square miles (15.7 km^{2})
- Discharge
  - location: Dutch Buffalo Creek
  - average: 7.35 cu ft/s (0.208 m^{3}/s) at mouth with Dutch Buffalo Creek

Basin features
- Progression: Dutch Buffalo Creek → Rocky River → Pee Dee River → Winyah Bay → Atlantic Ocean
- River system: Pee Dee River
- Tributaries
  - left: unnamed tributaries
  - right: unnamed tributaries
- Bridges: Kluttz Road, Haystack Drive, Gold Hill Road

Black Run Creek is a 5.12 mi (8.24 km) long first order tributary to Dutch Buffalo Creek in Cabarrus County, North Carolina.

== Course ==
Black Run Creek rises about 4 miles northeast of Watts Crossroads, North Carolina, and then follows a southerly course to join Dutch Buffalo Creek about 2 miles north of Mount Pleasant.

== Watershed ==
Black Run Creek drains 6.05 square miles (15.7 km^{2}) of area, receives about 47.1 in/year of precipitation, has a wetness index of 433.00, and is about 43% forested.
