= Gold Hill, North Carolina =

- Census-designated place
- Location within North Carolina Location within the United States
- Coordinates: 35°31′31″N 80°20′43″W
- Country: United States
- State: North Carolina
- County: Rowan

Area
  - Total: 2.51 sq mi (6.49 km^{2})
  - Land: 2.49 sq mi (6.44 km^{2})
  - Water: 0.019 sq mi (0.05 km^{2})
- Elevation: 761 ft (232 m)

Population (2020)
  - Total: 372
  - Density: 149.5/sq mi (57.73/km^{2})
- Time zone: UTC-5 (Eastern (EST))
  - Summer (DST): UTC-4 (EDT)
- ZIP code: 28071
- Area codes: 704 and 980
- GNIS feature ID: 2812801

Gold Hill is an unincorporated community and census-designated place (CDP) in southeastern Rowan County, North Carolina, United States, near the Cabarrus County line. It was first listed as a CDP in the 2020 census with a population of 372. It is situated near the Yadkin River and is served by U.S. Highway 52 and Old Beatty Ford Road.

== Mining ==
Gold was first discovered in what would become the town of Gold Hill in southeastern Rowan County in 1824. $6 million in gold was mined here prior to the Civil War and a mint was located in Charlotte as a result. In the 1840s, Gold Hill was "a raucous mining camp town with a considerable number of saloons and brothels." The Barnhardt shaft, named for Col. George Barnhardt of the Reed Mine (NC State Historic Site) family, was opened in 1842 and reached a depth of 435 feet. The Earnhardt/Randolph Mine Shaft was opened in 1843 across the street from the Barnhardt Mine and reached a depth of 850 feet becoming the deepest gold mine in the United States. The Barnhardt and Randolph mines together were described as "the richest and most productive gold mines east of the Mississippi". Gold Hill was incorporated in 1843 and had a population of 3000 people and a total of 23 mines in the Gold Hill Mining District. The California Gold Rush and the American Civil War significantly reduced the mining activity. Although some mining occurred in the years following the Civil War a greater resurgence of mining began with the purchase of the Gold Hill Mines and the establishment of 'The New Gold Hill Mining Company' based in London, England. Considerable profits were realized with gold being shipped to England during the period of 1880-1900. Production came to an end by 1915.

== Tourist attraction ==
The town's first Founders' Day, which was not called by that name, took place in 1989 and was not intended to become an annual event, but it ended up being so popular that a steering committee was formed for the purpose of starting a foundation to find and preserve the town's heritage. The Historic Gold Hill and Mines Foundation, Inc. began in 1992, and that year, a second Founders' Day took place. Gold Hill Mines Historic Park began with a donation of 16 acres by Billie Johnson and was dedicated in 1993; by the 25th Founders' Day it was 70 acres. Founders' Day became an annual event on the fourth Saturday in September, and they were moved from the fire department to the park located at 735 St. Stephens Church Road.

E.H. Montgomery General Store, Mauney’s Store, the jail and a rock wall date back to the 1840s. Several buildings were moved to and restored for what has been described as a "re-creation" of a historic village. A gas station built in 1928 was moved from U.S. 52 in 1998. The File Store from Craven, North Carolina near Salisbury was built in 1906 and moved to Gold Hill in 2001. A miner's cabin was moved to Gold Hill in 2011 and became a bakery.

The Daniel Isenhour House and Farm was listed on the National Register of Historic Places in 2000.

== Demographics ==
Historical population
| Census | Pop. | Note | %± |
|---|---|---|---|
| 2020 | 372 | | — |
U.S. Decennial Census; 2020

=== 2020 census ===
Gold Hill CDP, North Carolina – Demographic Profile (NH = Non-Hispanic)
| Race / Ethnicity | Pop 2020 | % 2020 |
|---|---|---|
| White alone (NH) | 333 | 89.52% |
| Black or African American alone (NH) | 2 | 0.54% |
| Native American or Alaska Native alone (NH) | 7 | 1.88% |
| Asian alone (NH) | 0 | 0.00% |
| Pacific Islander alone (NH) | 0 | 0.00% |
| Some Other Race alone (NH) | 0 | 0.00% |
| Mixed Race/Multi-Racial (NH) | 22 | 5.91% |
| Hispanic or Latino (any race) | 8 | 2.15% |
| Total | 372 | 100.00% |

Note: the US Census treats Hispanic/Latino as an ethnic category. This table excludes Latinos from the racial categories and assigns them to a separate category. Hispanics/Latinos can be of any race.
