= Coleman-Franklin-Cannon Mill =

Historic industrial complex in North Carolina, US

- U.S. National Register of Historic Places
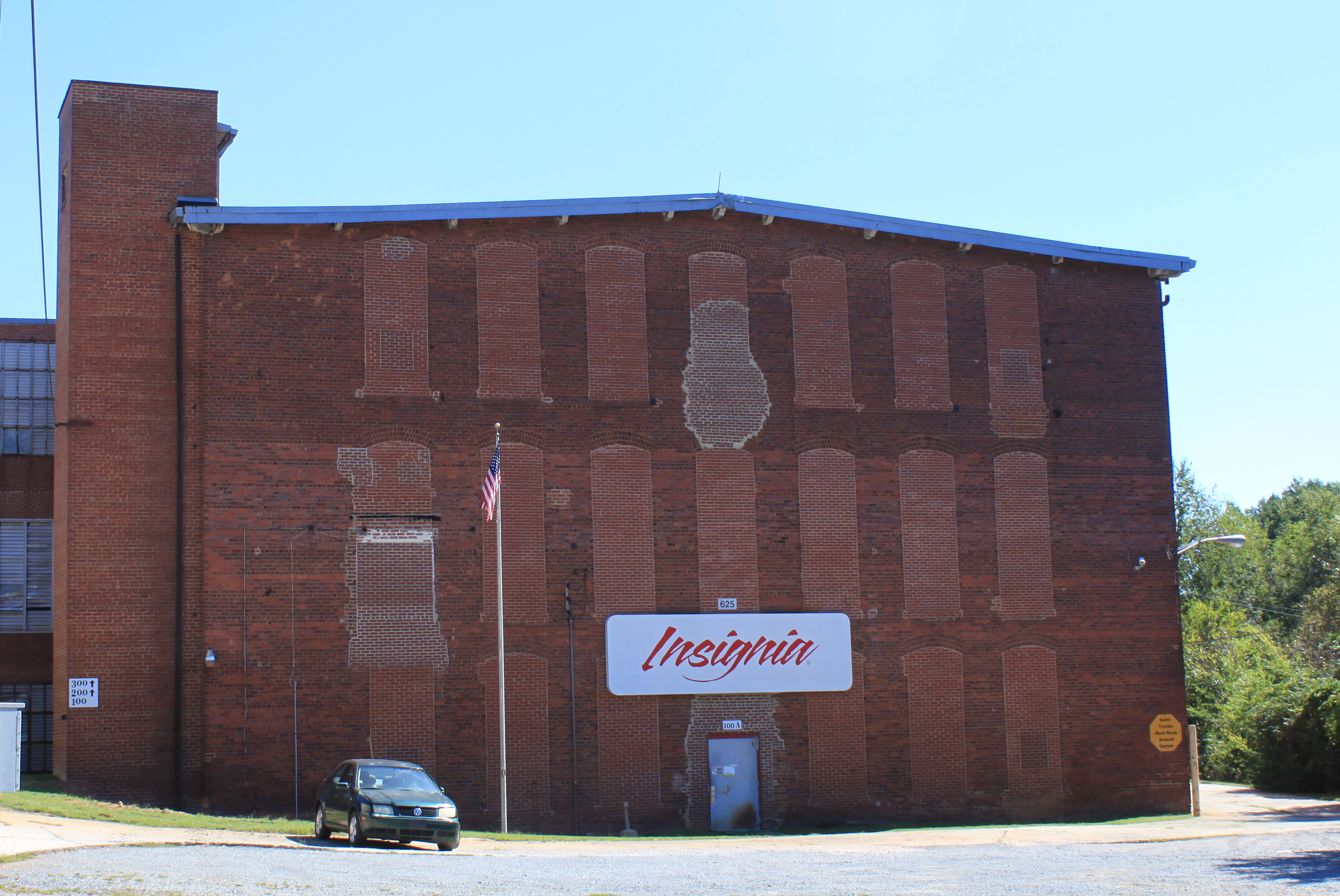

- Location within North Carolina Location within the United States
- Location: 625 Main St., SW; Concord, North Carolina
- Coordinates: 35°23′14″N 80°35′24″W
- Area: 6.6 acres (2.7 ha)
- Built: 1898
- Architectural style: Early commercial
- NRHP reference No.: 15000161
- Added to NRHP: April 16, 2015

The Coleman-Franklin-Cannon Mill is a historic industrial complex at 625 Main Street SW in Concord, North Carolina. The recognized complex consists of ten buildings on 6.6 acres (2.7 ha), about 2 miles (3.2 km) west of downtown Concord. Another 4.4 acres are not included. The oldest portion of the mill, now its eastern section, is a brick two-story structure 14 bays long and 9 deep. The historic site also includes some worker housing.

The mill was built in 1898 by the Coleman Manufacturing Company, owned by Warren Clay Coleman, an African-American businessman of Concord, with a nine-man board made up of seven other African-American partners and one white. He needed more investment when nationwide subscriptions to purchase stock fell short. Washington Duke, a white tobacco magnate from Durham, contributed $1000, and made two $10,000 loans, which aided the company in constructing the mill and beginning operations.

Coleman hired white contractors and African-American crews. Builder Adolphus Henry Propst and brick maker and mason Rufus A. Brown led these crews in the construction. At one point Coleman paid the workers in stock in the company, but they demanded cash to finish the project.

Coleman announced that he would hire only African-American workers, and sparked a national discussion. The New York Times suggested that he might open the door for the hiring of more African Americans in the textile industry, where mill workers were generally restricted to whites. Some people worried that this would depress wages for whites, as blacks were paid less. Others were more worried about potential child labor laws under discussion.

Coleman was under-capitalized and struggled financially in an economic depression, at a time when all mill owners faced rising prices of cotton. Coleman's death in 1904 further weakened his company.

Benjamin Duke initially bought the mill because of outstanding debt. Later it was sold and used by other textile companies. Franklin Cotton Mills made changes and additions in 1912 that doubled it in size, adding on to the west side and removing the west 1898 wall to make interior passage unimpeded. Other alterations and additions were made through the 1960s, sometimes for structural reasons.

In the late 20th century, the mill was owned by Fieldcrest-Cannon, the last textile company to own it. During this period, major textile companies moved their jobs offshore to get cheaper labor costs, and the textile industry in the South virtually disappeared. In the 21st century the mill was sold; it has been adapted as a production facility for moonshine.

The property was listed on the National Register of Historic Places in 2015.

The building housed North Carolina distillery Southern Grace Distillers, Inc., from 2014 to 2016.

== See also ==
- National Register of Historic Places listings in Cabarrus County, North Carolina
