= Bethel Church Arbor =

Historic church in North Carolina, United States

- U.S. National Register of Historic Places
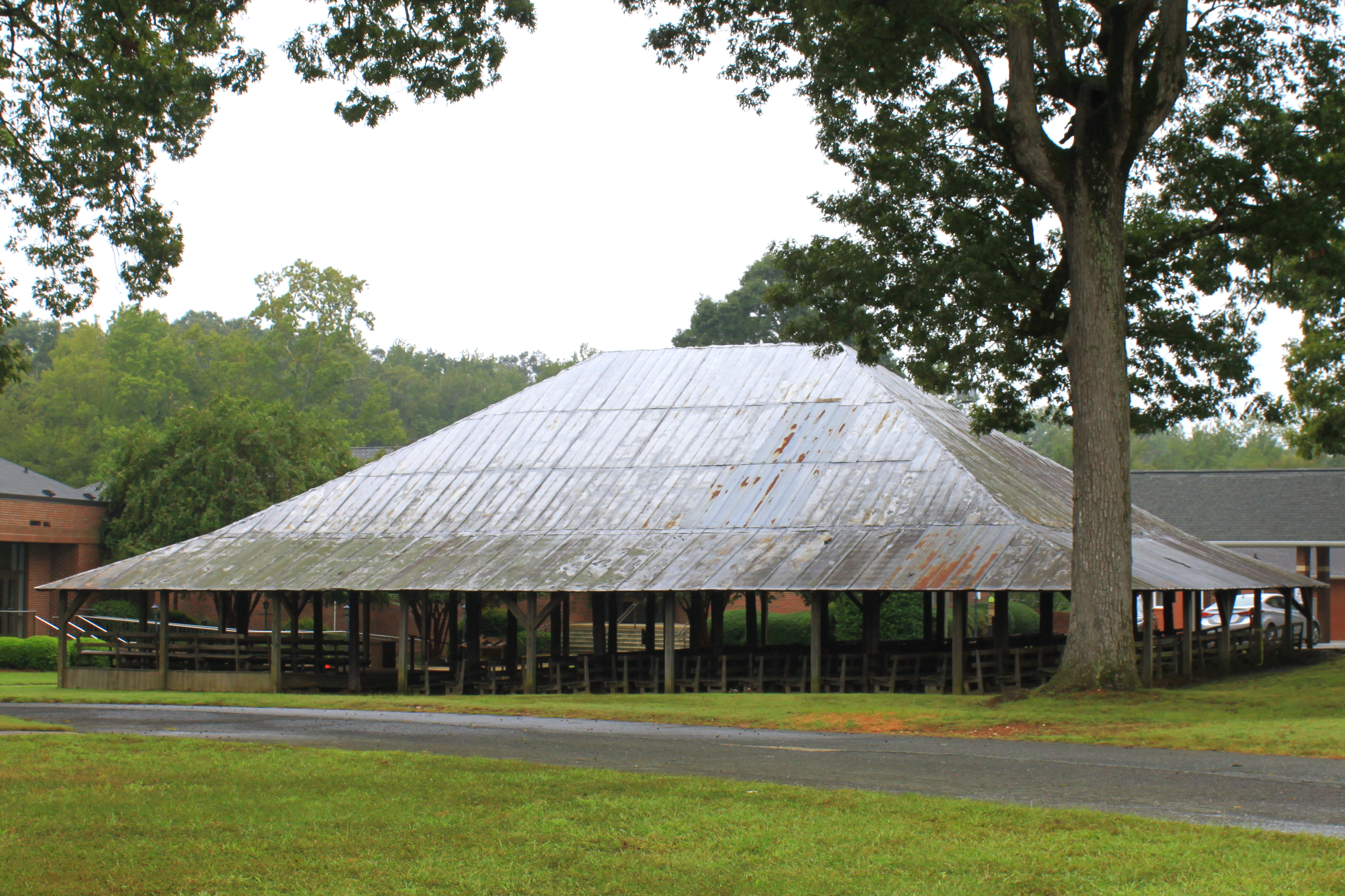

- Location within North Carolina Location within the United States
- Location: Jct of NC 1123 and NC 1121, near Midland, North Carolina
- Coordinates: 35°14′27″N 80°32′12″W
- Area: less than one acre
- Built: c. 1878
- NRHP reference No.: 97000472
- Added to NRHP: May 23, 1997

Bethel Church Arbor is a historic religious shelter for Methodist camp meetings located at Midland, North Carolina, Cabarrus County, North Carolina. It was built about 1878 and is an open rectangular structure topped by a metal-clad hipped roof with flared eaves. It measures 74 feet by 57 feet.

It was listed on the National Register of Historic Places in 1997.
