= Cold Water Creek (Irish Buffalo Creek tributary) =

Stream in North Carolina, US

Cold Water Creek Tributary to Irish Buffalo Creek
- Location of Cold Water Creek mouth Cold Water Creek (Irish Buffalo Creek tributary) (the United States)

Location
- Country: United States
- State: North Carolina
- County: Cabarrus; Rowan
- City: Kannapolis; China Grove

Physical characteristics
- Source: Town Creek divide
  - location: about 0.5 miles northeast of China Grove, North Carolina
  - coordinates: 35°34′42″N 080°33′21″W
  - elevation: 765 ft (233 m)
- Mouth: Irish Buffalo Creek
  - location: about 3 miles northeast of Flows Store, North Carolina
  - coordinates: 35°19′45″N 080°32′03″W
  - elevation: 508 ft (155 m)
- Length: 19.59 mi (31.53 km)
- Basin size: 64.06 square miles (165.9 km^{2})
- Discharge
  - location: Irish Buffalo Creek
  - average: 69.92 cu ft/s (1.980 m^{3}/s) at mouth with Irish Buffalo Creek

Basin features
- Progression: Irish Buffalo Creek → Rocky River → Pee Dee River → Winyah Bay → Atlantic Ocean
- River system: Pee Dee River
- Tributaries
  - left: Little Cold Water Creek
  - right: Threemile Branch
- Waterbodies: Lake Fisher
- Bridges: NC 152, Lentz Road, Old Beatty Ford Road, Bostian Road, Moose Road, Lane Street, Brantley Road, Centergrove Road, US 601-I-85, Old Salisbury Concord Road, Corban Avenue, Old Airport Road, NC 49-73, US 601

Cold Water Creek is a 19.59 mi (31.53 km) long 4th order tributary to Irish Buffalo Creek in Cabarrus County, North Carolina.

== Course ==
Cold Water Creek rises about 0.5 miles northeast of China Grove, North Carolina, and then flows southeast and south to join Irish Buffalo Creek about 3 miles northeast of Flows Store.

== Watershed ==
Cold Water Creek drains 64.06 square miles (165.9 km^{2}) of area, receives about 46.9 in/year of precipitation, has a wetness index of 397.40, and is about 41% forested.
