= Rimertown, North Carolina =

Unincorporated community in North Carolina, US

Coordinates: 35.476713°N 80.481595°W

Rimertown, also referred to as Rimer, is an unincorporated community in northeastern Cabarrus County, North Carolina, United States. Named after the Rimer family, one of the early settlers to the area, it is surrounded by Concord, Kannapolis, Rockwell, and Mount Pleasant and lies in the Mt. Pleasant school district.
