= Irish Buffalo Creek =

Stream in North Carolina, USA

Irish Buffalo Creek Tributary to Rocky River
- Location of Irish Buffalo Creek mouth Irish Buffalo Creek (the United States)

Location
- Country: United States
- State: North Carolina
- County: Cabarrus; Rowan
- City: Concord

Physical characteristics
- Source: Kerr Creek divide
  - location: about 1.5 miles west of Five Points, North Carolina
  - coordinates: 35°33′03″N 080°40′46″W
  - elevation: 850 ft (260 m)
- Mouth: Rocky River
  - location: about 3 miles northeast of Flows Store, North Carolina
  - coordinates: 35°20′19″N 080°32′18″W
  - elevation: 498 ft (152 m)
- Length: 21.89 mi (35.23 km)
- Basin size: 110.35 square miles (285.8 km^{2})
- Discharge
  - location: Rocky River
  - average: 118.06 cu ft/s (3.343 m^{3}/s) at mouth with Rocky River

Basin features
- Progression: Rocky River → Pee Dee River → Winyah Bay → Atlantic Ocean
- River system: Pee Dee River
- Tributaries
  - left: Cold Water Creek
  - right: unnamed tributaries
- Waterbodies: Kannapolis Lake
- Bridges: Saw Road, Cannon Farm Road, Enochville Road, W C Street, Pine Street, Mooresville Road, Rogers Lake Road, Orphanage Road, I-85, NC 73, US 29-NC 73, McGill Avenue, Cabarrus Avenue, Rutherford Street, Wilshire Avenue, US 601, NC 49, Zion Church Road, Flowes Store Road

Irish Buffalo Creek is a 21.89 mi (35.23 km) long 4th order tributary to the Rocky River in Cabarrus County, North Carolina. This is the only stream of this name in the United States.

== Variant names ==
According to the Geographic Names Information System, it has also been known historically as:

- Buffalo Creek

== Course ==
Irish Buffalo Creek rises about 1.5 miles west of Five Points, North Carolina, and then flows south and southeast to join the Rocky River about 3 miles northeast of Flows Store.

== Watershed ==
Irish Buffalo Creek drains 110.35 square miles (285.8 km^{2}) of area, receives about 46.9 in/year of precipitation, has a wetness index of 404.66, and is about 33% forested.
