= Daniel Barringer (geologist) =

American geologist (1860–1929)

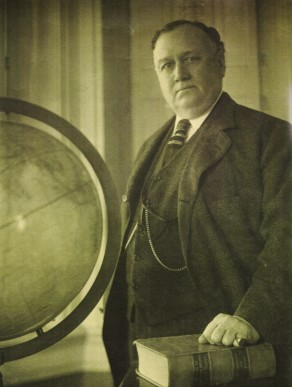
- Born: May 25, 1860; Raleigh, North Carolina
- Died: November 30, 1929 (Aged 69); Philadelphia, Pennsylvania
- Education: Princeton University; University of Pennsylvania; Harvard University; University of Virginia
- Known for: Meteorite
- Scientific career
- Fields: Geology

Daniel Moreau Barringer (May 25, 1860 – November 30, 1929) was an American geologist best known as the first person to prove the existence of an impact crater on the Earth, Meteor Crater in Arizona. The site has been renamed the Barringer Crater in his honor, which is the preferred name used in the scientific community. A small lunar crater on the far side of the Moon is also named after him.

== Early life ==
Daniel Barringer was the son of Daniel Moreau Barringer, a nephew of Confederate General Rufus Barringer and a cousin of Paul Brandon Barringer. He graduated from Princeton University in 1879 at the age of 19, and in 1882 graduated from the University of Pennsylvania School of Law. He later studied geology and mineralogy at Harvard University and at the University of Virginia, respectively.

In 1892, Barringer, along with his friend Richard A. F. Penrose, Jr., and others, purchased a gold and silver mine near Cochise, Arizona. Later, Barringer also discovered the Commonwealth Silver Mine in Pearce, Arizona. These mining ventures made him wealthy.

== Meteor Crater ==
In 1902 Barringer learned of the existence of a large (1.5 km in diameter) crater, located 35 miles east of Flagstaff, Arizona. The crater, now called Meteor Crater, had previously been studied by the geologist Grove Karl Gilbert in 1891. Gilbert had hypothesized that the crater must have been the result of either a gas explosion or a meteorite. After performing experiments in the crater, however, Gilbert's conclusion was that the crater could not be the result of an impact, and therefore could only be the result of an explosion. He concluded this despite the clear presence of thousands of small meteoritic particles in the vicinity of the crater.

Upon hearing of the existence of the crater and the meteoritic iron, Barringer became convinced that the crater was of meteoritic origin. With both scientific and monetary aims in mind, Barringer created the "Standard Iron Company" in order to mine the crater for the iron that he assumed must be buried below its surface. The Standard Iron Company conducted drilling operations in and around the crater between 1903 and 1905, and concluded that the crater had indeed been caused by a violent impact. It was unable to find the meteorite, however.

== Scientific results ==
In 1906, Barringer and his partner, the mathematician and physicist Benjamin C. Tilghman, presented their first papers to the U.S. Geological Survey outlining the evidence in support of the impact theory. The papers were published in the Proceedings of the Academy of Natural Sciences in Philadelphia.

By the late 1920s, Barringer had convinced most of the scientific community that his impact theory was correct. The theory has been further confirmed with new evidence since then, most notably by Eugene Shoemaker during the 1960s.

The mining of the crater continued until 1929 without ever finding the ten-million ton meteorite that Barringer assumed must be hidden. By this point Barringer had spent over $600,000 with no iron profits to show for it, nearly bankrupting him. At this time the astronomer Forest Ray Moulton performed calculations on the energy expended by the meteorite on impact, and concluded that the meteorite had most likely vaporized when it landed.

== Death ==
Barringer died of a heart attack on November 30, 1929, shortly after reading the very persuasive arguments that no iron was to be found. He was survived by his wife, Margaret Bennett, and eight children, who, with their descendants, formed the Barringer Crater Company, which owns the site to this day as a family business.

== Legacy ==
In honor of Daniel Barringer’s memory, in 1982 the Meteoritical Society established an award, the Barringer Medal, given at the Meteoritical Society annual meeting, to recognize outstanding work in the field of impact crater research which is sponsored by the Barringer Crater Company. In addition, in 2002 as a memorial to Daniel Barringer and his sons’ contributions to the field of impact crater research, the Barringer Crater Company established the Barringer Family Fund for Meteorite Impact Research to support field work by eligible students on the study of impact cratering processes.

== See also ==
- The Meteor Crater
- Impact crater
