= Stephen Cabarrus =

American politician

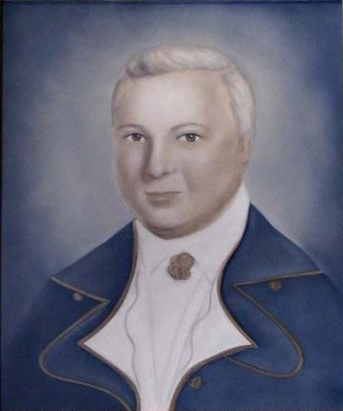

Stephen Cabarrus (/kəˈbɛərəs/ kuh-BAIR-us) (1754–1808) held the office of the Speaker of the House of Representatives in North Carolina from 1789 to 1793 and from 1800 to 1805. Cabarrus County, North Carolina is named after him because, while serving as speaker, Cabarrus cast the deciding vote to create the new county in 1792. He was the Anti-Federalist candidate in the 1790 election for North Carolina's 2nd congressional district, the state's first congressional elections, losing to Hugh Williamson. He then ran in the 8th district in 1793, losing to Federalist William Johnston Dawson.

Born in Bayonne, Labourd, France, Cabarrus lived in Edenton, North Carolina, having emigrated in 1776. His remains were interred in the churchyard of St. Paul's Church, Edenton.

== See also ==
- Francisco Cabarrus
