= Little Meadow Creek (Rocky River tributary) =

Stream in North Carolina, USA

Little Meadow Creek Tributary to Rocky River
- Location of Little Meadow Creek mouth Little Meadow Creek (Rocky River tributary) (the United States)

Location
- Country: United States
- State: North Carolina
- County: Cabarrus

Physical characteristics
- Source: Pole Bridge Creek divide
  - location: Smiths Lake, about 1.5 miles south of Barrier Mills, North Carolina
  - coordinates: 35°19′37″N 080°25′19″W
  - elevation: 650 ft (200 m)
- Mouth: Rocky River
  - location: about 2.5 miles west of Locust, North Carolina
  - coordinates: 35°15′36″N 080°28′29″W
  - elevation: 462 ft (141 m)
- Length: 6.32 mi (10.17 km)
- Basin size: 5.23 square miles (13.5 km^{2})
- Discharge
  - location: Rocky River
  - average: 6.33 cu ft/s (0.179 m^{3}/s) at mouth with Rocky River

Basin features
- Progression: Rocky River → Pee Dee River → Winyah Bay → Atlantic Ocean
- River system: Pee Dee River
- Tributaries
  - left: unnamed tributaries
  - right: unnamed tributaries
- Bridges: County Line Road, Mauney Road, NC 200, Reed Mine Road

Little Meadow Creek is a 6.32 mi (10.17 km) long 2nd order tributary to the Rocky River in Cabarrus County, North Carolina.

== Course ==
Little Meadow Creek rises in Smiths Lake, about 1.5 miles south of Barrier Mills, North Carolina, and then flows southwest to join the Rocky River about 2.5 miles west of Locust.

== Watershed ==
Little Meadow Creek drains 5.23 square miles (13.5 km^{2}) of area, receives about 47.6 in/year of precipitation, has a wetness index of 441.93, and is about 49% forested.
