= Midland, North Carolina =

Town in North Carolina, United States

- Town
- Seal

- Location within North Carolina Location within the United States
- Coordinates: 35°13′38″N 80°30′03″W
- Country: United States
- State: North Carolina
- County: Cabarrus
- Founded: 1913
- Incorporated: 2000

Area
  - Total: 13.34 sq mi (34.6 km^{2})
  - Land: 13.34 sq mi (34.6 km^{2})
  - Water: 0.00 sq mi (0 km^{2})
- Elevation: 571 ft (174 m)

Population (2020)
  - Total: 4,684
  - Density: 352.1/sq mi (135.94/km^{2})
- Time zone: UTC-5 (EST)
  - Summer (DST): UTC-4 (EDT)
- ZIP Code: 28107
- FIPS code: 37-42760
- GNIS feature ID: 2406159
- Website: www.midlandnc.us

Midland is a town in southern Cabarrus County in the U.S. state of North Carolina. Located in the Charlotte region of North Carolina, Midland is a 30-minute commute to uptown Charlotte. The name of the town is derived from its location approximately halfway between Charlotte and Oakboro on the railroad line. The population was 4,684 as of the 2020 census, up from 3,073 in 2010.

The U.S. Postal Service has maintained a post office in Midland for many years (ZIP code 28107), and rural mail routes extend from Midland into portions of four counties.

== History ==
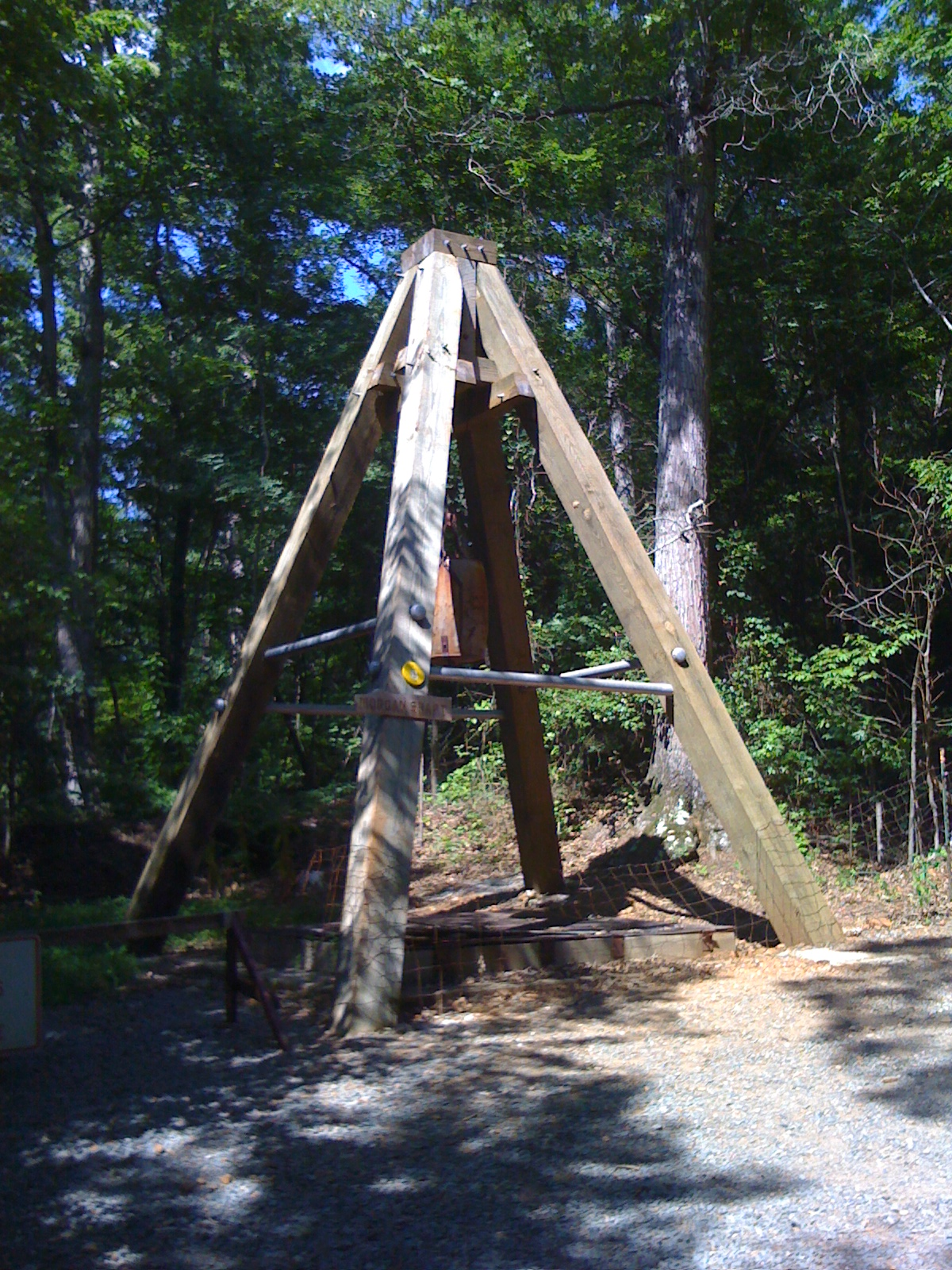
Reed Gold Mine

Midland began as a railroad town about 1913 with the arrival of rail service via the North Carolina Railroad (NCRR). Prior to this, a community named Garmon existed in the area (a few miles to the east) around the Garmon Mill begun by Michael Garmon in the late-1700s, and Garmon appears on an 1864 map of North Carolina. Another community located to the west, Cabarrus Station, also predated Midland as a railroad stop, and is now within the town's municipal limits. Midland was incorporated in 2000.

Formerly, the economy of Midland was agricultural with some textile-related manufacturing jobs. With the growth of Charlotte to the west, farming has played a decreasing role in the economic life of the town. Increasingly, Midland has become a bedroom community for those commuting to work in nearby Charlotte and Concord.

The Reed Gold Mine, site of the first discovery of gold in the United States, is located east of the town. The mine is now a historic site under state management and is open to the public. The area was an important gold mining center in the 19th century; however, gold mining activity in the region predates the founding of Midland.

Midland is the former home of Concord Speedway, which opened in 1982 and held racing events from the NASCAR Whelen Southern Modified Tour, CARS Tour, and other series, the track closed down in July 2019 and was sold to Copart, who demolished the speedway and built a parking lot on the site.

The Bethel Church Arbor, John Bunyan Green Farm, and Robert Harvey Morrison Farm and Pioneer Mills Gold Mine are listed on the National Register of Historic Places.

== Geography ==
The town is in southern Cabarrus County, about 22 miles (35 km) by road east of Charlotte. The town sits at approximately 500 to 550 feet (150 to 170 m) above sea level. The land is gently rolling with no especially high points.

US Highway 601 and NC 24/27 are the major highways. US 601 leads north 14 miles (23 km) to Concord, the Cabarrus county seat, and south 17 miles (27 km) to Monroe, while Highways 24 and 27 lead east 19 miles (31 km) to Albemarle and west into Charlotte.

According to the U.S. Census Bureau, the town of Midland has an area of 13.3 square miles (34 km^{2}), all land. Muddy Creek flows through the town just south of its center, leading southeast to the Rocky River, which passes just east of the town. Via the Rocky River, Midland is within the watershed of the Pee Dee River.

== Climate ==
The climate in Midland is temperate, with chilly winters and hot summers. Thunderstorms are frequent in warmer weather. Severe weather occurs occasionally, and a few tornadoes have been recorded in Midland and its vicinity. Snow accumulations occur on occasion in the winter, and anywhere from zero to three significant accumulations of snow might reasonably be expected in an average winter. Accumulating snows generally melt away between snow events, and there is no consistent snowpack in winter. Pleasantly warm daytime temperatures may be experienced into November. Rainfall averages 40–45 inches (1,000–1,100 mm) per year.

== Demographics ==
Historical population
Census	Pop.	Note	%±
2010	3,073		—
2020	4,684		52.4%
U.S. Decennial Census

=== Racial and ethnic composition ===
Midland town, North Carolina – Racial and ethnic composition Note: the US Census treats Hispanic/Latino as an ethnic category. This table excludes Latinos from the racial categories and assigns them to a separate category. Hispanics/Latinos may be of any race.
Race / Ethnicity (NH = Non-Hispanic)	Pop 2010	Pop 2020	% 2010	% 2020
White alone (NH)	2,696	3,343	87.73%	71.37%
Black or African American alone (NH)	188	580	6.12%	12.38%
Native American or Alaska Native alone (NH)	8	17	0.26%	0.36%
Asian alone (NH)	27	47	0.88%	1.00%
Native Hawaiian or Pacific Islander alone (NH)	0	0	0.00%	0.00%
Other race alone (NH)	2	49	0.07%	1.05%
Mixed race or Multiracial (NH)	43	192	1.40%	4.10%
Hispanic or Latino (any race)	109	456	3.55%	9.74%
Total	3,073	4,684	100.00%	100.00%

=== 2020 census ===
As of the 2020 census, Midland had a population of 4,684. The median age was 36.8 years. 26.7% of residents were under the age of 18 and 13.7% of residents were 65 years of age or older. For every 100 females there were 94.8 males, and for every 100 females age 18 and over there were 92.6 males age 18 and over.

0.0% of residents lived in urban areas, while 100.0% lived in rural areas.

There were 1,694 households in Midland, of which 39.2% had children under the age of 18 living in them. Of all households, 58.5% were married-couple households, 14.3% were households with a male householder and no spouse or partner present, and 20.5% were households with a female householder and no spouse or partner present. About 18.9% of all households were made up of individuals and 7.4% had someone living alone who was 65 years of age or older.

There were 1,745 housing units, of which 2.9% were vacant. The homeowner vacancy rate was 0.4% and the rental vacancy rate was 1.5%.

== Economy ==
Corning operates a large-scale fiber-optic cable manufacturing plant in Midland that underwent a $50M expansion in 2012. Intertape Polymer Group announced in 2016 that they would build a $49M advanced manufacturing plant for the e-commerce sector north of the Corning plant.
