= Alleyne =

Alleyne is an English-language surname. People with the name include:

- Aaliyah Alleyne (born 1994), West Indian cricketer
- Alleyne baronets
- Anthony Alleyne (born 1993), Barbadian cricketer
- Archie Alleyne (1933–2015), Canadian jazz musician
- Sir Brian George Keith Alleyne (born 1943), Dominican judge
- Cameron Chesterfield Alleyne (1880–1955), Barbados-born American bishop of the African Methodist Episcopal Zion Church
- Camille Wardrop Alleyne (born 1966), Trinidad-born American aerospace engineer, space scientist, and science ambassador
- Damian Alleyne (born 1983), Barbadian swimmer
- David Alleyne (cricketer) (born 1976), English cricketer
- Ebony Alleyne (born 1983), British singer
- George Alleyne (born 1932), Barbadian academic
- Hartley Alleyne (born 1957), Barbadian cricketer
- Haynes Gibbes Alleyne (1813–1882), Barbadian born, Australian doctor and ichthyologist
- Jade Alleyne (born 2001), British actress
- Kerry Alleyne (born 1983), Dominican footballer
- Mabel Alleyne (1896–1961), English wood engraver
- Mark Alleyne (born 1968), English cricketer
- Max Alleyne (born 2005), English footballer and son of Mark Alleyne
- Mervyn C. Alleyne (1933–2016), Trinidadian linguist
- Nikhil Alleyne (born 2004), American-Trinidadian alpine skier
- Shagari Alleyne (born 1984), American basketball player
- Sonita Alleyne (born 1968), Master of Jesus College, Cambridge and British television producer
- Thomas Alleyne, 16th-century English clergyman
- Thyra Alleyne (1875–1954), English academic

== See also ==
- Alleyn
- Alleyne v. United States, a U.S. Supreme Court case
