= Barber–Scotia College =

Historically black college in Concord, North Carolina, US

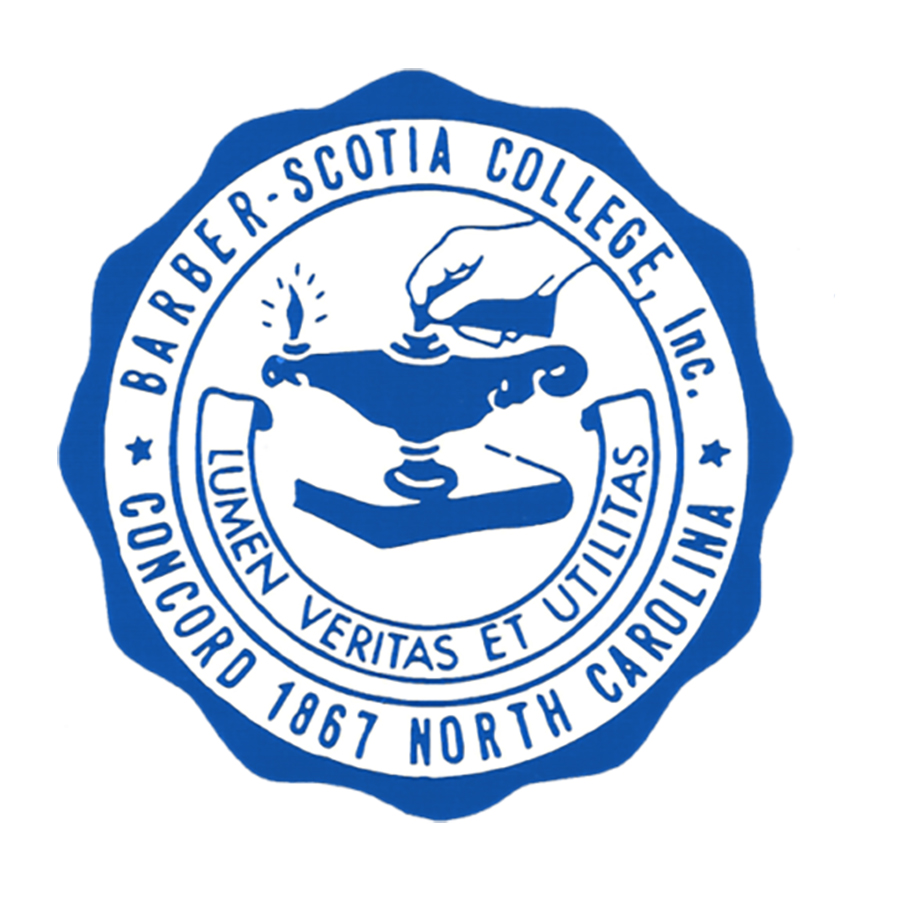
- Motto: Lumen Veritas et Utilitas
- Motto in English: Light, Truth, and Service
- Type: Private unaccredited historically black college
- Established: 1867; 159 years ago
- Religious affiliation: Presbyterian Church (USA)
- President: Chris Rey
- Students: 117 (2025–2026)
- Location: Concord, North Carolina, United States
- Colors: Royal blue and gray
- Sporting affiliations: USCAA
- Mascot: Saber-toothed tiger
- Website: www.b-sc.edu
- Barber–Scotia College
- U.S. National Register of Historic Places
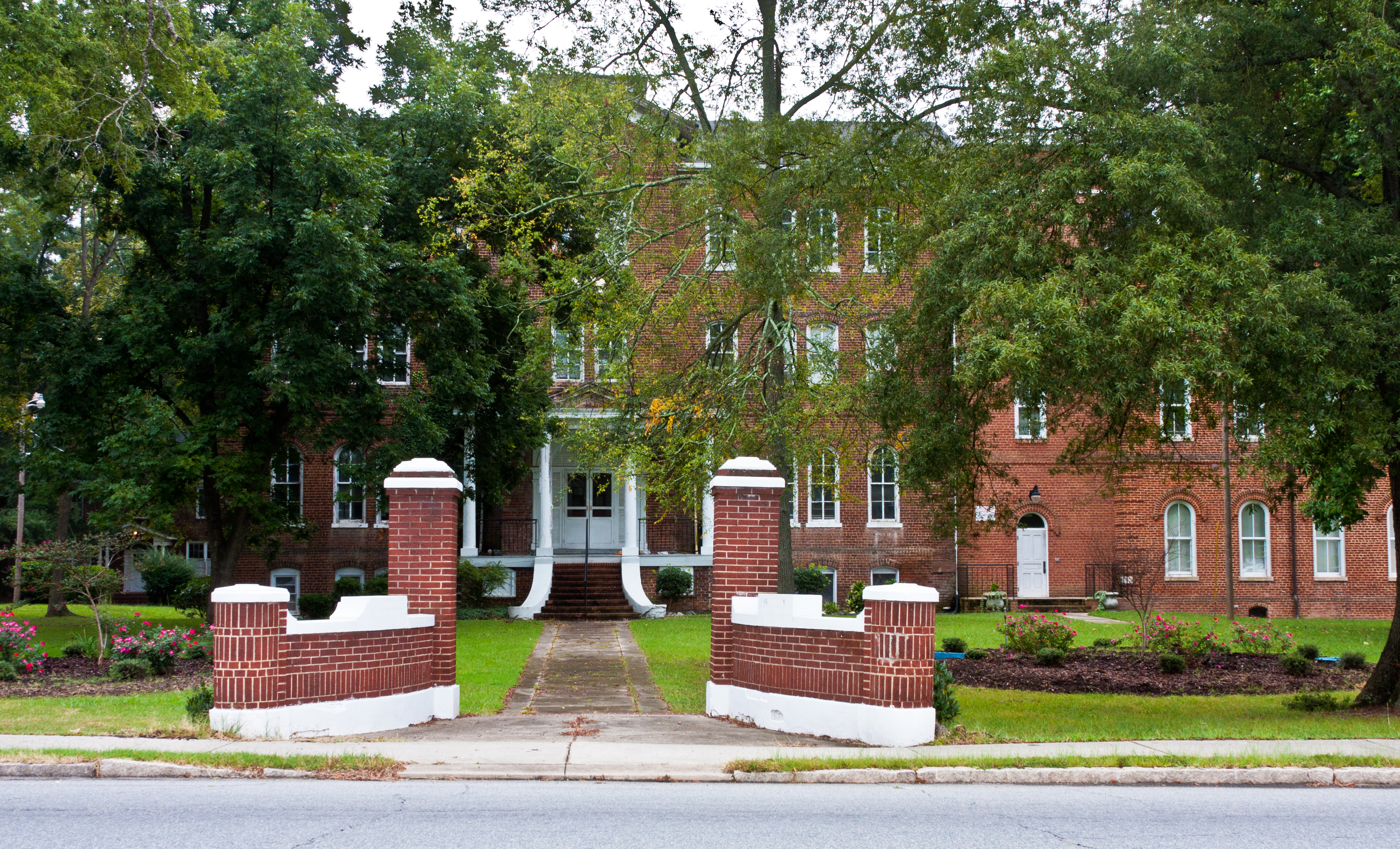

- Location within North Carolina Location within the United States
- Location: 145 Cabarrus Ave. West, Concord, North Carolina
- Coordinates: 35°24′23″N 80°35′9″W
- Built: 1876
- Architects: Ahrens, F. W.
- Architectural style: Colonial Revival, Second Empire, Italianate
- NRHP reference No.: 85000378
- Added to NRHP: February 28, 1985

Barber–Scotia College is a private, unaccredited,historically black college in Concord, North Carolina, United States. It began as a seminary in 1867 before becoming a college in 1916. It is affiliated with the Presbyterian Church (USA).

== History ==
=== Scotia Seminary ===
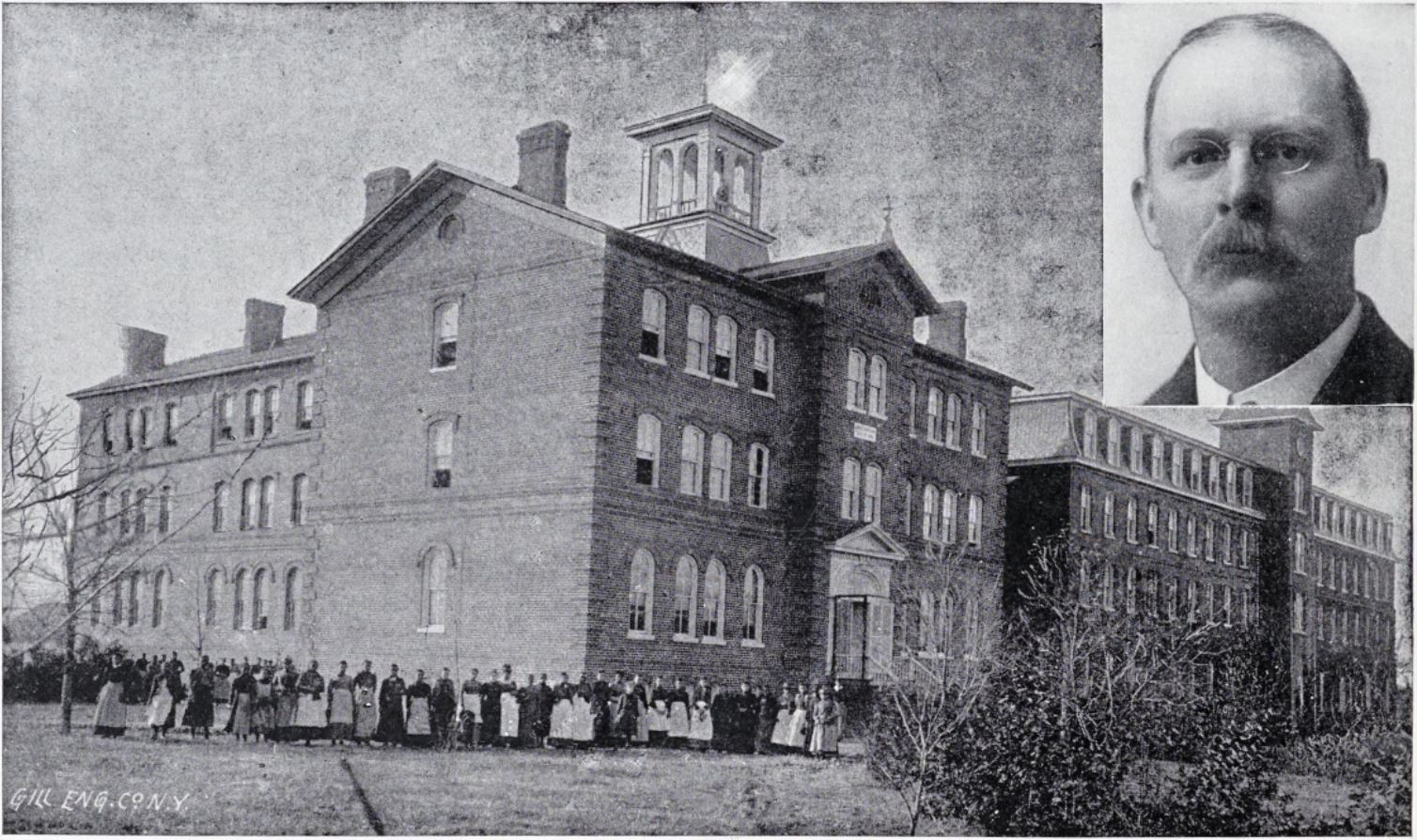
Scotia Seminary and President A. W. Verner, c. 1910

Barber–Scotia began as a female seminary in 1867. Scotia Seminary was founded by the Reverend Luke Dorland and chartered in 1870. A project by the Presbyterian Church to prepare young African American southern women who were the daughters of former slaves, for careers as social workers and teachers, it was the coordinate women's school for Biddle University, now Johnson C. Smith University.

It was the first historically black female institution of higher education established after the American Civil War. For the first time, it gave black women an alternative to becoming domestic servants or field hands."

Scotia Seminary was modeled after Mount Holyoke Female Seminary (now Mount Holyoke College) and was referred to as "The Mount Holyoke of the South". The seminary offered grammar, science, and domestic arts. In 1908 it had 19 teachers and 291 students. From its founding in 1867 to 1908 it had enrolled 2,900 students, with 604 having graduated from the grammar department and 109 from the normal department. Faith Hall, built in 1891, was the first dormitory at Scotia Seminary. It is listed in National Register of Historic Places and "is one of only four 19th-century institutional buildings left in Cabarrus County." It was closed by the college during the 1970s due to lack of funds for its maintenance. As of 2018, Faith Hall was once again being used as a dormitory.

Presidents
Luke Dorland	1867–1885
D.J. Satterfield	1885–1908
A.W. Verner	1908–1922
T.R. Lewis	1922–1929
Myron J. Croker	1929–1932
Leland S. Cozart	1932–1964
Lionel H. Newsom	1964–1966
Jerome L. Gresham	1966–1974
Mable Parker McLean	1974–1988
Tyrone L. Burkette	1988–1989
Lionel H. Newsom (interim)	1989–1990
Gus T. Ridgel (interim)	1990
Joel 0. Nwagbaraocha	1990–1994
Asa T. Spaulding Jr.	1994
Mable Parker McLean	1994–1996
Sammie W. Potts	1996–2004
Leon Howard (interim)	2004
Gloria Bromell Tinubu	2004–2006
Mable Parker McLean (interim)	2006
Carl Flamer	2006–2008
David Olah	2008–2015
Yvonne Tracey (interim)	2015-2016
David Olah	2016–2019
Melvin I. Douglass	2019–2022
Tracey Flemmings (interim)	2022–2023
Chris V. Rey	2023–Present

=== 1916–2004 ===
It was renamed to Scotia Women's College in 1916. In 1930, the seminary was merged with another female institution, Barber Memorial College, which was founded in 1896 in Anniston, Alabama by Margaret M. Barber as a memorial to her husband. This merger created Barber–Scotia Junior College for women.

The school granted its first bachelor's degree in 1945, and became a four-year women's college in 1946. In 1954, Barber–Scotia College became a coeducational institution and received accreditation from the Southern Association of Colleges and Schools. Today, the college maintains close ties to the Presbyterian Church.

=== 2004–2015 ===
In February 2004, Sammie Potts resigned the presidency, giving no reason for departure. On June 24, 2004, one week after appointing its new president, Gloria Bromell Tinubu, the college learned that it had lost its accreditation due to what the Southern Association of Colleges and Schools said was a failure to comply with SACS Principles and Philosophy of Accreditation (Integrity), as the school "awarded degrees to nearly 30 students in the adult program who SACS determined hadn't fulfilled the proper requirements".

This meant that students became ineligible for federal aid and that many employees would be laid off. As over 90% of the students at Barber–Scotia received some sort of federal financial aid, enrollment then dropped from 600 students in 2004 to 91 students in 2005 and on-campus housing was closed down.

During her tenure, President Gloria Bromell Tinubu led a strategic planning effort to change the college from a four-year liberal arts program to a college of entrepreneurship and business, and established partnerships with accredited colleges and top-tiered universities. She later left the college when the new board leadership decided to pursue religious studies instead.

Former president and alumna Mable Parker McLean was hired as president on an interim basis. In February 2006 a committee of the General Assembly Council of the Presbyterian Church (USA) voted to continue the denomination's financial support for Barber–Scotia, noting that its physical facilities were "substantial and well-secured" and that the school was undertaking serious planning for the future.

In May 2006, it was reported that Barber–Scotia would rent space on its campus to St. Augustine's College to use for an adult-education program: "Under the terms of the deal, St. Augustine's will pay Barber–Scotia for the space for its Gateway degree program starting this fall."

McLean was replaced by President David Olah, who accepted the position without payment, and the college re-opened in 2006 with a limited number of students. During this time, the "previous attempts to revive the college [which] have centered on an entrepreneurial or business curriculum" were formally abandoned "in favor of focusing more on religious studies". Flamer also worked to eliminate debt and worked with alumni and the community to save the college. Olah left in 2015, to be replaced by Yvonne Tracey, who departed at the end of 2015.

=== 2016–present ===
In September 2016, the newly elected board of trustees hired David Olah as president to once again lead the college, at which twelve students were enrolled. The school closed for the spring semester in the 2016 academic year to restructure and implement its new strategic plan.

In February 2018, the Independent Tribune said the college was being sold and a school might be built there. President Olah said that while the college owed millions, it was not for sale. Trustees said that while the college could not offer federal financial aid yet, several programs were offered which trained students for jobs.

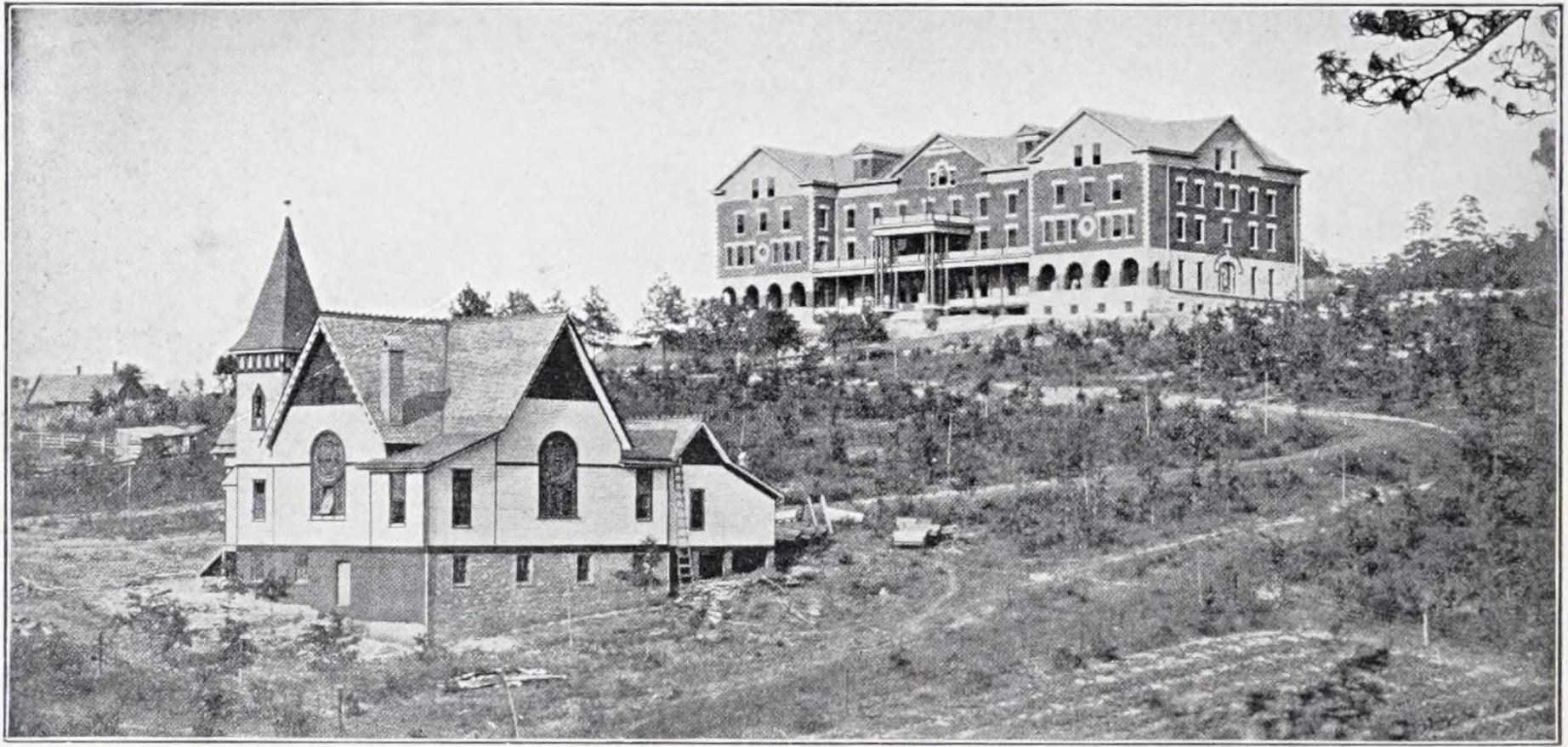
Barber Memorial Seminary in Anniston, Alabama, c. 1910

On March 16, 2019, the college's alumni association held a meeting about the college's future. At that time, the Independent Tribune claimed the college was holding no classes. Melvin Isadore Douglass became the college's president in April 2019, and an official inauguration was planned in January 2020. According to the Independent Tribune, most of the college's 45 students were taking classes online.

In January 2020 the Barber-Scotia Property Task Force started working on plans for what to do with the campus. After meetings with community leaders, it was determined possible uses for campus buildings as of September 2020 included a school, a museum, and a business center. Because the gym was in good shape with a pool that could be used, an aquatics center was another possibility. Faith Hall, Graves Hall and Leland S. Cozart House were on the National Register of Historic Places and would likely be preserved, but some of those buildings were in such bad shape no one could go inside.

In February 2021, the city and the college made a formal agreement to work together.

Douglass and Chairwoman Karen M. Soares, with the aid of Congresswoman Alma Adams, were able to get a 21-year, estimated, $12 million loan forgiven. This program was administered by the Department of Education's HBCU Capital Finance Program. The program provided low-cost capital to finance improvements to the infrastructure of the nation's Historically Black Colleges and Universities.

The Association for Biblical Higher Education said the college had inquired about accreditation but as of July 2021 had not started the process, which would take eight to ten years.

A community survey received a strong response, and studies were planned for renovating and reusing the buildings. A partnership with Cabarrus County Schools was considered. After lack of cooperation from college leaders, the agreement with the city ended in November 2021.

According to a February 1, 2022 press release, Roberta Pinckney became chair of the board.

An August 2022 article in the Independent Tribune said, "seven of the 15 buildings are deemed unoccupiable", that six others needed violations to be corrected, and that the college had awarded no degrees in 18 years. The article said that none of the college's leaders lived in the county, and that the college claimed to have 24 students who would be studying entrepreneurship, religion, and renewable energy in September 2022. College leaders announced a partnership with the unaccredited, for-profit Medcerts for health services training online. The Cabarrus County tax assessor was determining whether the college still qualified as a nonprofit; if not, land and buildings worth almost $12 million could be sold.

As of December 2022 The Charlotte Observer reported four students were taking classes, all online, and in 2023, the college held a graduation ceremony for four online students. An investigation by WSOC-TV revealed that Cabarrus County was considering ending the college's tax exemption.

In a March 16, 2023 news release, the city announced that a task force formed in 2017 to help the college was disbanding. The task force accused the college of not cooperating.

A July 6, 2023 news release stated that trustees appointed Chris V. Rey, former mayor of Spring Lake, North Carolina, to succeed Flemmings as president.

On April 30, 2024, Partners for Rural Impact and Elizabeth City State University awarded Barber–Scotia College with a $32,500 grant to spearhead a workforce development program aimed at revitalizing the Sage Library situated on the college campus.

The Independent Tribune reported in August 2025 that 90 students were expected on August 22, the first to take classes on campus "for the first time in nearly a decade". In January 2026, the North Carolina Property Tax Commission ruled that Barber–Scotia was an educational institution. The Independent Tribune reported 100 students on campus. As of spring 2026, all instruction had been moved online until the institution could regain accreditation, though "a few" students continued to study on campus. The institution had 80 faculty and staff, most of whom were part-time volunteers apart from maintenance personnel.

== Academics ==
The college offers the following four degree programs: Bachelor of Arts in business, Bachelor of Arts in Religious Studies, Bachelor of Arts in Sports Management and a Bachelor of Science in Bio-Energy. Each academic discipline has several fields of concentration.

== Athletics ==
Barber–Scotia College's athletic programs are known as the Mighty Sabers.

Barber–Scotia formerly competed in the National Association of Intercollegiate Athletics (NAIA), primarily in the now-defunct Eastern Intercollegiate Athletic Conference (EIAC) until the end of the 2004–2005 season, during the time the school lost its accreditation and could no longer field athletics teams.

Barber-Scotia were members of the United States Collegiate Athletic Association (USCAA) until 2015.

In 2024, Barber–Scotia announced it had joined the New South Athletic Conference.

In 2025, the Barber-Scotia men's basketball team was invited to participate in the inaugural HBCU Hoops Invitational, with organizers assuring the school that their accreditation issues would not be a problem. The Sabers were supposed to face Florida A&M in the first round, but the day of the game, FAMU claimed that Barber-Scotia forfeited the game. However, Barber-Scotia players and staff disputed the claim, stating that the team was ready to play.

Even if the game was played, it would not count towards official NCAA or NAIA records. Because of Barber-Scotia's lack of accreditation, they appear on each organization's non-countable opponent lists.

== Notable alumni ==
=== Scotia Seminary ===
- Mary McLeod Bethune, influential leader and an advisor to President Franklin D. Roosevelt; founder of school for black students in Daytona Beach, Florida that eventually merged to become Bethune–Cookman University
- Annie Walker Blackwell, 1876, suffragist and church worker, daughter of Dublin Walker and wife of George Lincoln Blackwell
- Lucy Hughes Brown, 1885, first African-American woman physician licensed to practice in both North Carolina and South Carolina, co-founder of a nursing school and hospital
- Addie Whiteman Dickerson, clubwoman and activist
- Julia Pearl Hughes, 1893, first African-American woman pharmacist to own and operate her own drug store and first African-American woman to run for elective office in the state of New York
- Lyda Moore Merrick, founder of The Merrick/Washington Magazine for the Blind
- Sarah Dudley Pettey, educator, writer, organist, and political activist
- Ida Van Smith, pilot and flight instructor
- Emma Jane Wilson, missionary, teacher, founder of an industrial school in Mayesville, South Carolina; taught and mentored one of Scotia Seminary's most notable alumnae, Mary McLeod Bethune
- W. Gertrude Brown, 1911, educator and social worker; first head resident of the Phyllis Wheatley Settlement House in Minneapolis
- Mary Alice Lynch, educator, librarian and temperance leader; founded the Young Women's Christian Temperance Union at Livingstone College in 1891
- Mary Rice Phelps, 1885, teacher and writer; her essay "The Responsibility of Women as Teachers" was included in the Afro-American Encyclopaedia (1895)

=== Barber–Scotia College ===
- Vivian Ayers Allen, poet, activist, classicist; mother of Debbie Allen and Phylicia Rashad
- Katie Geneva Cannon, first black woman ordained in the United Presbyterian Church in the United States of America and Annie Scales Rogers Professor of Christian Ethics at Union Presbyterian Seminary in Richmond, Virginia
- Paulette Dillard, scientist, business leader, expert in clinical diagnostic medicine, 18th president of Shaw University
- Mildred Mitchell-Bateman, 1939, physician and medical administrator
- LeRoy Whitfield, leading journalist reporting on AIDS in the African-American community
