= Dancy =

Dancy may refer to:

== People with the surname ==
- Bill Dancy (born 1951), American baseball coach
- Chanda Dancy (born 1978), American film composer, violinist, keyboardist, and singer
- Deborah Dancy (born 1949), American painter, printmaker and mixed media artist
- Franklin D. Dancy (born 1840/1) American politician, blacksmith and mayor
- Hugh Dancy (born 1975), English actor
- Jake Dancy (born 1978), American soccer defender
- John C. Dancy (1857–1920), American politician, journalist, and educator
- John Dancy (1920–2019), English headmaster
- Jonathan Dancy (born 1946), British philosopher
- Keith Dancy (1929–2001), Canadian hockey announcer
- Mira Dancy (born 1979), American painter
- Paul Dancy (born 1978), English cricketer
- Vincent Dancy (born 1984), American football coach

== Places ==
=== France ===
- Dancy, Eure-et-Loir, commune in the Eure-et-Loir department

=== United States ===
- Dancy, Wisconsin, unincorporated community

== Other uses ==
- Dancy (citrus), a citrus cultivar of the tangerine/mandarin type
