= St. Mark's African Methodist Episcopal Church =

Historic church in Minnesota, United States

- U.S. National Register of Historic Places
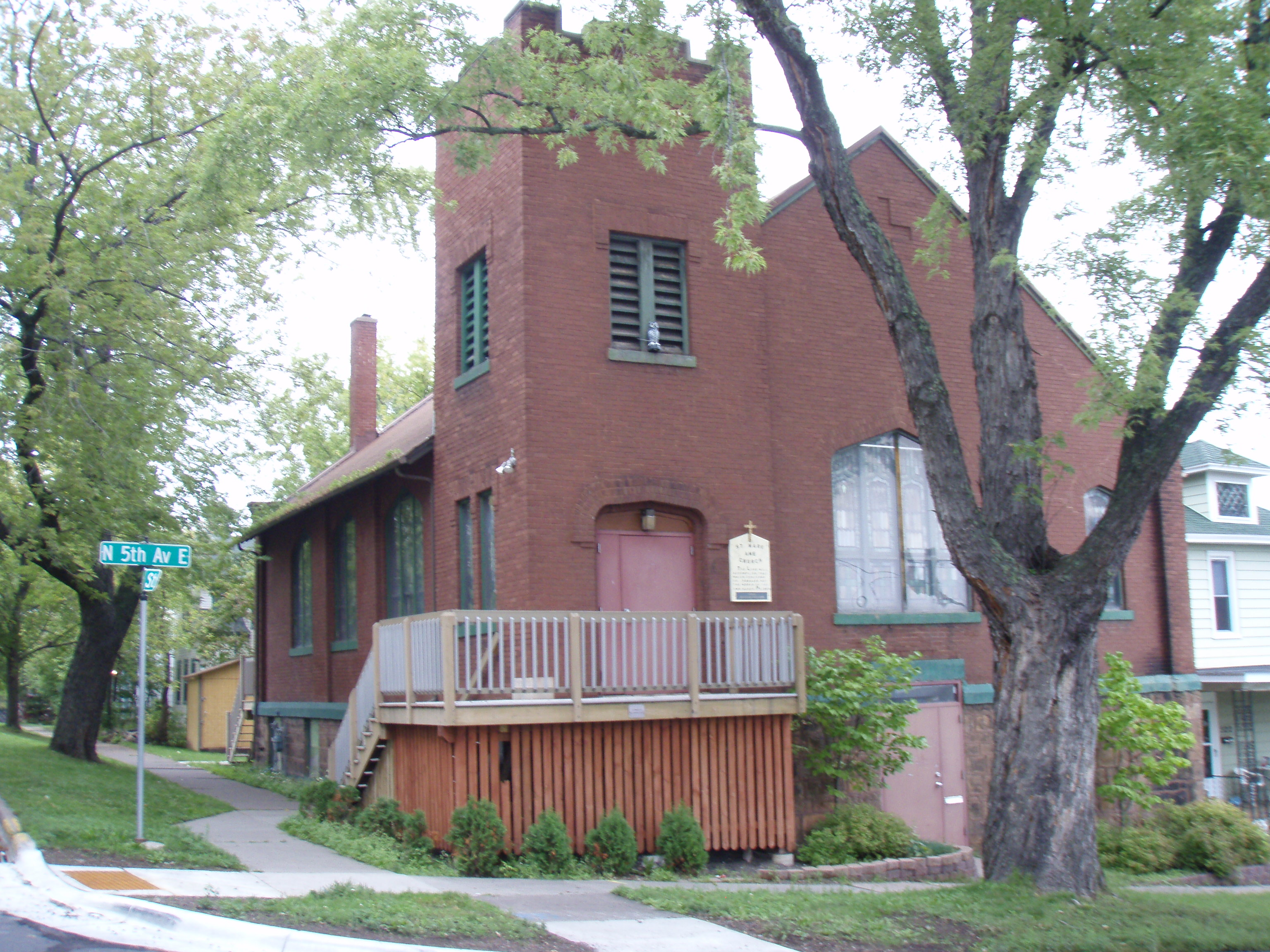
- St. Mark's A.M.E. Church from the southwest

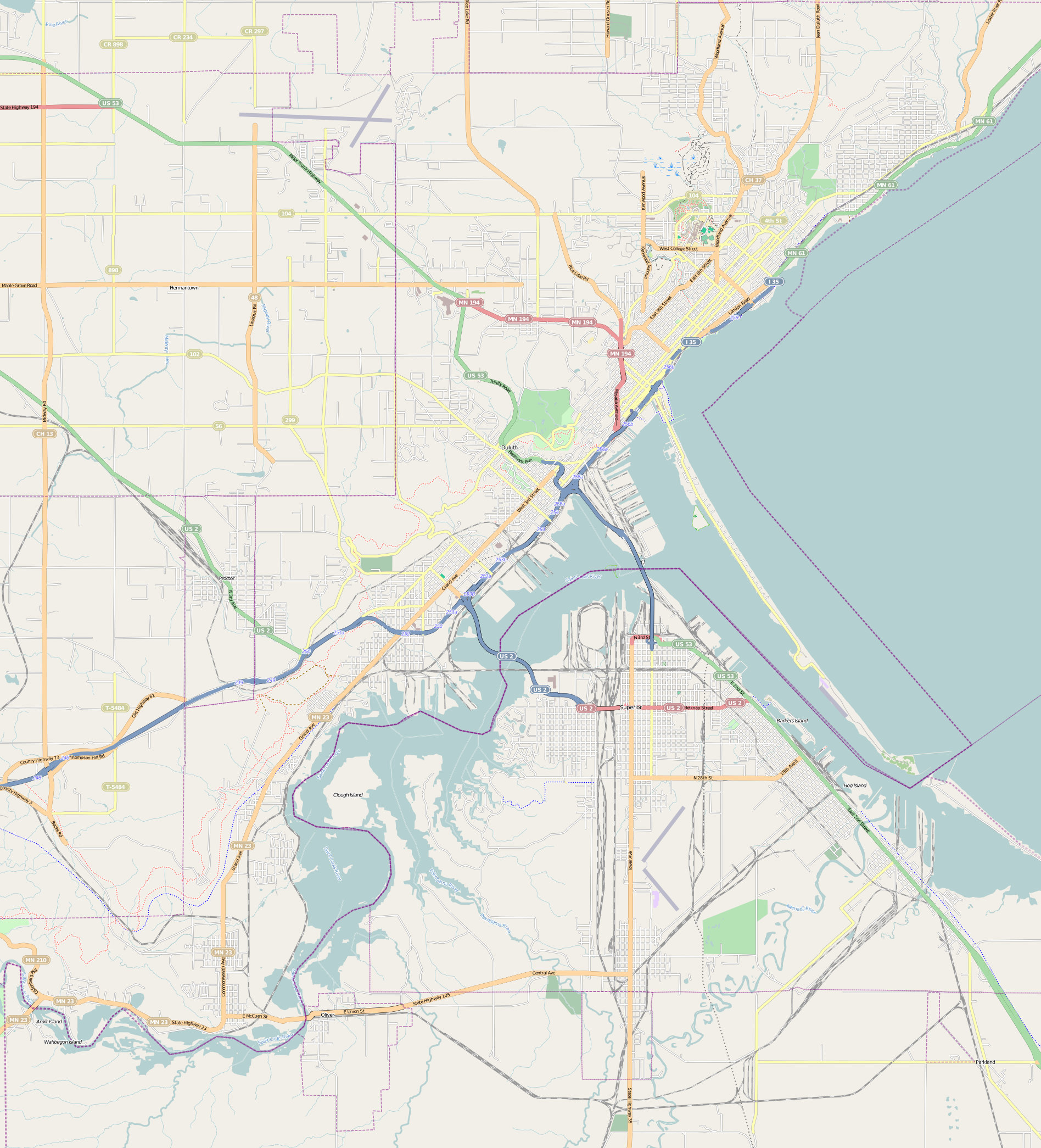
- Location within Duluth Location within Minnesota Location within the United States
- Location: 530 N. 5th Avenue E., Duluth, Minnesota
- Coordinates: 46°47′45″N 92°5′53.5″W
- Area: Less than one acre
- Built: 1900, 1913
- Architectural style: Late Gothic Revival
- NRHP reference No.: 91000439
- Added to NRHP: April 16, 1991

St. Mark's African Methodist Episcopal Church is a historic African Methodist Episcopal (AME) church in Duluth, Minnesota, United States. St. Mark's has played a central role in Duluth's African-American community for more than 124 years. While other black organizations dissolved or moved to the Minneapolis–Saint Paul area, St. Mark's remains a local mainstay.

The lower level of the building was constructed in 1900 and the Gothic Revival upper level was completed in 1913. The church was listed on the National Register of Historic Places in 1991 for its local significance in the themes of black ethnic heritage and social history. It was nominated for serving as a religious and social center for Duluth's African-American community, and for its status as the city's only historic building constructed by and for African Americans.

== Origin ==
Duluth's African-American population at the turn of the 20th century was small but active. Between 1910 and 1930, about 400 Black individuals lived in Duluth, declining to 314 in 1940. Black residents established fraternal orders, political clubs, and newspapers in the port city, mirroring larger establishments in Minneapolis–Saint Paul. Churches were fundamental to the growth and connectivity of the community.

Founded in 1890 by Reverend Richmond Taylor, the congregation first met at Fourth Street and Fourth Avenue West. Soon afterward the congregation moved to a newly constructed building at 530 North Fifth Avenue East.

St. Mark's AME Church was the first and only building in Duluth built by Black residents, for Black residents. The church was built in the east Hillside neighborhood where the majority of Duluth's Black population lived, and the basement was completed in 1900. The structure's basement level accommodated the congregation until 1913, when the main level was completed. At this time, membership consisted of 12 permanent members and 13 probationary members, and reached 68 members by 1910. The church was one of two majority Black churches in Duluth, the other being Calvary Baptist Church.

The church features a two-story bell tower, Tudor Revival elements, and locally made stained-glass windows. The building was designed by Edwin Radcliffe, solo of his partnership with Charles McMillan. Funds were the church were raised by the Black community and from sympathetic White residents, and the Duluth Herald printed a public request for financial assistance to build the church.

Like many churches at the time, St. Mark's in the early 20th century offered the community a central space for religious, social, and political conversation and networking. The local Masonic Order, the Doric Masonic Lodge, had evolved from early church membership and frequently held meetings at the church. Membership there and in local black organizations overlapped.

At the time of St. Mark's construction, most African-American men in Duluth worked as janitors, waiters, porters, or dock or boat workers. A few independent barbershops and restaurants succeeded. Other employment came to Duluth via the U.S. Steel corporation.

St. Mark's growth in its early years paralleled the growth of the African-American population in Duluth, largely driven by job opportunities at U.S. Steel. In the early 1920s, the company recruited laborers—many from Southern states—to work at their plant in Morgan Park, a planned community near the edge of Duluth. Recruits found poor wages, unfamiliar weather, and discrimination upon arrival. Though their jobs were in Morgan Park, the company town, African-American employees could not live there. It was a whites-only community. Most blacks settled in Gary, which was also a company town, or the East Hillside neighborhood, near St. Mark's.

== NAACP history ==
After World War I, Duluth's Black residents faced stricter segregation and harsher discrimination. When the 1920 Duluth lynchings of three traveling black workers captured national attention, St. Mark's was proactive in response. Reverend William M. Majors of St. Mark's assisted in efforts to indict the lynchers. The NAACP provided legal and financial support for the proceedings.

Before the lynching, African Americans in Duluth were not convinced a local NAACP chapter was necessary. After the incident, some outraged and fearful blacks left Duluth altogether. Those who remained formed an NAACP chapter with 69 members, and St. Mark's provided gathering space for the new organization.

NAACP founder W. E. B. Du Bois was the chapter's first speaker. In March 1921, he came to St. Mark's and spoke in favor of Minnesota's pending anti-lynching law, which the state legislature passed the next month. Ethel Ray Nance, whose father helped establish the Duluth chapter and who became a civil rights leader in her own right, recalled in a 1974 interview that the church far exceeded its 250-person capacity when Du Bois came. She estimated that 75% of the crowd was white.

Throughout the 1930s, St. Mark's and Calvary Baptist hosted the Sunday Forum, which consisted of weekly discussions important to the local Black community. In 1938, Clarence Mitchell from the St. Paul Urban League spoke at St. Mark's. The church also established a scholarship fund for higher education, which still exists.

== Later history ==
Duluth's black population grew to about 900 by 1970. In 2014, it remained just under 2,000, or 2% of the city's total population. St. Mark's continues to be central to the community and attuned to racial issues in the 21st century. St. Mark's parishioners hosted a prayer vigil and bell-ringing for victims of the Charleston church shooting at Emanuel African Methodist Episcopal Church in South Carolina in June 2015.

In 1991, the church was added to the National Historic Register.

In 2025, the church celebrated 125 years of having a building in Duluth.

== See also ==
- List of Methodist churches in the United States
- National Register of Historic Places listings in St. Louis County, Minnesota
