= Annie Walker Blackwell =

American church worker

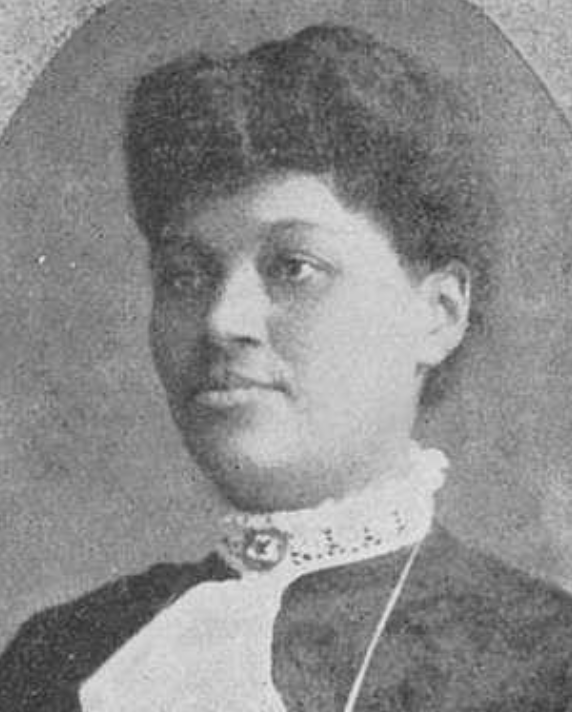
- Annie Walker Blackwell, from a 1912 publication
- Born: August 21, 1862; Chester, South Carolina, U.S.
- Died: December 7, 1922 (aged 60); Philadelphia, Pennsylvania, U.S.
- Occupations: Church worker, educator, suffragist, temperance worker, writer
- Spouse: George Lincoln Blackwell
- Father: Dublin Walker

Annie Walker Blackwell (August 21, 1862 – December 7, 1922) was an American church worker, suffragist, and writer. The Annie Walker Blackwell School for Women and Girls in Liberia was named in her memory.

== Early life and education ==
Walker was born in Chester, South Carolina, the daughter of Dublin Isaiah Walker and Matilda McConnell. Her father was a pastor and a state senator in South Carolina during Reconstruction. She graduated from Scotia Seminary in North Carolina, and attended Temple College.

== Career ==
=== Church work and teaching ===
Walker taught school in Charlotte, North Carolina in her teens. As a bishop's wife, Blackwell held a role of moral leadership in her community. She was national secretary of the Woman's Home and Foreign Missionary Society of the AME Zion denomination, from 1904 until her death in 1922. She led the staff auxiliary organization at Frederick Douglass Memorial Hospital, and chaired a committee of the Colored Women's Christian Association. "No woman in any Church can beat her planning for big things", commented the Missionary Seer publication about Blackwell, in 1917.

=== Writing ===
Blackwell published a hymnal, The Missionary Call (1911). She edited a column in the denomination's newsletter, Star of Zion. She wrote a pro-suffrage pamphlet, "The Responsibility and Opportunity of the Twentieth Century Woman", published in 1910, and contributed to suffrage and temperance publications.

== Publications ==
- The Responsibility and Opportunity of the Twentieth Century Woman (1910 pamphlet)
- The Missionary's Call (1911 hymnal)

== Personal life and legacy ==
In 1887, Walker married George Lincoln Blackwell, a bishop in the AME Zion Church. They had two children who both died in infancy. She died in 1922, in Philadelphia, at the age of 60. In 1933, the Annie Walker Blackwell School for Women and Girls opened in Liberia, named in tribute to Blackwell's work in the church. The missionary convention of the AME Zion Church sent a painted portrait of Blackwell to the school in Liberia in 1935, as a gift.
