= Charles McMillen =

Charles McMillen may refer to:

- Tom McMillen (Charles Thomas McMillen, born 1952), American politician
- Charles McMillen (architect) (1854–1911), Irish-born American architect
