= Oakfield Cemetery (Wantagh, New York) =

Historic cemetery in Nassau County, New York, US

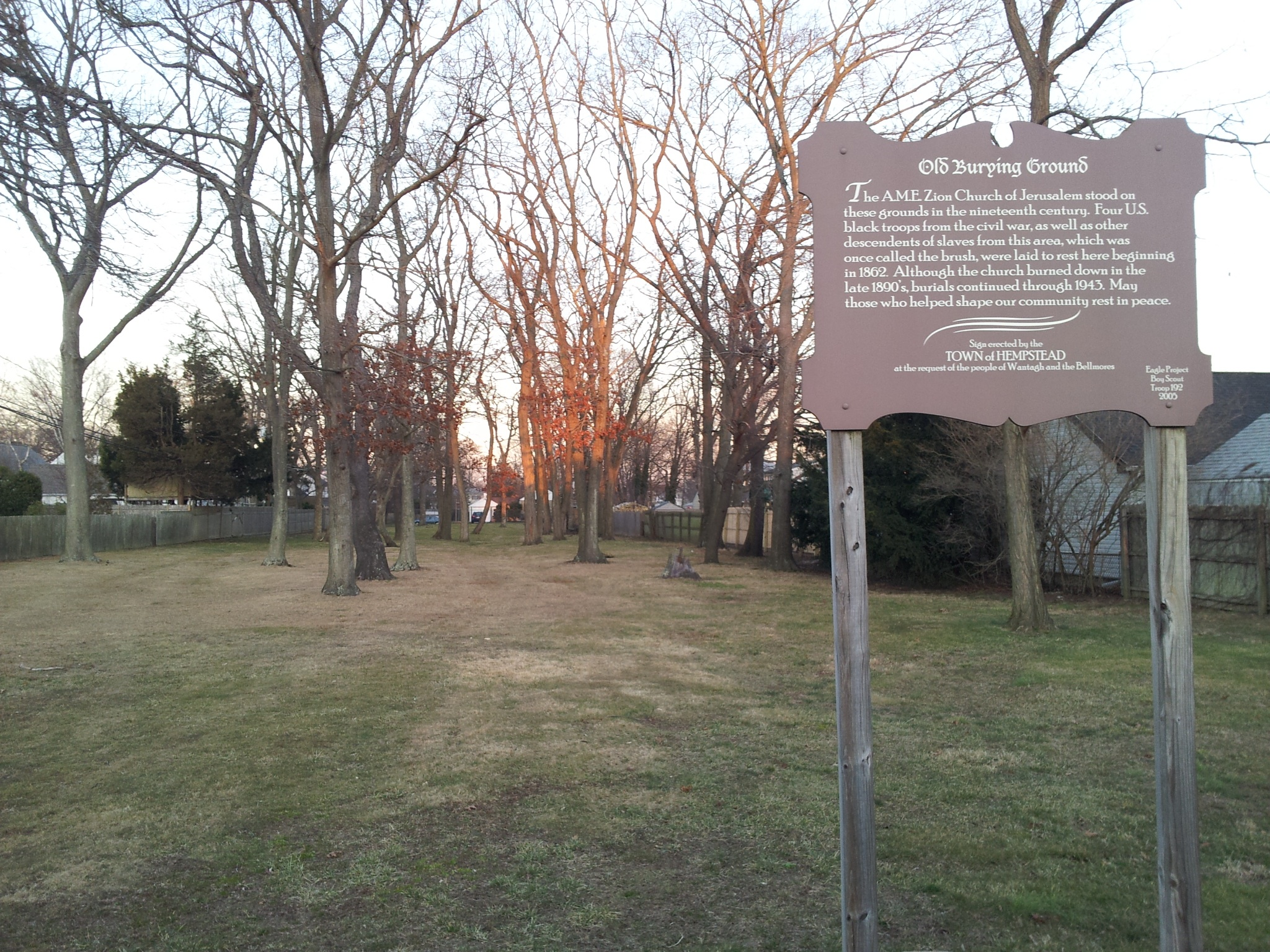

Details
- Established: 1851 (land deeded)
- Closed: 1943 (last burial recorded)
- Location: Wantagh, New York
- Country: United States
- Coordinates: 40°41′7.3″N 73°31′18.3″W
- Type: Private
- Owned by: Town of Hempstead
- No. of interments: 108 (recorded in church records)
- Find a Grave: Oakfield Cemetery

Oakfield Cemetery (also known as the Old Burying Ground) is a 70 X 438 tract of land located on Oakfield Avenue in Wantagh, New York, in the United States. It is covered with grass and lined with sporadically placed oak trees, and is surrounded by residential homes. Backyard fencing of homes also surrounds the land on both sides. The cemetery is now kept locked to keep vandals out. It was first deeded as a cemetery on March 18, 1851, and is noted as the second cemetery in the area to be used by Black residents of Wantagh, many of whom were descendants of freed Jackson family slaves. It is most noted as being the final resting place of four black Civil War soldiers. The Town of Hempstead takes care of this property. It is nicknamed by area residents as "Indian Burying Ground."

== History ==
The first person recorded as having been buried in the Old Burying Ground is J. Checker Jones, who died on September 1, 1862. Saint Matthias Church's records show the names of 108 individuals buried in the cemetery, two thirds of whom have the last name of Jackson, taken from the Jacksons who owned and freed their slaves. The last burial registered by the Town of Hempstead was of Charles Jackson, who died on June 17, 1943. The most notable people buried there are four black soldiers from Wantagh who served in the U.S. Army during the Civil War. The names of these soldiers are Morris Jackston (1841-March 11, 1887), Gilbert Jackson (1845-September 28, 1916), David C. Jackson (1839-Oct. 1, 1905) and Edward S. (or Sands E.) Jackson (1825-February 9, 1903). Unfortunately, due to vandalism that has taken place throughout history, the headstones for these four soldiers are the only ones that still remain in the entire cemetery and have been repositioned by the Town of Hempstead to lay flat, as this makes them harder to be stolen. As late as the 1960s, residents counted thirty-nine stones still standing, but vandals rapidly carried these all away.

== The Brush ==
The areas of Wantagh on one side and North Bellmore on the other side of the cemetery were long known as "The Brush" until the building boom which followed World War II, because it was a section of pine, oak, and scrub oak. The first black people to live on this land were slaves, but while slavery was not abolished in New York State until 1827, Long Island had freed its slaves more than a decade before this. This land was given by white people to the freed slaves in The Brush, and many of their descendants still live there today. Although these people have sold off much of this land over the years. The people of The Brush worked at a variety of occupations. Some raised cattle, horses, and other animals. Some were farmers or did landscaping. The people of The Brush had their own school, their own church, and the Old Burying Ground served as their cemetery.

== Indian Burying Ground ==
Although in the seventeenth century, the Meroke Indians (who the town of Merrick has been named for) , who also inhabited this area, had a village on a nearby site which is now Cherrywood School, they did not bury their dead in what is now Oakfield Cemetery (Old Burying Ground). Area residents believe that some of the Blacks of The Brush area married Indians and their offspring are buried in Oakfield Cemetery. The present day Blacks say that the Indian blood of those buried in the Old Burying Ground is a mixture of Mokawk and Shinnecock.

== Jackson family ==
The Brush had shown little evidence of slavery after the Revolutionary War. One reason for this was that the Jacksons and other White families of the area were Quakers and were opposed to slavery. They not only freed their own slaves but they also frequently purchased slaves in order to free them.

== Church ==
The people of The Brush had a house of worship on the site of the Old Burying Ground in 1845, some years before the land was deeded to them. The church was made up of forty-seven members, and was an African Methodist Episcopal Zion Church. The church later changed to New Light Baptist Church, and in 1892, it changed to St. Paul's African Methodist Episcopal Church. The church then burned to the ground in a fire that took place in the 1890s. A collection was later taken up by a man who taught Sunday school in The Brush and a philanthropist built St. Matthias Episcopal Church on a nearby tract of land in 1904. St. Matthias Episcopal Church still stands at the intersection of Jerusalem Avenue and Oakfield in Wantagh, New York.
