= Sarah Dudley Pettey =

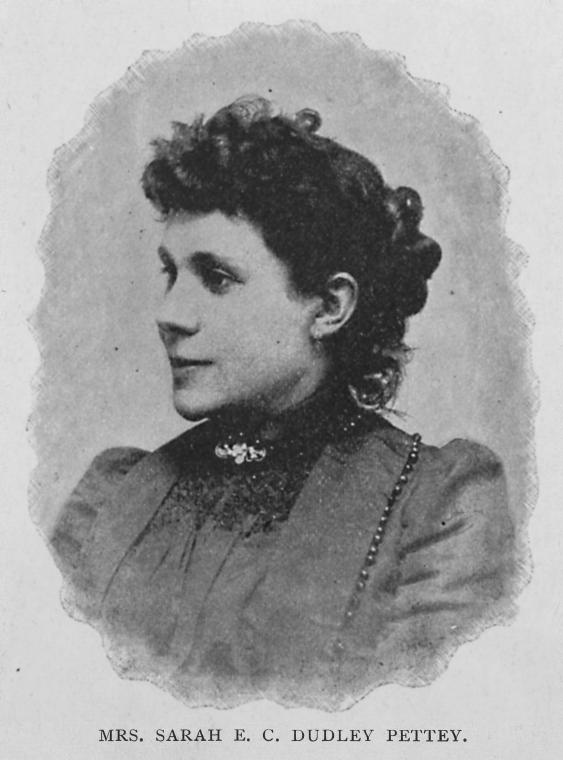
- Sarah Dudley Pettey, 1895
- Born: 1869
- Died: 1906 (aged 36–37)
- Occupation: Political Activist

Sarah Dudley Pettey (1869-1906) was an African-American educator, writer, organist, and political activist in North Carolina. She devoted her life and career to increasing gender and racial equality, Christian temperance, and women's participation in the state's public sphere during the Jim Crow era.

== Early life ==
Sarah Dudley Pettey was born in 1869 in New Bern, North Carolina to Caroline Dudley and Edward R. Dudley. Her father was a prominent politician and writer.

She attended New Bern Public Schools through the sixth grade. She next attended the New Bern State Colored Normal School. At the age of thirteen, she attended Scotia Seminary in Concord, North Carolina, a school staffed and taught by northern white teachers. She graduated from Scotia with distinction in June 1883 and returned to New Bern to teach.

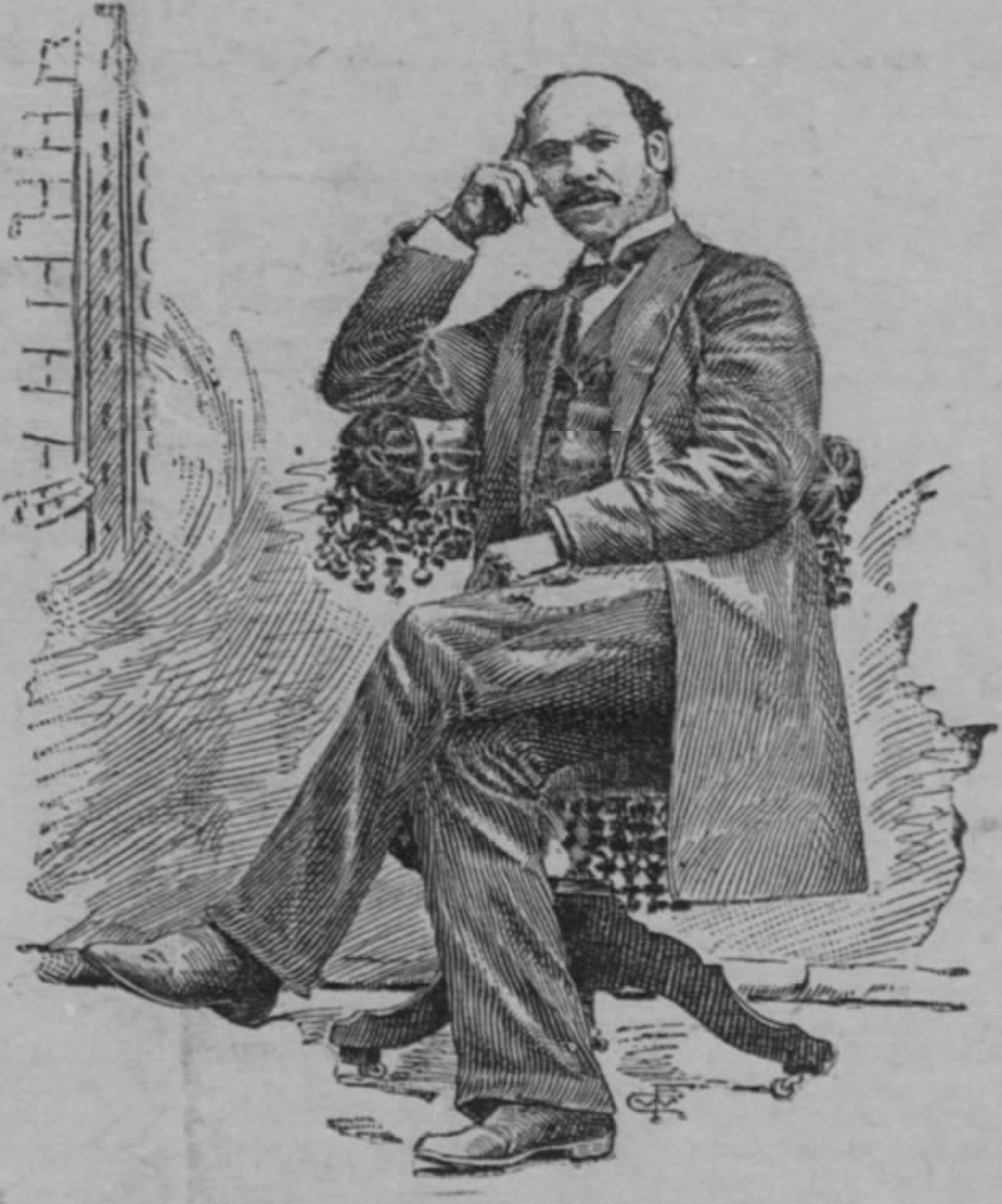
Sketch of C. C. Pettey, husband of Sarah Dudley

Dudley married Charles Pettey in 1889. Pettey had two daughters with Lula Pickenpack, Dudley's roommate at Scotia. After Lula died, Dudley and Pettey married. Charles Pettey was a bishop in the African Methodist Episcopal Zion church. They had 5 children.

== Career ==
Pettey held several teaching positions throughout her career. In October 1883, she was an assistant at the New Bern Graded School where she was promoted to vice principal, occupying the post until 1889.

== Activism ==
In 1896, Sarah Dudley Pettey became involved in the National Association of Colored Women's Clubs. Also in 1896, she began writing a bimonthly column in the Star of Zion, the newspaper of the A.M.E. Zion church. She also served as the church's General Secretary for the Woman's Home and Foreign Missionary Society.

In her writings, she exhibited a progressive vision of women's rights and equality. Historian Glenda Elizabeth Gilmore notes that Dudley Pettey often traveled and preached with her husband, speaking in on “'Woman the Equal of Man' or 'Woman's Suffrage...'. She frequently wrote in the Star of Zion about women's accomplishments."

== Death ==
Charles Pettey died in 1900, and Sarah Dudley Pettey died in 1906 at age thirty seven. Their deaths coincided with the establishment of the Jim Crow system and the full disenfranchisement of African Americans in the South.
