= Mildred Mitchell-Bateman =

African-American psychiatrist and medical administrator (1922–2012)

- Born: Mildred Mitchell; 1922; Brunswick, Georgia
- Died: January 25, 2012 (aged 89–90); Charleston, West Virginia
- Education: Barber-Scotia College; Johnson C. Smith University; Women's Medical College of Pennsylvania
- Occupations: Physician and medical administrator
- Spouse: William L. Bateman

Dr. Mildred Mitchell-Bateman, M.D. (1922 – January 25, 2012) was an American physician and medical administrator. She was West Virginia's mental health commissioner in 1962, and was the first woman and first African-American to hold the position.

== Life ==
In 1922, Mitchell-Bateman was born in Brunswick, Georgia, to a minister and a registered nurse. From 1937 to 1939, Mitchell-Bateman attended Barber-Scotia College in Concord, North Carolina, and Johnson C. Smith University in Charlotte, North Carolina. In 1941, she graduated from Johnson C. Smith University. In 1946, she received her medical degree from the Women's Medical College of Pennsylvania. On December 25, 1947, she married William L. Bateman who was a therapist from Parkesburg, Pennsylvania. Mitchell-Bateman continued to practice medicine until her death at age 89 on January 25, 2012, from illness.

== Career ==
Mitchell-Bateman began her career in 1947 at Lakin State Hospital, which at the time was West Virginia's mental health hospital for black patients. She was hired as a staff physician at Lakin while on an internship at the hospital. She left Lakin for Topeka, Kansas, to open her own practice and spent 3 years studying at the Meringer School of Psychiatry. In 1955 she returned to Lakin as the Lakin State Hospital's Clinical Director. In 1958, she was named the superintendent of the hospital.

In 1962, she was appointed director of the Department of Mental Health in West Virginia by Governor W. W. Barron. This was a high-ranking position in the government of the state of West Virginia, and she was the first African American, and the first woman, to achieve such an appointment. She held the position for fifteen years. During this time Mitchell-Bateman used her position to help explore women's mental health issues. For example, in 1973 she chaired a committee that explored the health effects that abortions had on women. After examining years of data, the committee concluded that legal abortions were safer for women and that if the abortion is done within the first trimester of pregnancy there is "little damage done to the woman's health or psyche." After leaving her position in 1977 she became a faculty member at Marshall University's School of Medicine, and was named chair of the Psychology Department. She taught at Marshall until 1982. In 1985 she was appointed the Associate Clinical Director at Huntington State Hospital in Huntington, West Virginia, and in 1996 she was made the Clinical Director of the same hospital. She would serve in this role until her retirement in 2000. In 1999, the Huntington State Hospital was renamed the Mildred Mitchell-Bateman Hospital in her honor by Governor Cecil Underwood.

Outside her service to the state of West Virginia, she also worked to better the field of mental health nationally. In 1973, she became the vice president of the American Psychiatric Association. She was the first African-American to do so. In 1977, then-President Jimmy Carter chose her to serve on his Commission on Mental Health, this work led to the Mental Health Systems Act of 1980.

Mitchell-Bateman was described as being "soft-spoken and unassuming, as well as "having a non-confrontational style of leadership." Despite her reserved nature she was able to profoundly impact the study of mental health in the state of West Virginian and across the United States. She overcame discrimination of both her race and gender to become a leader in the Psychiatric community. After her retirement she lived in Charleston, WV until she died there in 2012 at the age of 89.

== Awards and honors ==
Mitchell-Bateman received many awards and honors in recognition of her work. In 1974, Mitchell-Bateman received special recognition from the National Medical Association's Section on Psychiatry and Neurology. In 1995, she received the E.Y. Williams Distinguished Clinical Scholar's Award. She received the Wyeth-Ayerst Physician Award in 1996. In 2000, she received a Lifetime Achievement Award from the American Psychiatric Association. She also received the Governor's Award for Civil Rights Contributions in 2004.

As well as honorary degrees from:

- Johnson C. Smith University in Charlotte, North Carolina (1963)
- West Virginia State College in Institute, West Virginia (1969)
- Alderson Broaddus College in Philippi, West Virginia (1970)
- Bethany College in Bethany, West Virginia (1971)
- West Virginia Wesleyan College in Buckhannon, West Virginia (1972)
