= Mayesville Industrial and Educational Institute =

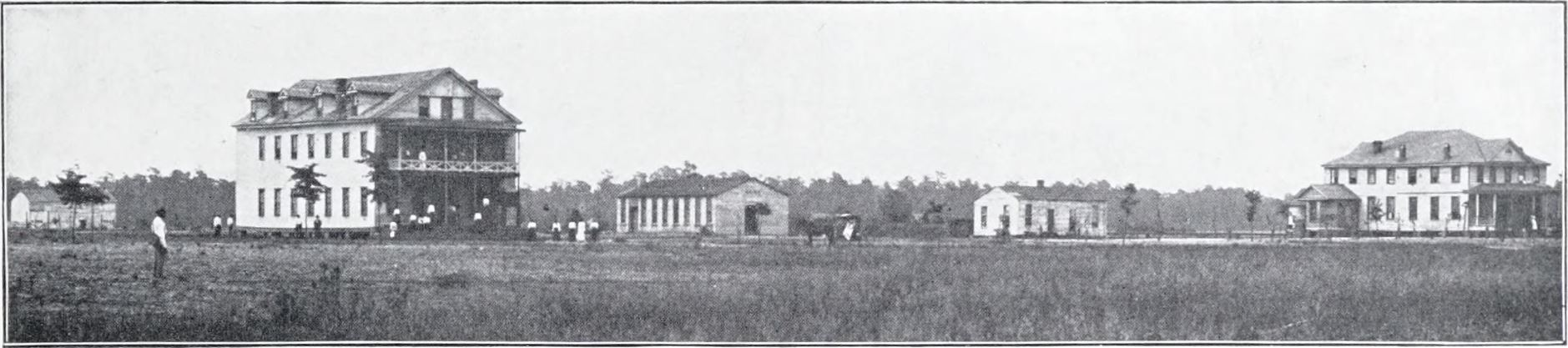
The institute, c. 1910

Mayesville Industrial and Educational Institute was a school for African-American children in Mayesville, South Carolina. It was established and run by Emma Jane Wilson, an African American.

== Background ==
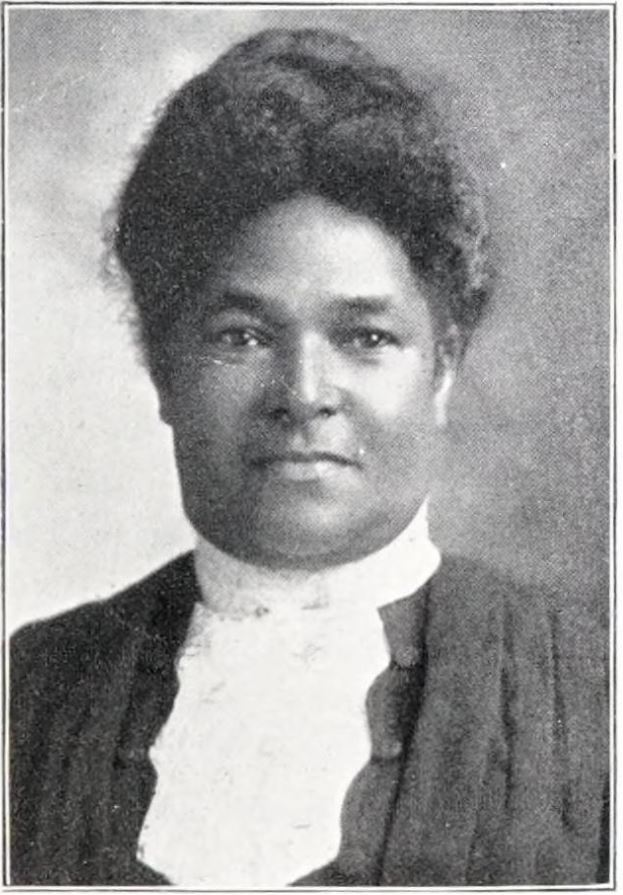
Emma J. Wilson

Wilson was educated at Goodwill Parochial School in Mayesville and then Scotia Seminary in North Carolina.

She taught at the Presbyterian Trinity Mission School in Mayesville which preceded Mayesville Institute. While at the school, she was Mary McLeod Bethune's first teacher, and later arranged for her to attend Scotia Seminary.

Wilson was elected president of the annual Mayesville farmers conference around 1909.

== Mayesville Institute history ==
After graduating from Scotia Seminary, Wilson founded the Mayesville Institute in 1882 to serve African-American children. The school first began operating in a ginhouse shed. It focused on teaching trade skills to young girls and boys, including shoe-making, carpentry, blacksmithing, sewing, and cooking. For the first 10 years, the school ran without outside funding. In 1896, the school was incorporated.

In 1895, Wilson met Louis Klopsch, the head of the Christian Herald newspaper, while fundraising in New York; after their meeting, Klopsch made the school one of the newspaper's "signature charities", and helped to raise money for the school. Klopsch became treasurer for the school's building fund, holding the role for several years, and later became a trustee. The Mayesville Educational Association helped fund Wilson's work at the school.

In 1909, the school had four buildings and 54 acres of land, including a school farm. That year, 550 students boarded at the school. At one point, Joslyn Hall was among the buildings on its campus.

Wilson died in 1924, but the school continued. In the 1950s, what was left of the school was acquired by the state of South Carolina and an elementary school constructed.
