= W. Gertrude Brown =

American educator and administrator

- Born: 1888; Charlotte, North Carolina, U.S.
- Died: 1949 (aged 60–61)
- Other name: Willie G. Brown
- Occupations: Social worker, educator

Willie Gertrude Brown (1888–1949) was an American educator and social worker. She is best known as the first head resident of the Phyllis Wheatley Settlement House in Minneapolis, Minnesota.

== Biography ==
Brown was born in Charlotte, North Carolina in 1888. Brown attended Scotia Seminary. She graduated in 1911, and went on to teach in Charlotte for six years. In 1919 she relocated to Dayton, Ohio where she worked at the Linden Community Center.

Brown continued her education as she pursued her career. She studied at the Agricultural and Technical College of North Carolina, the Cheyney University of Pennsylvania, the Hampton Institute, and then earned a B.S. from Columbia University in 1923.

In 1924 Brown move to Minneapolis, Minnesota where she became the first Head Resident of the Phyllis Wheatley Settlement House The settlement house was founded in 1924 for the city's African American community. Brown was instrumental in growing the Settlement House as a place for the African American community at a time when both the city of Minneapolis was still segregated and the Harlem Renaissance movement was flourishing. She hosted meetings for Pullman porters to discuss unionization and offered shelter to those unfairly targeted by the police. Brown resigned in 1937 following tensions between Brown and the Board of Directors of the Settlement House.

Brown moved to Washington, D.C. and died in an automobile accident in 1949.

Brown was the subject of the 1999 documentary The Heart of Bassett Place: W. Gertrude Brown and the Wheatley House.
