= Marie L. Clinton =

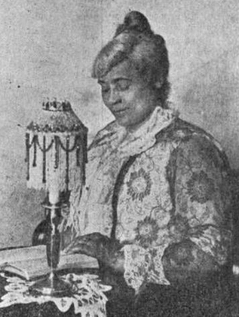
- Marie L. Clinton, from a 1922 publication.
- Born: 1871; Huntsville, Alabama
- Died: January 9, 1934 (aged 62–63); Tuskegee Institute Hospital, Birmingham
- Occupations: Church leader, educator, singer
- Known for: Founder, superintendent of the Buds of Promise Juvenile Mission Society
- Spouse: Bishop George Wylie Clinton

Marie Louise Clay Clinton (1871 – January 9, 1934) was an American educator, singer, and church leader. She was the founder and superintendent of the Buds of Promise Juvenile Mission Society, under the Women's Home and Overseas Missionary Society (WH&OMS) of the African Methodist Episcopal Zion Church (A.M.E. Zion Church).

== Early life and education ==
Marie Louise Clay was born in 1871, in Huntsville, Alabama, the daughter of Alfred Clay and Eliza Clay She trained as a teacher at the Central Alabama Academy, and studied music at Clark Atlanta University, graduating in 1891.

== Career ==
Clay taught school in Hot Springs, Birmingham, and Huntsville. She was also "a soloist of national repute", and toured for a year with a troupe of jubilee singers.

After marriage, she was active as a bishop's wife and church leader in her own right. She represented A.M.E. Zion women at an international gathering of Methodists in London in 1901. From her base in Charlotte, North Carolina, Clinton served as superintendent of the national Buds of Promise Juvenile Mission Society, from its founding in 1904 to 1932. She traveled and spoke at churches, and encouraged local congregations to start chapters of the children's program.

From 1921 to 1931, she was head of the Industrial Home for Colored Girls at Efland, North Carolina.

== Personal life and legacy ==
In 1901, Marie Louise Clay married George Wylie Clinton, a Bishop of the A.M.E. Zion Church, as his second wife. She was widowed in 1921 and she died after a long illness in 1934, aged 62 years, at the Tuskegee Institute Hospital.

The Buds of Promise program continued to grow in the decades after Clinton's death. Since 1951, churches in the A.M.E. Zion denomination mark the fourth Sunday in January as "Marie L. Clinton Day".
