= Star of Zion =

Christian periodical

Star of Zion is the official publication of the A.M.E. Zion church. First published in 1876 it is among the oldest African American publications in North Carolina and the oldest continuously published.

== History ==
For many years Star of Zion was published as a newspaper. The site of its publication changed several times in its early years, but since 1894 it has been published in Charlotte. The paper had a Republican affiliation prior to Franklin D. Roosevelt’s presidency in the 1930s.

A publication called The Zion Church Advocate was planned initially but never printed.

John Campbell Dancy and George W. Clinton served as business managers for the paper.

== Editors and contributors ==
Editors have included Bishop William J. Walls (1920s), Walter R. Lovell (1960s), and Reverend M.B. Robinson (1970s).

Sarah Dudley Pettey wrote articles for the paper.

== Archived issues ==
The University of North Carolina Libraries have many editions of the newspaper digitized and available online. The American Theological Library Association has a collection of the newspaper’s editions on microfilm.

== Website ==
- Star of Zion website
