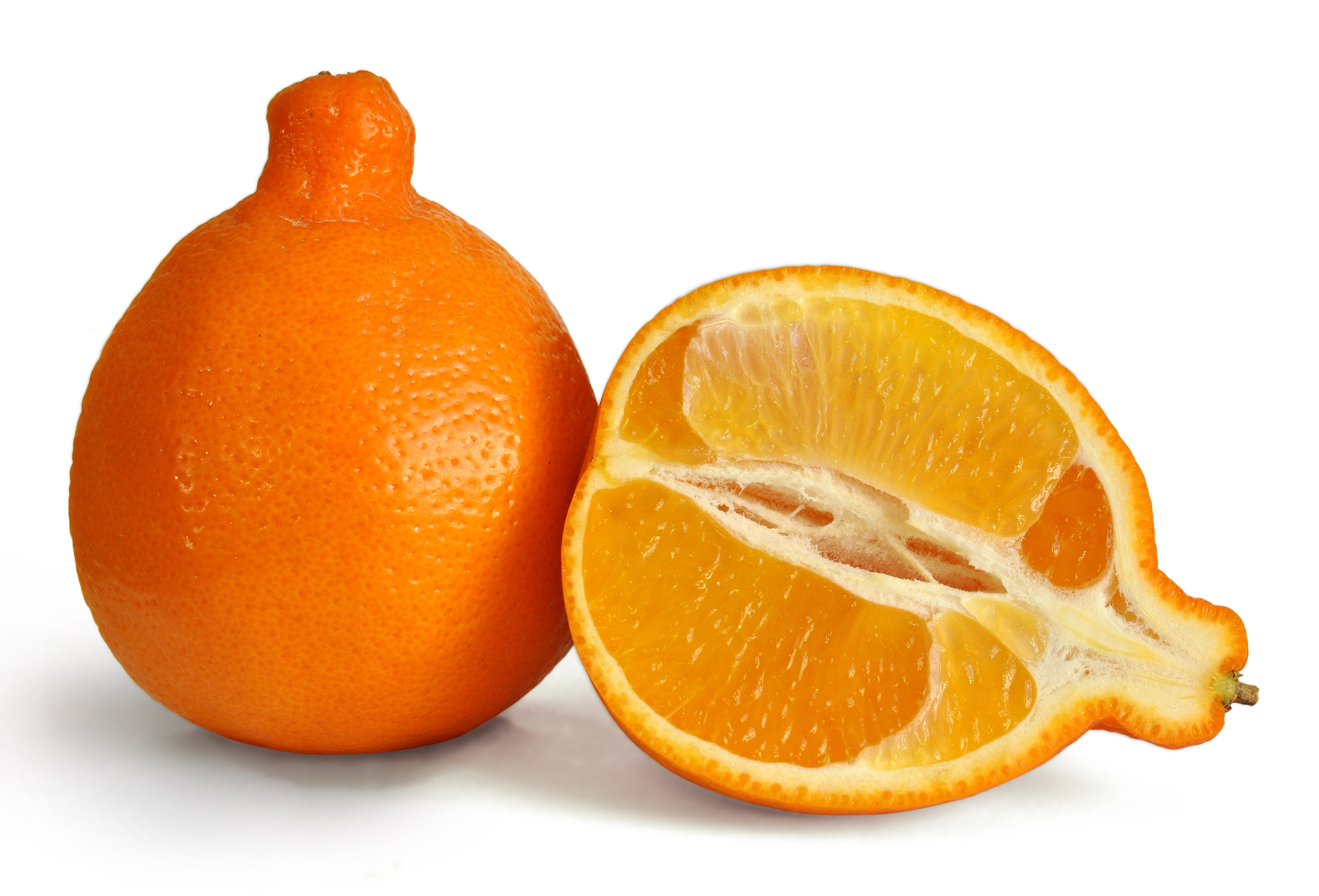
- A tangelo fruit (Cushman Honeybells)

Scientific classification
- Kingdom: Plantae
- Clade: Tracheophytes
- Clade: Angiosperms
- Clade: Eudicots
- Clade: Rosids
- Order: Sapindales
- Family: Rutaceae
- Genus: Citrus
- Species: C. × tangelo

Binomial name
- Citrus × tangelo J.W. Ingram & H.E. Moore, 1975

= Tangelo =

Citrus fruit hybrid

The tangelo (/ˈtændʒəloʊ/ TAN-jə-loh, /tænˈdʒɛloʊ/ tan-JEL-oh; C. reticulata × C. maxima or × C. paradisi), Citrus × tangelo, is a citrus fruit hybrid of a Citrus reticulata variety, such as mandarin orange or tangerine, and a Citrus maxima variety, such as a pomelo or grapefruit. The name is a portmanteau of 'tangerine' and 'pomelo'.

Tangelos are the size of an adult fist, have a tart and tangy taste, and are juicy (with less flesh inside). They generally have loose skin and are easier to peel than oranges, readily distinguished from them by a characteristic bump at the stem. Tangelos can be used as a substitute for mandarin oranges or sweet oranges.

== Varieties ==
=== Orlando ===
The early maturing Orlando tangelo is noted for its rich juiciness, mild and sweet flavor, large size, distinct zesty smell, and flat-round shape without a characteristic knob. Orlando tangelos are available from mid-November to the beginning of February. The tangelo originated as a cross between a Duncan grapefruit and a Dancy tangerine. Walter Tennyson Swingle of the United States Department of Agriculture (USDA) is credited with creating the hybrid in 1911. When the Orlando tangelo was first cultivated, it was known by the name Lake tangelo. The trees of this variety grow to a large size and are easily recognized by their cup-shaped leaves. Orlando tangelos are recognized as one of the more cold-tolerant varieties.

=== Minneola ===
The Minneola tangelo, also known as the Honeybell, is a cross between a Duncan grapefruit and a Dancy tangerine and was released in 1931 by the USDA Horticultural Research Station in Orlando. It is named after Minneola, Florida. Most Minneola tangelos are characterized by a stem-end neck, which tends to make the fruit appear bell-shaped. Because of this, it is also called the Honeybell in the gift fruit trade. Minneolas are usually fairly large, typically 3–3 1/2 inches (76–89 mm) in diameter. The peel color, when mature, is a bright reddish-orange color, and the rind of the Minneola is relatively thin. Minneolas peel rather easily and are very juicy. The Minneola is not strongly self-fruitful, and yields will be greater when interplanted with suitable pollenizers such as Temple tangor, Sunburst tangerine, or possibly Fallglo tangerine. It tends to bear a good crop every other year.

=== Jamaican tangelo ===
The Jamaican tangelo, marketed under proprietary names 'ugli fruit' and 'uniq fruit,' is a spontaneous hybrid discovered about 1920 on the island of Jamaica, with a rough, wrinkled, greenish-yellow rind. Its exact parentage has not been determined, but it is thought to be a tangerine/grapefruit hybrid.

=== K-Early (Sunrise) ===
A hybrid propagated by Walter Tennyson Swingle and Herbert John Webber, the K-Early is an early-ripening cultivar that gained a bad reputation at first but has been increasing in popularity in recent years. It is sometimes called 'Sunrise,' a name also used for a different and older cultivar.

=== Mapo ===
The Mapo (a portmanteau between 'Mandarino' and the Italian word for grapefruit, 'Pompelmo') is a hybrid developed in 1950 in Italy by the Italian Ministry of Agriculture Citrus Research Station of Acireale. In Italy, the Mapo matures at the end of summer, about two months earlier than most citruses. Its peel is green, smooth, and thin; yellow markings appear when fully ripened. Its pulp is yellow, with orange nuances also when fully ripened. It is a cross between the 'Avana' mandarin and the Duncan grapefruit.

=== Seminole ===
The seminole is a hybrid between a 'Bowen' grapefruit and a 'Dancy' tangerine. It is deep red-orange in color, oblate in shape with a thin and firm peel, and is not necked. It has 11–13 juicy segments and a pleasant, subacid flavor. It has 20–25 small seeds. The tree is high-yielding and scab-resistant.

=== Thornton ===
A tangerine-grapefruit hybrid developed by Walter Tennyson Swingle in 1899, the Thornton is oblate to obovate, slightly rough, and medium to large in size. The peel is light orange and is of medium thickness; the pulp inside is pale to deep orange. It has 10–12 juicy segments and a rich subacid to sweet flavor. There are 10–25 slender seeds inside. It ripens from December to March. The tree is high-yielding and is well-adapted to hot and dry regions, although the fruit ships poorly.

=== Novel varieties ===
In 2011, a troop of baboons was attracted to the higher sweetness of a new likely mutation in a Minneola planting in Cape Town, South Africa, prompting its propagation.

== Drug interactions unlikely ==
One study thus far has shown that, unlike grapefruit, interactions with statins are not likely with tangelos. Although the tangelo is derived from a grapefruit crossed with a mandarin, the furocoumarins in grapefruit are not expressed in tangelos.
