= Ida Van Smith =

American aviator (1917–2003)

Ida Van Smith (March 21, 1917 – March 13, 2003) was an African-American pilot and flight instructor born in 1917.

== Personal life ==
Ida Van Larkin was born in Lumberton, North Carolina on March 21, 1917.

Smith was the youngest of three children and grew up in a loving and sheltered environment. Her mother was African-American and her father was of mixed ethnicity. Her family was very religious and attended church services on a regular basis. Smith's interest in aviation began when she was a child. She took an interest in barnstorming and wing-walking exhibitions in Lumberton.

She married Edward D. Smith and moved to New York City. She and her husband raised four children.

Ida Van Smith's second husband was Benjamin E. Dunn.

== Education ==
Smith graduated from Redstone Academy in 1934 as the valedictorian of her class. She studied at Barber Scotia Junior College in Concord, North Carolina and then attended Shaw University in Raleigh, North Carolina. She graduated with a major in social studies and a minor in mathematics. Smith earned a scholarship to the City College of New York where she earned a Master of Science degree in 1964. In 1967, Smith went to the LaGuardia Airport to take her first lesson in a single-engine airplane. She then studied at an airport in Fayetteville, North Carolina. Smith became a licensed pilot, instrument rated which means that she was allowed to fly during inclement weather, and ground instructor.

== Career ==
After receiving her M.S. from the City College of New York, Smith worked as a teacher for two years in North Carolina. After marrying Edward D. Smith, Ida continued to teach in Queens, New York. She taught in the New York City public schools for many years before enrolling in her first flying lesson at the age of fifty. After becoming a licensed pilot in 1967, Smith founded the Ida Van Smith Flight Clubs to introduce children to careers in aviation and aerospace. Adults were allowed into the program by special request. She taught her students using a stationary airplane instrument panel in her living room. Her program was then expanded into public schools and started an introductory aviation course for adults at York College. Volunteers from varying areas in aviation give her classes tours of airplanes and airports. They also take her students flying and give lectures and demonstrations appropriate to each age group. Children in the program along with their parents fly in small airplanes, seaplanes, and helicopters. They visited aerospace museums and Federal Aviation Administration (FAA) installations. Students in the program learn the controls, functions of the instruments, and what makes a plane fly by sitting in Smith's own Cessna 172 cockpit. Students also got to meet airline pilots, flight attendants, air traffic controllers, meteorologists, aircraft mechanics and others whose jobs pertain to the aviation industry. At first, she used personal funds to establish her flight clubs. Now she receives funding from corporate and private donations and volunteer efforts. Ida Van Smith headed eleven Flight Clubs located in New York, Texas, and St. Lucia but there would eventually be more than 20 clubs across the United States.

Photographs and story lines of Smith's appear in the Smithsonian National Air and Space Museum with the Tuskegee Airmen's Black Wings in The Pentagon and in the International Women's Air and Space Museum in Cleveland, Ohio.

In 1978-79, the FAA funded Smith's aviation career programs for three high schools in New York and New Jersey. Later on, these programs were adopted by the FAA.

Smith designed an aviation-oriented coloring book for children. She produced and hosted a cable television show on aviation. She also produced and published five booklets on the history of her flight clubs. She spoke about aviation at schools, churches and museums.

Ida Van Smith was a member of Tuskegee Airman's Black Wings, Negro Airman International, and the Ninety-Nines.

Smith died in her hometown on March 13, 2003.

== Awards and honors ==
- 1978: World Aerospace Education Organization Award from the International Women's Conference.
- 1979: Bishop Wright Air Industry Award.
- 1984: first African-American woman to be inducted into the International Forest of Friendship.
- 1997, included in National Air and Space Museum's exhibit "Women in Flight".
- Award for Achievement, Ninety-Nines'

== Personal life ==
Smith was the paternal grandmother of soul singer Sy Smith.

== Sources ==
- Darlene Clark Hine; Elisa Barkley Brown; Rosalyn Terborg-Penn (1993). Black Women in America: A Historical Encyclopedia. Carlson Publishing.
