= George Lincoln Blackwell =

American author and bishop

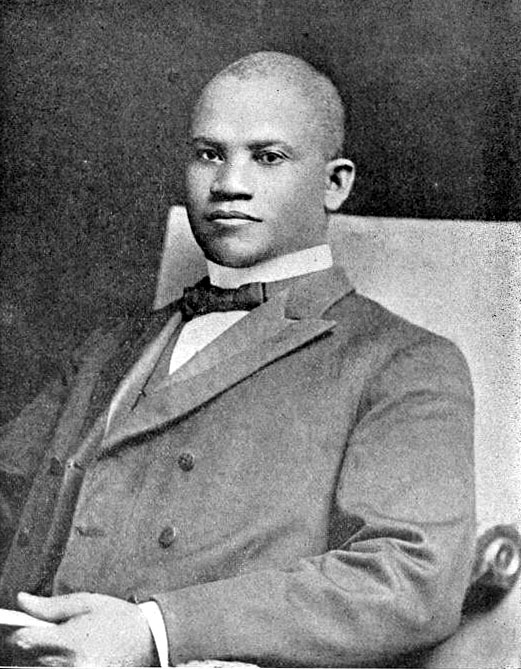
- c. 1910

George Lincoln Blackwell (2 July 1861 – 20 March 1926) was an African American author and bishop of the African Methodist Episcopal Zion Church.

== Biography ==
Born in Henderson, North Carolina as the son of slaves, Blackwell graduated from Livingstone College, Salisbury, North Carolina, in 1888, and from Boston University School of Theology, in 1892. He served as dean of Livingstone College Theological School of the African Methodist Episcopal Zion Church from 1893 to 1896, as general agent of the denominational publishing house and editor from 1896 to 1900, as general secretary 1900 to 1904, and as combined with missionary secretary from 1904 to 1908. He became a bishop in 1908. Blackwell also served the delegate of his church to the Ecumenical Councils at London in 1907 and at Toronto in 1911.

Blackwell married Annie Walker (1862–1922), daughter of South Carolina state senator Dublin Walker, in 1887. She supported his work, and held leadership positions in the church as well. She wrote a pro-suffrage pamphlet, and published a hymnal. They had two children, who both died in infancy.

== Works ==
- The Model Homestead (1893)
- Cloaks for Sin (1904)
- A Man Wanted (1907)
