= Franklin D. Dancy =

North Carolina reconstruction era American politician

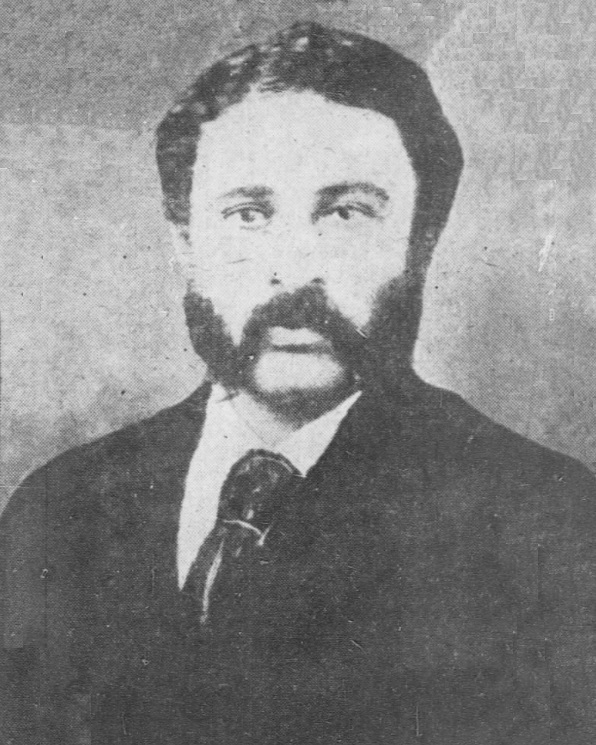
- Portrait of Dancy, c. 1880

Member of the North Carolina Senate from the 5th district
- In office August 1, 1878 – August 5, 1880
- Preceded by: William P. Mabson
- Succeeded by: W. P. Williamson

Personal details
- Born: 1840 Edgecombe County, North Carolina, U.S.
- Died: October 16, 1907 (aged 66–67) Tarboro, North Carolina, U.S.
- Party: Republican
- Relations: John C. Dancy (brother)

Franklin D. Dancy (1840 – October 16, 1907) was a Reconstruction era blacksmith, mayor and politician who served in the North Carolina Senate.

== Biography ==
Dancy was born enslaved and was owned by an Edgecombe County planter. His brother was John C. Dancy a politician, journalist and educator.

He served as a member of the Tarboro Board of Commissioners for two years during the Reconstruction era and then two years as a county commissioner for Edgecombe County.

In 1879 he was elected to serve in the North Carolina Senate and was elected as the mayor of Tarboro in 1882, being the first black mayor of that town.

Dancy was the chairman for the Republican district executive committee from 1880 until 1882, and in 1896 he was elected as a justice of the peace.

Both Dancy and his brother John are mentioned in the inscription on the historical marker at the St. Paul A.M.E. Zion Church in Tarboro.

Dancy died in Tarboro on October 16, 1907.

== See also ==
- African American officeholders from the end of the Civil War until before 1900
