= Dancy (citrus) =

Citrus fruit and plant

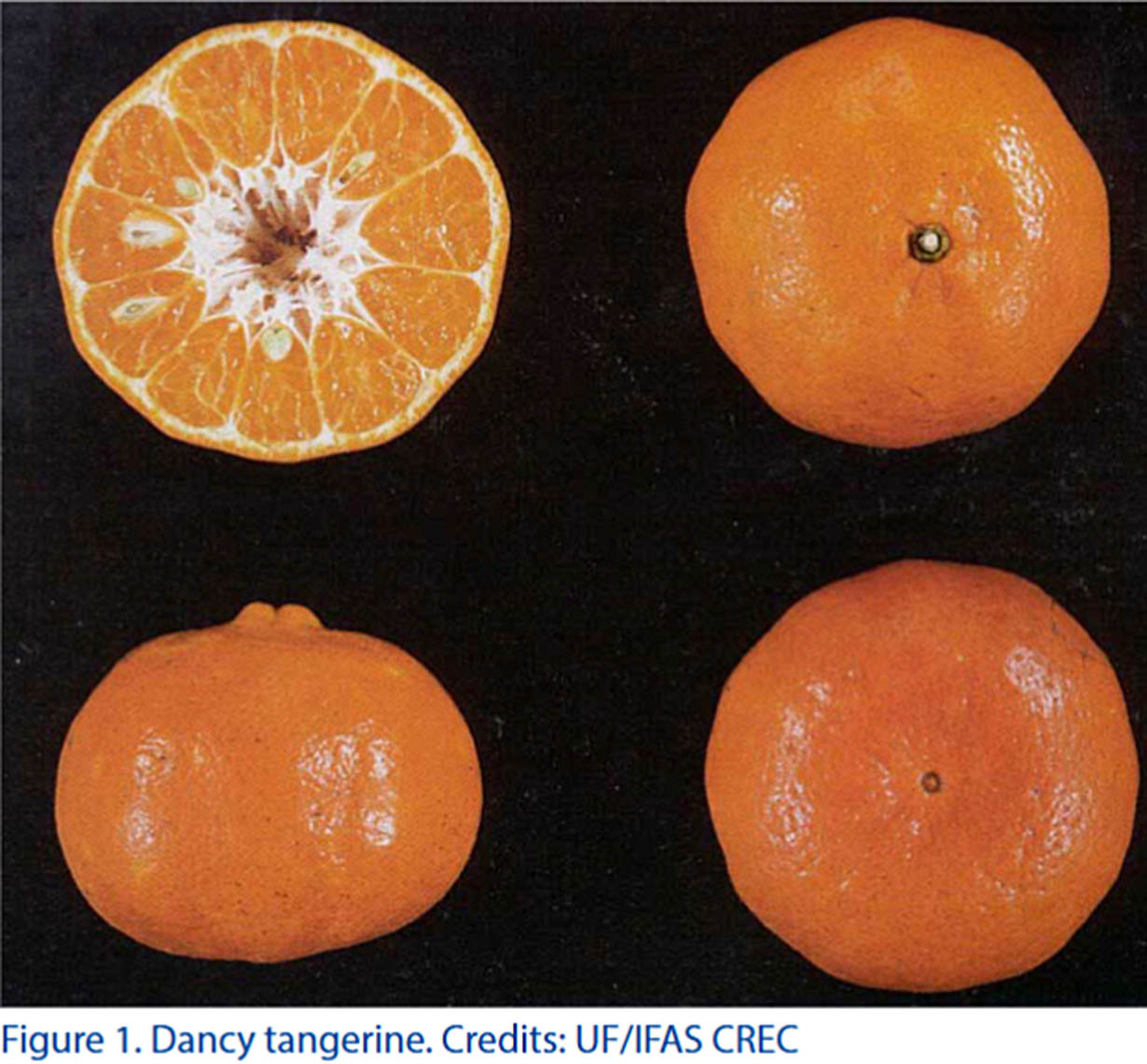
- Species: Citrus reticulata
- Cultivar: 'Dancy'
- Marketing names: zipper-skin tangerine, kid-glove orange
- Origin: Orange Mills, Florida, United States

The Dancy tangerine (zipper-skin tangerine, kid-glove orange) is one of the oldest and formerly most popular American citrus varieties, but is now rarely sold.

The Dancy originated in 1867, as a seedling grown by Colonel Francis L. Dancy. It was called tangerine because its parent, the Moragne tangerine, was believed to come from Morocco ("Tangerine" meaning from Tangier).

It has an intense, medium-sweet flavour, and its juice is more strongly-flavoured than orange juice. It is known (and sometimes named) for its loose, pliable peel, which is mainly orange flavedo, with very little bitter white mesocarp (also called albedo or pith). This allows the peel to be eaten fresh and used to flavour dishes like tangerine beef. The Dancy may be a pure mandarin, unlike many commercial citrus cultivars, which are hybrids.

== Classification ==
Chōzaburō Tanaka classified the Dancy in Citrus tangerina; he thought it was similar or identical to the obenimikan of Japan, and close to the Keonla and Ladu mandarins of India. Under the Swingle classification, the Dancy is classed in Citrus reticulata, the mandarin group.

== Commercial decline ==
Until the 1970s, most tangerines grown and eaten in the US were Dancys. It is no longer widely commercially grown; it is too delicate to ship well, it is susceptible to Alternaria fungus, and it bears more heavily in alternate years; the thin skin also transpires in storage, and it was difficult to harvest mechanically. Some hybrids are also more cold-hardy than Dancy.

2012 was the first year since 1874 that no Dancys were sold on the US market. The cultivar is still widely sold by nurseries for backyard planting.

== Hybrid descendants ==
The Dancy is a parent of many hybrid cultivars.

=== Pomelo hybrids ===
- Minneola
- Orlando
- Sampson
- Seminole

=== Orange hybrids ===
- Dweet tangor
- Mency tangor
- Pixie
- Frua (backcrossed with a Pixie)

The Dancy has been thought to be the pollen parent of the Orri and Fortune hybrids, but this is not upheld by genetic tests.
