= Mervyn C. Alleyne =

Mervyn Coleridge Alleyne (Trinidad and Tobago, 13 June 1933 - 23 November 2016) was a sociolinguist, creolist and dialectologist whose work focused on the creole languages of the Caribbean.

He attended Queen's Royal College in Port-of-Spain and later won a scholarship to the fledgling University College of the West Indies, Mona, Jamaica which he entered in 1953. After graduating from Mona, Alleyne obtained a PhD from the University of Strasbourg, France. He returned to the University of the West Indies (UWI), Mona as a lecturer in 1959, and was made Professor of Sociolinguistics in 1982. He returned to his homeland for a brief spell and lectured at the St Augustine campus of the UWI. He was a visiting professor at the University of Puerto Rico, Río Piedras.

Upon retirement from The University of the West Indies, Mona, the title of Professor emeritus was conferred on him. He was president of the Society for Caribbean Linguistics (SCL) from 1990 to 1992 and was made an honorary member of the SCL in 1998. He also became an honorary member of the Linguistic Society of America (LSA) in 1996. He is a co-founder of the journal Journal of Pidgin and Creole Languages. In 1996, a festschrift in his honour was published: Caribbean Language Issues, Old & New: Papers in Honour of Professor Mervyn Alleyne on the Occasion of His Sixtieth Birthday (edited by Pauline Christie, and published by UWI Press). In March 2007, Alleyne was the Humanities Scholar 2007 at The University of the West Indies, Cave Hill, Barbados. In October 2011, he was the guest of honour at the special panel discussion “The Interdisciplinary Scholarship of a Caribbeanist: A Tribute to Dr. Mervyn Alleyne,” an activity organized at the Institute of Caribbean Studies at the University of Puerto Rico at Río Piedras.

== Significance of his work ==
Alleyne was best known as a pioneer in Creole Studies. He was one of the few Caribbean-born participants in the second ever International Conference on Creole Languages held at The University of the West Indies, Mona in April 1968, the proceedings of which were published in 1971 in Pidginization and Creolization of Languages edited by Dell Hymes. His paper “Acculturation and the Culture Matrix of Creolization” elaborated some of the themes which were to characterize his later work. Alleyne disagrees with the idea that creoles necessarily develop from prior pidgins, and he explains the considerable variation among creoles as the result of differing degrees of acculturation among Africans who came in contact with Europeans.

Alleyne repudiated the use of the term 'creole', positing that its meaning is unclear. He carefully avoided it in his book Comparative Afro-American (1980), arguably the most quoted source on the relevant varieties. In addition to its detailed comparison of structural aspects of Sranan, Saramaccan, Jamaican Creole, Guyanese Creole, among others, this work reveals his preoccupation with the Black experience as a whole, and with the autonomy of Black culture. His fascination with the correlations between the linguistic picture and other aspects of culture, such as religion, manifests itself in Roots of Jamaican Culture (1988).

== Publications ==
- Acculturation and the cultural matrix of creolization. In Pidginization and Creolization of Languages (edited by Dell Hymes), 169–86. Cambridge (1971): Cambridge University Press.
- Comparative Afro-American — An Historical-Comparative Study of English-Based Afro-American Dialects, Ann Arbor (1980): Karoma.
- Theoretical Issues in Caribbean Linguistics (editor), Kingston (1982): University of the West Indies, Mona.
- Studies in Saramaccan Language Structures (editor), Amsterdam (1987): University of Amsterdam.
- Roots of Jamaican Culture, London (1988): Pluto Press.
- Syntaxe Historique Créole, Paris (1996): Karthala/Presses Universitaires Créoles.
- The Construction and Representation of Race and Ethnicity in the Caribbean and the World, Kingston (2002): UWI Press.
- Folk Medicine of Jamaica (with Arvilla Payne-Jackson), Kingston (2004): UWI Press.
