= Ethel Ray Nance =

American civil rights activist

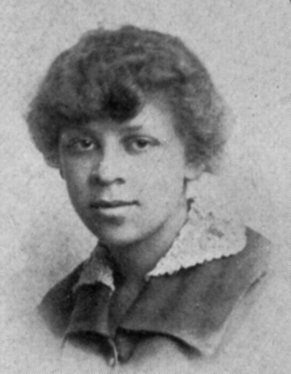
- Ethel Ray from Duluth Central High School's yearbook, the Zenith
- Born: Ethel Ray; April 13, 1899; Duluth, Minnesota
- Died: July 11, 1992 (aged 93); San Francisco, California
- Education: Central High School in Duluth (1917); University of San Francisco (1978)
- Occupation: Activist
- Employer(s): Minnesota Forest Fires Relief Commission; Opportunity Magazine; Phyllis Wheatley House; Minneapolis Police Department; NAACP; San Francisco Board of Education
- Organization: Minnesota Negro Council
- Spouse(s): LeRoy A. H. Williams (married 1929–43); Clarence A. Nance (married 1944–)
- Children: 2
- Parent(s): Inga Nordquist; William Henry Ray

Ethel Ray Nance was an African-American civil rights activist.

== Early life ==
Ethel Ray was born on April 13, 1899, in Duluth, Minnesota, to a Swedish mother and an African-American father. The Rays had four children: two sons and two daughters. Her father, William Henry Ray, was the president of the Duluth chapter of the National Association for the Advancement of Colored People (NAACP). He formed the Duluth branch in June 1920 after a white mob lynched three Black men four blocks from the Ray family home. Duluth had a small African-American population, leading to a lonely childhood for Nance.

She graduated from Central High School in 1917. In school, she trained to be a stenographer.

== Career ==
From 1919 to 1922, Nance worked as a stenographer for the Minnesota State Relief Commission, an organization that helped the victims of a series of 1918 fires in and around Duluth.

In 1921, at the age of 22, she met W. E. B. Du Bois when he spoke at an NAACP meeting in Duluth. This sparked a lifelong friendship between the two, and Nance would work for Du Bois later in her life.

Nance gained national recognition in 1923 for breaking the secretarial color barrier in the Minnesota State Legislature. In 1924, Nance became the executive secretary for the Kansas City Urban League. Here, she met Charles S. Johnson, who offered her a position with the League's publication, Opportunity. Nance moved to New York in 1924 and assisted Johnson with writing, researching, and editing for the magazine.

When her mother got sick, Nance returned to Minnesota, where she would become the associate head resident at the Phyllis Wheatley House from 1926 until 1928. From 1928 to 1931, Nance worked with the Women's Bureau at the Minneapolis Police Department. Nance was one of the first African-America policewomen in Minnesota.

In 1945, Nance moved to San Francisco with her family and became a secretary for her friend, Du Bois. While living on the west coast, she also worked for the regional office of the NAACP, the War Department, the U.S. District Court (as a deputy clerk), the Federal Public Housing Authority, and the San Francisco Board of Education. While working for the Board of Education, Nance researched Black history and became involved with the African-American Historical Society.

In 1978, Nance became the oldest person to earn a B.A. degree from the University of San Francisco at the time.

Throughout her life, Nance was also involved in several organizations, such as the Minnesota Negro Council and the San Francisco African-American Historical Society, and wrote for many publications. With the African-American Historical Society, Nance contributed to Negro History Week, which would later become Black History Month.

== Personal life ==
While in New York working for Opportunity, Nance lived in an apartment with Regina M. Anderson and Louella Tucker. Called the "Harlem West Side Literary Salon," the apartment was frequented by prominent figures of the Harlem Renaissance, including W. E. B. Du Bois and Zora Neale Hurston.

Ethel Ray married LeRoy A. H. Williams in 1929. They had two children, Thatcher and Glenn Ray, and separated in 1943.

She married Clarence A. Nance in 1944, and her two children took Nance's last name.

Nance died on July 11, 1992, in San Francisco, California.
