= Phyllis Wheatley Settlement House =

20th-century settlement house in Minneapolis, Minnesota

Phyllis Wheatley Settlement House, 1931

The Phyllis Wheatley Settlement House in Minneapolis, Minnesota, was founded in 1924 by the Council on Social Agencies (CSA) and the Women's Cooperative Alliance (WCA). Its original function was to provide a recreational facility that could be used by the Minneapolis African American community.

== Description ==
The settlement house was intended to serve the African American community during a time of Jim Crow segregation. Its first location, opened on October 17, 1924, was the repurposed Hebrew Talmud Torah School at Bassett Place which was purchased and renovated to serve the community. It quickly outgrew the facility and in 1929 the Phyllis Wheatley Settlement House moved to 809 Aldrich Avenue North. The relocation allowed the organization to expand it services to include education classes, a nursery school and kindergarten, an employment bureau, a library, transient quarters and dormitories and clinical services. The building was named after African-American poet Phyllis Wheatley.

Phyllis Wheatley Settlement House's first head resident was W. Gertrude Brown (1888–1939). Brown, a graduate of Columbia University, served as head resident from 1924 through 1937. Brown resigned her position, due to ongoing disagreements with the board of directors. The board of directors at that time was composed entirely of White people. Whites remained in a majority position on the board into the 1950s.

In the 1920s and early 1930s, during the Great Depression in the United States, the Phyllis Wheatley Settlement House served a variety of needs to the still-segregated Minneapolis African American community. Along with common settlement house activities, the Phyllis Wheatley Settlement House provided social services such as housing for University student and visitors to the city who otherwise could not find accommodations. Famous visitors included Marian Anderson, W. E. B. DuBois, Langston Hughes, and Paul Robeson, many of whom were connected with Ethel Ray Nance, the assistant head resident and one of the city's first Black female police officers. The Settlement House also provided social services that might otherwise been provided by local government such as "locating lost relatives, the provision of care for delinquent juveniles, locating foster care placements, counseling families, securing hospital treatment, and intervening in cases of discrimination".

Later in the 20th century, the advocacy role of settlement houses was waning and many community organizations merged for reasons of economy. The Phyllis Wheatley Settlement House resisted merging with the other settlement houses in the area.

The building on 809 Aldrich Avenue North was demolished due to the construction of Interstate 94. In 1972 a new building at 1301 10th Avenue North became the home of the Settlement House.

In 1962, the Wheatley House was renamed the Phyllis Wheatley Community Center and is still in operation at 1301 10th Avenue North in Minneapolis.
