= Camille Wardrop Alleyne =

Trinidadian aerospace engineer (born 1966)

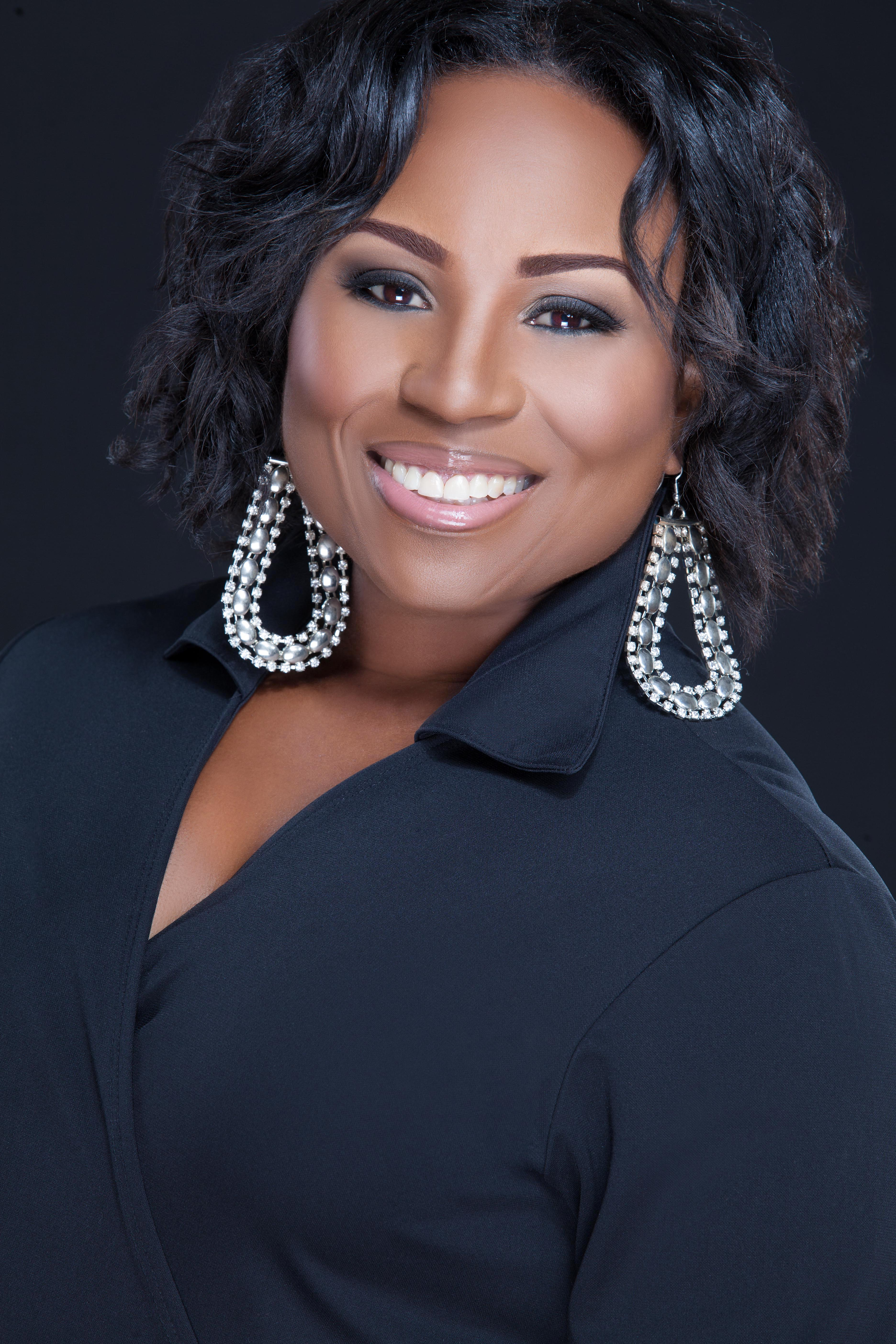
- Born: October 12, 1966 (age 59); Port-of-Spain, Trinidad
- Citizenship: American
- Education: Howard University; Florida A&M University; University of Maryland, College Park; University of Houston
- Known for: Space Exploration; STEM Education for Girls
- Children: Kiarra Alleyne
- Scientific career
- Fields: Aerospace engineer; Space scientist
- Institutions: NASA; Missile Defense Agency; U.S. Department of Defense

Camille Wardrop Alleyne (born Port-of-Spain, Trinidad, October 12, 1966) is an American aerospace engineer, space scientist, and science ambassador. She is the Founder, CEO and President of Arusha Space, LLC., a geospatial analytics and global space consulting company that uses space-enabled technologies for solving Earth's challenges. Prior to starting her company, Alleyne spent 29 years working for the US Government advancing space and aerospace technologies at NASA and Department of Defense.

== Education and early career ==
Alleyne was born and raised in Port of Spain, Trinidad and Tobago. She studied at Howard University in Washington, D.C. where she earned her Bachelor of Science in mechanical engineering with an aerospace option. Because her hopes of working for NASA were delayed after her she finished her undergraduate study, Alleyne decided to pursue a Masters from Florida A&M University in mechanical engineering with a specialization in composite materials.

Alleyne was one of two persons in her program recruited by NASA to work at the Kennedy Space Center as a flight systems engineer. She worked there for two years before she attended the University of Maryland to pursue another Masters in aerospace engineering with a specialization in hypersonic aerodynamics and propulsion. After graduating with her second Masters, she was recruited to work at the Naval Sea Systems Command on ship missile systems. She was then offered a position at the Missile Defense Agency under the U.S. Department of Defense to work on several ballistic missile defense projects as an aerospace systems engineer. These projects included the Ground-Based Midcourse Interceptor and Aegis Weapon System. Alleyne's work with the Department of Defense spanned eight years.

== NASA ==
Alleyne returned to NASA and worked on Constellation and Orion program as a lead system engineer and crew module systems engineer, and test manager, respectively. She worked with a team of engineers on the design and development of the Orion crew exploration vehicles responsible for transporting astronauts to destinations beyond Low Earth Orbit such as the moon, asteroids and, potentially, Mars.

Alleyne served as an associate program scientist for the International Space Station, based at NASA's Lyndon B. Johnson Space Centre in Houston, Texas. Her role as associate program scientist included communicating the ISS's scientific accomplishments with the general public, the leaders at NASA, the U.S. Congress, and scientific and educational communities. She also played a leading role in the international education programs across the ISS Partners. During her tenure, she pursued her Doctorate in Education in Educational Leadership from the University of Houston.

Alleyne then served as the Assistant Deputy Associate Administrator for Science Mission Directorate at NASA Headquarters. There she provided engineering and executive leadership, program and project management strategies, oversight of SMD flight project portfolio of over 100 earth, planetary, heliophysics and astrophysics missions, in addition to the joint program between NASA and National Oceanic and Atmospheric Administration that developed NOAA's weather satellites. In this role all while developing and implementing relevant policies and processes to execute those missions more effectively. She then served as the founding Deputy Manager for the Commercial Lunar Payload Services initiative at NASA Lyndon B. Johnson Space Centre in Houston, Texas. There she provided management of public-private partnership between NASA and commercial space companies and the execution of the delivery task orders for commercial transportation services to the lunar services. The first two of these awards were executed in January 2024 by space companies Astrobotics and Intuitive Machines, the latter of whom became the first commercial company to successfully land on the Moon. Alleyne then served as the Deputy Program Manager for the Commercial Low Earth Orbit Development Program at NASA Lyndon B. Johnson Space Centre. In this role, she was a leading architects for NASA's commercialization strategy for Low Earth Orbit sustainable space economy. She managed the Commercial LEO Destinations project - a public private partnership between NASA and commercial space companies to design and develop the next generation of commercially owned and operated space stations beyond International Space Station end of life. Alleyne also led strategy and policy development associated with enabling commercial activities on International Space Station, including Private Astronaut Missions. She then retired from NASA in January 2024.

Alleyne has earned several accolades for her work. Awards from NASA include several Silver Achievement Medals for her contribution and leadership to the NASA mission; a Commendation Award by NASA Johnson Space Center Director for her outstanding leadership and contribution to NASA’s mission; NASA Group Achievement Award for Commercial Lunar Payload Services Team in 2021; NASA Johnson Space Center Superior Achievement Awards; NASA Group Achievement Award for the ISS Benefits for Humanity Task Team in 2013; Certificate of Appreciation for the Transformation of the International Space Station to 6-person Crew Capabilities in 2009; the NASA Group Achievement Award for Constellation Requirements Development Team in 2007; and the NASA Group Achievement Award for Exploration Systems Architecture Study in 2006.

== Awards and honors ==
In 2024, Alleyne was honored by the L'Oreal Groupe as one of their "45 Women who Move the Caribbean" campaign. Alleyne has received numerous other awards and commendations from national and international organizations including being honored by the University of the West Indies with the Vice Chancellor's Award. She has also been awarded Outstanding Woman in Aerospace by the National Society of Black Engineers and Distinguished Alumni award from FAMU/FSU College of Engineering. In 2011, the National Institute for Higher Education, Research, Science and Technology (NIHERST) in Trinidad and Tobago named her as one of the Caribbean’s icons in Science and Technology. Alleyne is a part of the US Department of State Speakers Program which has taken her to numerous countries around the world as space and science public diplomat. She is also a member of the International Astronautical Federation (IAF) Workforce Development, Human Spaceflight and Space Education and Outreach Committees; Delta Sigma Theta sorority and The Ninety-Nines: International Organization of Women Pilots. In 2003, she was selected as one of 100 finalists for NASA's Astronaut Selection program.

== Philanthropy ==
In 2007, Alleyne founded The Brightest Stars Foundation, a 501(c)3 non-governmental organization that is dedicated to educating, empowering and inspiring young women to be future leaders through the study of science, math and technology. The organization provides mentorship to young women from all across the world, providing them with the tools needed to select careers in the science, technology, engineering and mathematics (STEM) and successfully matriculate through secondary and tertiary education in these fields.
