= John C. Dancy =

American journalist (1857–1920)

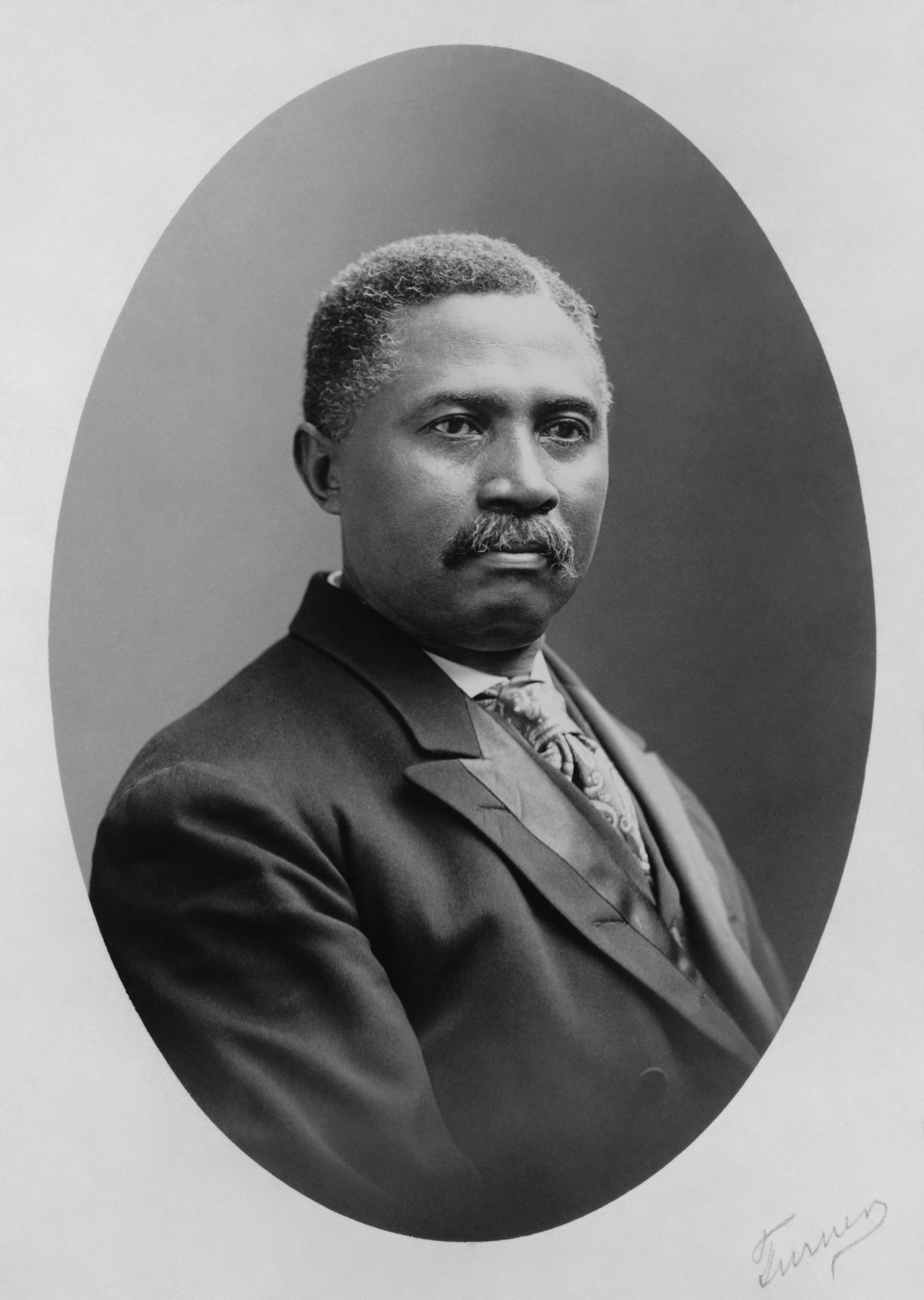
- Dancy in 1908
- Born: May 8, 1857; Tarboro, North Carolina, U.S.
- Died: December 5, 1920 (aged 63); Washington, D.C.
- Occupations: Politician, educator, journalist
- Political party: Republican
- Relatives: Franklin D. Dancy (brother)

Religious life
- Religion: African Methodist Episcopal Zion Church

John Campbell Dancy (May 8, 1857 – December 5, 1920) was an American politician, journalist, and educator in North Carolina and Washington, D.C. For many years he was the editor of African Methodist Episcopal (AME) Zion church newspapers Star of Zion and then Zion Quarterly. In 1897 he was appointed collector of customs at Wilmington, North Carolina, but was chased out of town in the Wilmington massacre of 1898, in part for his activity in the National Afro-American Council which he helped found that year and of which he was an officer. He then moved to Washington, D.C., where he served as Recorder of Deeds from 1901 to 1910. His political appointments came in part as a result of the influence of his ally, Booker T. Washington.

== Early life ==
John Campbell Dancy was born a slave in Tarboro, North Carolina, on May 8, 1857. His father was also named John Campbell Dancy, but he was not called junior, although his son would be. He began attending school after the American Civil War (1861–1865). In 1873 he began working as an office boy at the Tarboro Southerner, and within a few months was working as a typographer. However, he faced discrimination on account of his race and soon left the position to enroll in Howard University in Washington, D.C. He soon left the school to return home to take care of his family when his father died. Back in North Carolina he briefly taught school, but then was appointed to a position in the United States Treasury Department and returned to the capital, through the influence of John A. Hyman. Less than a year later he resigned to return to Tarbaro to become principal of a school there.

== Early career ==
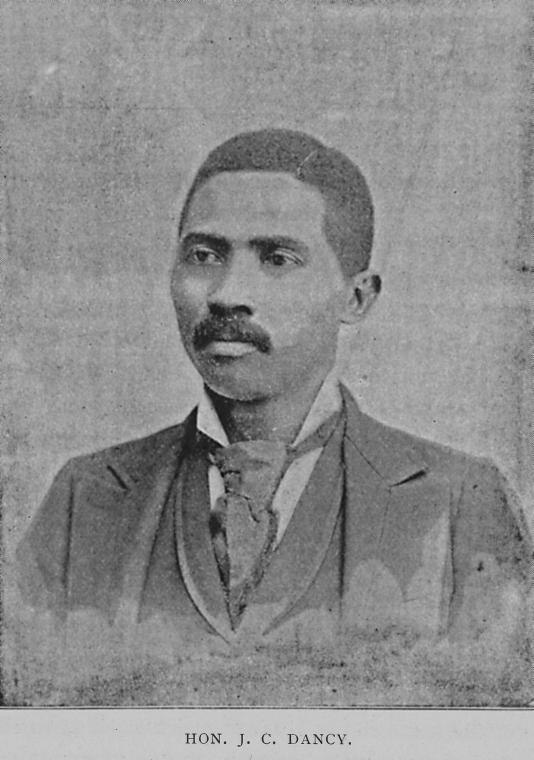
Dancy in 1895

In 1877 he was secretary of the state convention of colored men, a part of the Colored Conventions Movement, and was the chief secretary of the state Republican convention in 1880, 1884, 1886, 1888, and 1890. In 1880 and 1882 he was elected recorder of deeds of Edgecombe County, and was chairman of the county Republican Committee for many years. In 1884, he was a delegate to the Republican National Convention, where he supported John A. Logan. He was again a delegate at the 1888 Republican National Convention where he supported John Sherman and at the 1892 Republican National Convention. He was a prominent campaigner in all three elections.

== Journalism ==
He edited a newspaper, the North Carolina Sentinel for three years. He resigned that position at the request of AME Zion bishops to become editor and business manager of the church's paper, the Star of Zion in 1885. He resigned that position at the General Conference of the AME Zion church in 1892, to be succeeded by George W. Clinton. Instead, that year Dancy took the position as editor of the African Methodist Episcopal Zion Quarterly, which had been edited by Clinton. At the Quarterly Review he was closely associated with Booker T. Washington, who subsidized the paper.

== Later career ==
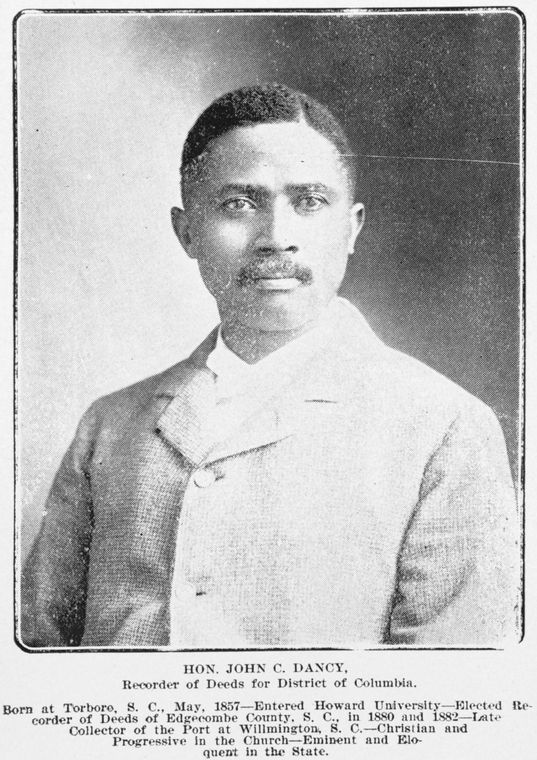
Dancy in 1902

With the support of Booker T. Washington, he was appointed collector of customs at Wilmington, North Carolina, in 1893 and 1897, serving the position under presidents Harrison and McKinley. From 1893 to 1897, under Democratic president Grover Cleveland, Dancy was replaced as customs director by William Rand Kenan Sr., a white Democrat and later a leader in the Wilmington massacre. Dancy would again take over as customs director when Republican William McKinley became president in 1897. That year, he was also involved in the founding of Coleman Manufacturing Company, the first cotton mill in the United States owned and operated by African Americans In 1898, Dancy was a part of the founding of the National Afro-American Council, formed after the collapse of the National Afro-American League. T. Thomas Fortune was initially elected president, but he declined the position and Alexander Walters was selected. Dancy was elected vice-president, Ida B. Wells secretary, and John W. Thompson treasurer. Washington was also a primary player in the group. Tensions rose in Wilmington during this period, and Dancy's position on an organization in opposition to legislation which prevented interracial marriages increased the tension. Tension came to a head in November with the Wilmington massacre of 1898, during which thousands of the city's African Americans were attacked, and Dancy was forced to flee the city. Although Democratic newspapers had loudly complained about a black man being the port collector, Dancy is not known to have actually been on the Democrat's banishment list, likely due to concern that exiling a federal official would encourage president McKinley to stop the insurrection. Dancy's family nevertheless fled the violence and joined Dancy in Tarboro, where he had been at the time of the riot. Dancy became controversial among black people in the days following the insurrection due to urging black people to be "quiet, orderly (and) submissive to authority." Dancy was one of the few black officials who was allowed to return to his post after the riot, and he returned to Wilmington and served as the city's port collector until 1901. Dancy then moved to Washington DC and was appointed to the position of recorder of deeds from 1901 to 1910. His home in Washington became a center of Southern black society in the nation's capital.

== Other activities ==
Dancy was a prominent layman in the A. M. E. Zion church and was a lay delegate to the general conferences of the church in 1880 and 1884. He was also a prominent freemason. He was a trustee of Livingstone College and served as chairman of the Executive Committee of the National Afro-American Press Association.

== Personal life and death ==
His first wife was Laura G. Coleman of Morganton, North Carolina. They had five children, two boys and three girls, two of whom died in infancy. Laura died in December 1890. In March 1893 he married Florence Virginia Stevenson, from Allegheny City, Pennsylvania. Dancy's son, John C. Dancy Jr. was executive director of the Detroit Urban League. His surviving daughter was Lillian G. Reed, and his other son was Dr. Joseph Price Dancy.

Dancy died on the morning of December 5, 1920, at his home on 2139 L Street NW in Washington, D.C. His funeral was on December 7, 1920, at Galbraith A. M. E. Zion church. The eulogy was read by his friend, Rev. William Harvey Goler and led by Bishop J. S. Caldwell. Honorary pallbearers were Robert Heberton Terrell, John E. Traylor, Whitefield McKinlay, S. M. Pierre, E. D. Williston, P. B. S. Pinchback, J. Finley Wilson, Simon Green Atkins, Emmett Jay Scott, D. C. Suggs, Thomas E. Jones, and Nathan Williams. He was survived by two sisters, Ella and Martha.

In 1889, Dancy's niece, Cottie S. Dancy, married Aaron McDuffie Moore, the first Black medical doctor of Durham, North Carolina.
