= Cameron Chesterfield Alleyne =

American bishop (1880–1955)

Cameron Chesterfield Alleyne BA
- Bishop
- Church: African Methodist Episcopal Zion Church
- Diocese: Sixth episcopal district
- In office: 1936–1955
- Other posts: AMEZ representative to the Commission of Army and Navy Chaplains
- Previous posts: Twelfth episcopal district and resident bishop in Africa (1924–1928); Seventh episcopal district (1928–1936)

Orders
- Ordination: October 5, 1904
- Consecration: May 20, 1924

Personal details
- Born: September 3, 1880 Bridgetown, Barbados
- Died: March 24, 1955 (aged 74) Philadelphia, United States
- Parents: Robert Henry Alleyene and Amelia Anna Alleyne
- Spouse: Lucille Annie Washington (1905–1944); Bettye Lee Roberts (1946–1955)
- Children: One
- Education: Naparima College, Trinidad; Tuskegee Institute, Alabama, United States

Cameron Chesterfield Alleyne (September 3, 1880 – March 24, 1955) was a Barbados-born American bishop of the African Methodist Episcopal Zion Church (AMEZ). Alleyne studied in the United States and was ordained there. He held appointments as a pastor in churches across the United States, served as a trustee of several educational institutions and edited AMEZ's journal. Alleyne was elected a bishop of the church in 1924, becoming the first AMEZ bishop to be elected by unanimous vote. His first posting was as resident bishop to Africa, during which he made attempts to reform the church's missions and expand its reach. Returning to the US in 1928 he held appointments to two AMEZ districts and as a representative to the Commission of Army and Navy Chaplains during World War II.

== Education ==
Cameron Chesterfield Alleyne was born on September 3, 1880, in Bridgetown, Barbados, to Robert Henry Alleyene and Amelia Anna Alleyne. He attended Naparima College on Trinidad between 1899 and 1903 before travelling to the United States to attend the Tuskegee Institute, a black university in Alabama. Alleyne was awarded a Bachelor of Arts degree by the Institute and was ordained as a deacon in the African Methodist Episcopal Zion Church (AMEZ) on October 5, 1904.

== Pastor ==
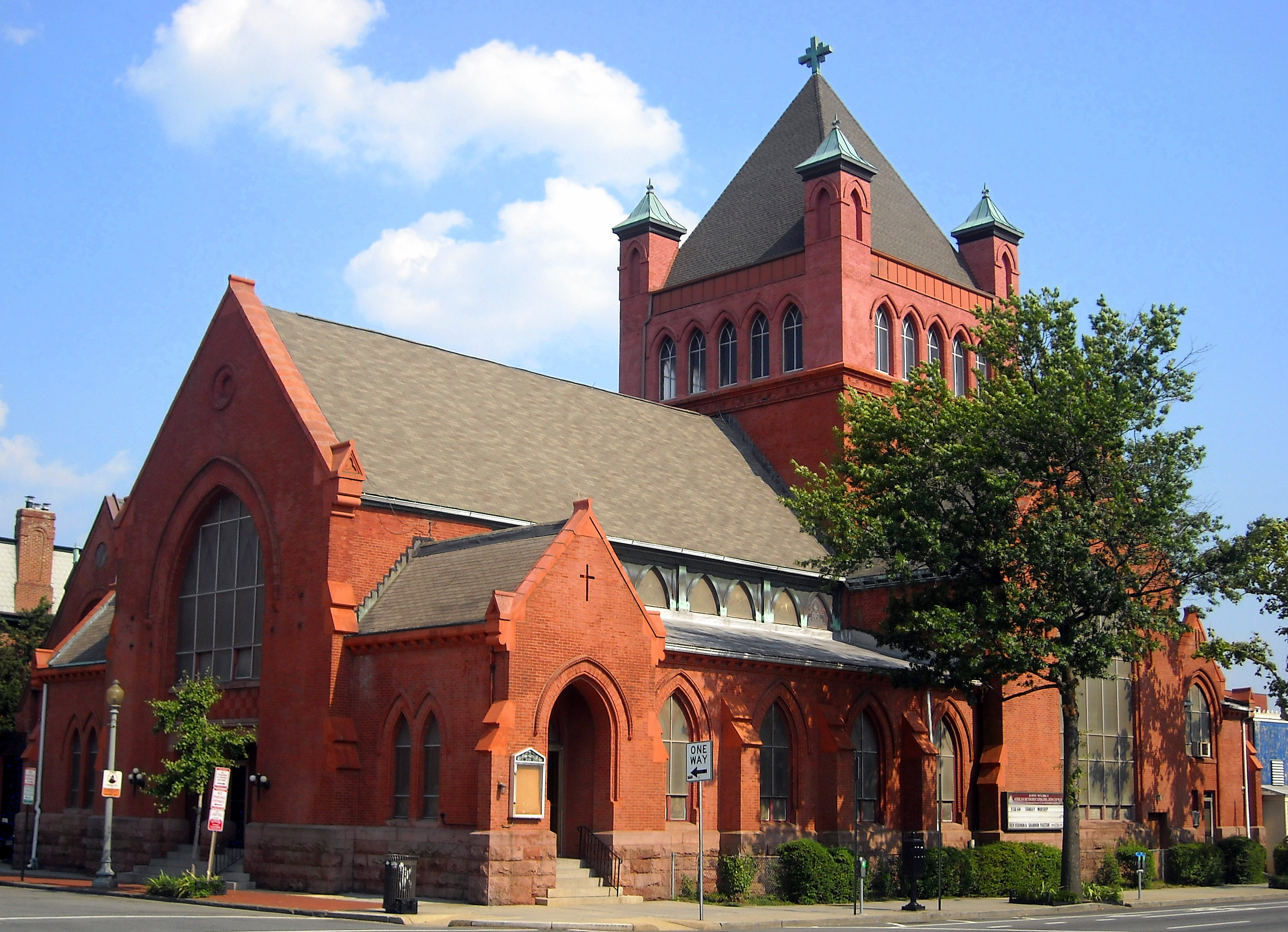
John Wesley Church, Washington DC

Alleyne was posted as pastor to Anniston, Alabama, and there married Lucille Annie Washington on June 29, 1905 (they had one child together). Alleyne was ordained as an elder of the church on December 12, 1905. He served at a church in St. Elmo, Chattanooga, Tennessee, between 1905 and 1908 and at the John Wesley Church in Washington, D.C., from 1907 to 1912. Alleyne was in Rhode Island from 1912 to 1916 at the People's Church (later renamed the Hood Memorial Church); in Charlotte, North Carolina, at Grace Church from 1916 to 1917 and in New Rochelle, New York, from 1917 to 1924. In 1915 he was awarded an honorary Master of Arts degree by Livingstone College, North Carolina, and in 1924 an honorary doctor of divinity degree by Howard University, Washington, D.C., in 1924. Alleyne was interested in education and became a trustee of Livingstone College and also Shorter College in Little Rock, Alabama, and Payne Theological Seminary in Wilberforce, Ohio. Between 1916 and 1924 Alleyne also worked as editor of the AMEZ's journal, the Quarterly Review.

== Bishop ==
Alleyne was one of five bishops elected at the AMEZ General Convention in 1924, the largest single group elected in the church's history. He was the AMEZ's 44th bishop and the first ever elected by a unanimous vote. Alleyne was consecrated as a bishop on May 20, 1924, and appointed to the church's twelfth episcopal district. In this role he had responsibility for churches in Liberia, Nigeria, Ghana and elsewhere in Africa. Alleyne moved to the continent to become AMEZ's first ever resident bishop in Africa. In this role Alleyene implemented reform of the church's mission stations, which had been in decline for some time. For this, and later work, he became known as the leading expansionist of his generation in the church. In 1931 he published a book, Gold Coast at a Glance, about his time in Africa.

Alleyne returned to the United States in 1928 and served initially with AMEZ's seventh episcopal district. He transferred to the sixth episcopal district in 1936, assuming responsibility for churches in South America and the US Virgin Islands as well as some in the United States. During this time he lived in Philadelphia. After the United States joined World War II Alleyne was chosen as the AMEZ representative to the Commission of Army and Navy Chaplains. Alleyne's wife Lucille died in May 1944 and he subsequently married Bettye Lee Roberts in June 1946. He published his autobiography Twenty-Five Years in the Episcopacy in 1950 and died on March 24, 1955, in Philadelphia.
