= Kerry Alleyne =

Dominican footballer

Personal information
- Date of birth: 15 December 1983 (age 42)
- Position: Forward

Senior career*
Years	Team	Apps	(Gls)
- Harlem United FC

International career
2004–2010	Dominica	7	(0)
- * Club domestic league appearances and goals

Kerry Alleyne (born 15 December 1983) is a Dominican former international footballer who played as a midfielder.

== Career ==
He made his international debut for Dominica in 2004, and appeared in FIFA World Cup qualifying matches.
