= Dublin Walker =

American politician

Dublin Walker (often noted as Dublin I. Walker or Dublin J. Walker) was an African-American State Senator in South Carolina. A Republican, he represented Chester County, South Carolina from 1874 to 1877 and also served as the county's school commissioner.

Walker was arrested on April 23, 1877, charged with grand larceny and jailed by the resurgent Democratic Party known as the (Redeemers). He was therefore unable to take his seat in the Senate and resigned three days later on the 26th.

In November 1875 Governor Daniel Henry Chamberlain (R) pardoned Walker who had been convicted of conspiracy to cheat and defraud.

== See also ==
- African American officeholders from the end of the Civil War until before 1900
- Annie Walker Blackwell
