= Charles McMillen (architect) =

American architect

Charles M. McMillen (1854–1911) was an Irish born architect notable for his work in Duluth, Minnesota and Wilmington, North Carolina. He often designed buildings in Richardsonian Romanesque and other styles.

== Architectural career ==
Charles McMillen partnered with Edwin S. Radcliffe in Duluth from 1889 to 1893.

McMillen won a competition in 1898 to design the Masonic Temple in Wilmington, North Carolina, and moved there. It was reported in the Wilmington Messenger newspaper that he had by then designed 14 Masonic Temple buildings. He designed in North Carolina for about 10 years.

Works include:

- Old Masonic Temple, Duluth, Minnesota
- Messenger and Southern Bell Telephone and Telegraph Building (1899), Wilmington, North Carolina
- Murchison National Bank (1902), Wilmington
- Southern Building (1905), Wilmington
- I.M. Bear Building (1906), Wilmington
- Carolina Yacht Club, near Wilmington
- Wright-Harriss Bellamy House, renovation from Italianate to Queen Anne style
- Bridgers House 1905)
- Masonic Temple, Wilmington, North Carolina
- Grand Lodge Masonic Temple, Raleigh, North Carolina
