= African Methodist Episcopal Zion Church =

Predominantly African-American Christian denomination

- Classification: Protestant
- Orientation: Mainline Methodist
- Theology: Wesleyan-Arminian
- Polity: Connexionalism
- Headquarters: Charlotte, North Carolina
- Origin: 1821; 205 years ago New York, New York
- Separated from: Methodist Episcopal Church
- Members: 1.4 million+
- Official website: amezion.org

The African Methodist Episcopal Zion Church, or the AME Zion Church (AMEZ) is a historically African-American Christian denomination based in the United States. It was officially formed in 1821 in New York City but operated for several years before then. The African Methodist Episcopal Zion Church adheres to Wesleyan-Arminian theology.

The AME Zion Church is not to be confused with the similarly named African Methodist Episcopal Church (AME), which was officially formed in 1816 by Richard Allen and Daniel Coker in Philadelphia. The denomination was made up of AME churches in the Philadelphia region, including Delaware and New Jersey. Though the African Methodist Episcopal Zion Church was founded to grant equal rights to African Americans in Methodist Christianity, its church membership is composed of people of all racial backgrounds.

== History ==
The origins of this church can be traced to the John Street Methodist Church of New York City. Following acts of overt discrimination in New York (such as black parishioners being forced to leave worship), many black Christians left to form their own churches. The first church founded by the AME Zion Church was built in 1800 and was named Zion; one of the founders was William Hamilton, a prominent orator and abolitionist. These early black churches still belonged to the Methodist Episcopal Church denomination, although the congregations were independent. During the Great Awakening, the Methodists and Baptists had welcomed free blacks and slaves to their congregations and as preachers.

The fledgling Zion church grew, and multiple churches developed from the original congregation. These churches were attended by black congregants but ministered to by white ordained Methodist ministers. In 1820, six of these churches met to ordain James Varick as an elder, and in 1821 he was made the first General Superintendent of the AME Zion Church. A debate raged within the white-dominated Methodist church over accepting black ministers. This debate ended on July 30, 1822, when Varick was ordained as the first bishop of the AME Zion church, a newly independent denomination. The total membership in 1866 was about 42,000. Two years later, it claimed 164,000 members, as it sent missionaries to the South after the American Civil War to plant new churches with the newly emancipated freedmen. The AME Zion Church had been part of the abolitionist movement and became known as the "Freedom Church", because it was associated with the period after emancipation of the slaves.

Black churches were integral in helping build communities and develop leadership among the freedmen in the South. Later they played an increasingly powerful role in the civil rights movement of the mid-20th century. The AME Zion Church remained smaller than the African Methodist Episcopal (AME) Church, a denomination started in Philadelphia in the early 19th century, because some of its ministers lacked the authority to perform marriages, and many of its ministers avoided political roles. Its finances were weak, and in general its leadership was not as strong as that of the AME Church. However, it was the leader among all Protestant denominations in ordaining women and giving them powerful roles in the church.

An influential leader bishop was James Walker Hood (1831–1918) of North Carolina. He not only created and fostered his network of AME Zion churches in North Carolina, but he also was the grand master for the entire South of the Prince Hall Freemasonry, a secular black fraternal organization that strengthened the political and economic forces inside the black community. Hood Theological Seminary in Salisbury, North Carolina, is named in Hood's honor.

The Methodist Holiness movement came to the AME Zion Church, with Julia A. J. Foote among others preaching the doctrine of entire sanctification throughout pulpits of the connexion. Foote was the first woman ordained as a deacon within the connexion in 1894 and "in 1899, was ordained—the second female elder in her denomination."

In 1924 Cameron Chesterfield Alleyne became the church's first resident bishop in Africa.

== Organization ==
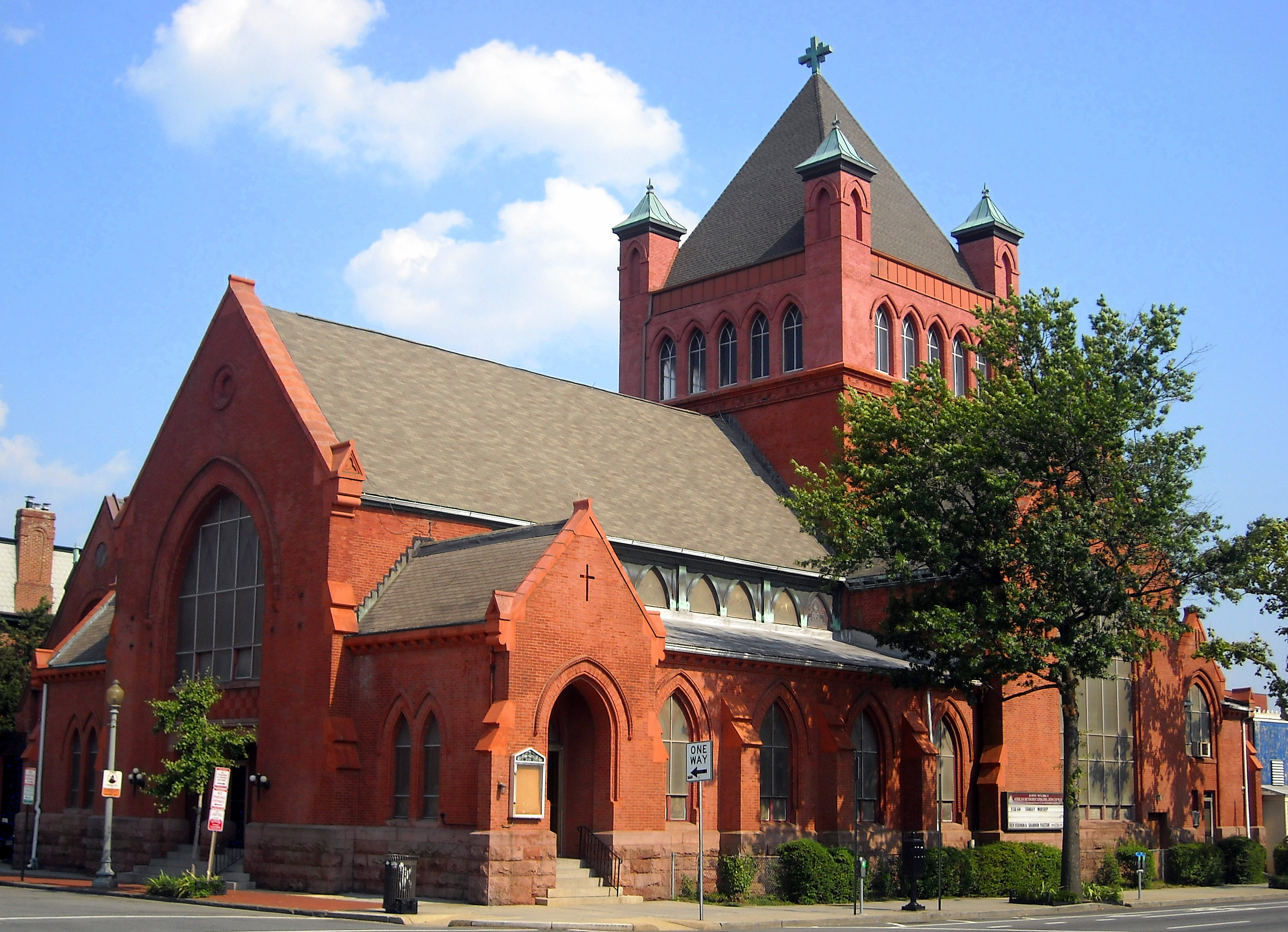
John Wesley AME Zion Church (est. 1847), located in the Logan Circle neighborhood of Washington, D.C.

A general conference is the supreme administrative body of the church. Between meetings of the conference, the church is administered by the AMEZ Board of Bishops. The Book of Discipline is the instrument for setting forth the laws, plan, polity, and process by which the AME Zion Church governs itself.

The denomination operates Livingstone College in Salisbury, North Carolina, and two junior colleges. In 1906 the religious studies department of Livingstone College was renamed Hood Theological Seminary, in honor of the influential bishop. Hood remained a department of the college until 2001. On July 1, 2001, the seminary began operating independently of the college, and in March 2002, the Southern Association of Colleges and Schools, the college's accrediting agency acknowledged that the seminary was a separate institution, sponsored by the AME Zion Church independently of the college.

The AME Zion missionaries are active in North and South America, Africa, and the Caribbean region. In 1998, the AME Zion Church commissioned the Reverend Dwight B. and BeLinda P. Cannon as the first family missionaries to South Africa in recent memory. These modern-day missionaries served from 1997 through 2004. Dr. Cannon was Administrative Assistant to the late Bishop Richard K. Thompson, who oversaw the work of South Africa, Zimbabwe, and Swaziland. The AME Zion Church has performed mission work in the countries of Nigeria, Liberia, Malawi, Mozambique, Angola, Côte d'Ivoire, and Ghana in Africa; England, India, and Jamaica, St. Croix-Virgin Islands, Trinidad, and Tobago in the Caribbean; and others.

== Ecumenism ==
In May 2012, the African Methodist Episcopal Zion Church entered into full communion with the United Methodist Church, African Methodist Episcopal Church, African Union Methodist Protestant Church, Christian Methodist Episcopal Church, and Union American Methodist Episcopal Church, in which these churches agreed to "recognize each other's churches, share sacraments, and affirm their clergy and ministries."

The AME Zion Church has been in negotiations for many years to merge with the Christian Methodist Episcopal Church (CME) into a tentatively named Christian Methodist Episcopal Zion Church with more than 2 million members. The plan was originally for unification by 2004. The AME Zion church is very similar in doctrine and practice to the CME Church and the AME Church.

== Notable clergy and members ==
- Bishop John Wesley Alstork
- Bishop George Lincoln Blackwell
- Marie L. Clinton
- John C. Dancy
- Eliza Ann Gardner
- Bishop Mildred "Bonnie" Hines
- Bishop James Walker Hood
- Bishop Singleton T. Jones
- Henry Moxley
- Bishop Stephen Gill Spottswood
- Harriet Tubman
- Bishop Alexander Walters
- Congresswoman-elect & deacon Lakesha Womack

== See also ==
- Christianity in the United States
- Churches Uniting in Christ
- Methodist Episcopal Church, South
- Methodist Episcopal Church
- Religion of Black Americans
