= National Register of Historic Places listings in Cabarrus County, North Carolina =

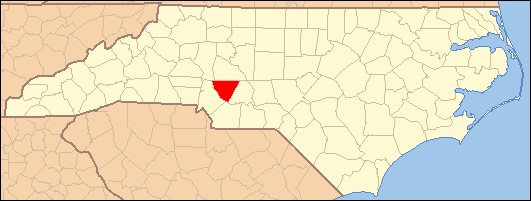

This list includes properties and districts listed on the National Register of Historic Places in Cabarrus County, North Carolina. Click the "Map of all coordinates" link to the right to view an online map of all properties and districts with latitude and longitude coordinates in the table below.

== Current listings ==
This National Park Service list is complete through NPS recent listings posted May 1, 2026.

	Name on the Register	Image	Date listed	Location	City or town	Description
1	Barber-Scotia College	Barber-Scotia College	February 28, 1985 (#85000378)	145 Cabarrus Ave. West; 35°24′23″N 80°35′09″W	Concord	
2	Bethel Church Arbor	Bethel Church Arbor	May 23, 1997 (#97000472)	Jct of SR 1123 and SR 1121; 35°14′27″N 80°32′12″W	Midland	Bethel Church Arbor is a historic religious shelter for Methodist camp meetings located at Midland, North Carolina. It was built about 1878 and is an open rectangular structure topped by a metal-clad hipped roof.
3	Boger-Hartsell Farm		July 23, 1998 (#98000890)	Jct. of US 601 and SR 1148; 35°18′53″N 80°31′00″W	Concord	
4	Bost Mill Historic District		January 13, 1986 (#86000076)	N and S sides of NC 200 off US 601; 35°19′32″N 80°30′08″W	Georgeville	Bost Mill Historic District is a national historic district located near Georgeville, North Carolina. The district has 10 buildings and 3 sites associated with the Bost Mill grain and cotton operation.
5	Cabarrus County Courthouse	Cabarrus County Courthouse	June 5, 1974 (#74001328)	Union St., S. 35°24′37″N 80°34′52″W	Concord	
6	Coleman-Franklin-Cannon Mill	Coleman-Franklin-Cannon Mill	April 16, 2015 (#15000161)	625 Main St., SW. 35°23′14″N 80°35′24″W	Concord	
7	Dr. Charles Favoni-Harris and William Shakespeare House		March 5, 1986 (#86000413)	SR 1445; 35°23′24″N 80°43′13″W	Poplar Tent	
8	First Congregational Church	First Congregational Church	January 9, 1986 (#86000030)	Corner of Wade and C Sts. 35°23′57″N 80°25′40″W	Mount Pleasant	
9	Gem Theatre	Gem Theatre	August 26, 2019 (#100004322)	111 West 1st Street; 35°29′54″N 80°37′29″W	Kannapolis	
10	John Bunyan Green Farm		June 2, 1988 (#88000651)	SR 1114 .5 miles E of SR 1178; 35°12′56″N 80°29′23″W	Midland	
11	Daniel Isenhour House and Farm		April 21, 2000 (#00000392)	11970 Mt. Olive Rd. 35°29′51″N 80°22′50″W	Gold Hill	
12	Lentz Hotel	Lentz Hotel	June 14, 1982 (#82003438)	College St. 35°24′10″N 80°26′14″W	Mount Pleasant	The Lentz Hotel in Mount Pleasant, North Carolina, is an historic site built in 1853 that is the oldest commercial building in Cabarrus County, North Carolina.
13	Logan Neighborhood Historic District		December 29, 2025 (#100012454)	Roughly bounded by Cabarrus Avenue W, Spring Street SW, Broad Drive SW, Fox Street SW, Fairview Avenue SW, Georgia Street SW. Melrose Drive SW, Hilltop Avenue SW, and Crowell Drive SW; 35°23′55″N 80°34′54″W	Concord	
14	McCurdy Log House		January 21, 1974 (#74001329)	S of Concord off U.S. 601; 35°19′03″N 80°32′32″W	Concord	
15	Meek House		September 24, 2001 (#01001026)	NC 1624, 0.3 miles NE of jct. with SR 1622; 35°15′18″N 80°36′05″W	Concord	
16	Mill Hill		September 10, 1974 (#74001330)	W of Kannapolis on SR 1616; 35°28′36″N 80°41′59″W	Concord	
17	Robert Harvey Morrison Farm and Pioneer Mills Gold Mine	Robert Harvey Morrison Farm and Pioneer Mills Gold Mine	December 31, 1990 (#90001952)	730 Morrison Rd. 35°15′43″N 80°35′13″W	Midland	
18	Mount Pleasant Collegiate Institute Historic District	Mount Pleasant Collegiate Institute Historic District	November 15, 1979 (#79001686)	Jct. of NC 49 and NC 73; 35°24′08″N 80°26′12″W	Mount Pleasant	
19	Mount Pleasant Historic District	Mount Pleasant Historic District	May 12, 1986 (#86001050)	Roughly W. and E. Franklin between N. Halifax and C and N and N. and S. Main Sts. between Boston and Broad Sts. 35°24′03″N 80°26′06″W	Mount Pleasant	
20	Norcott Mill-Cannon Mills Company Plant No. 10		December 8, 2021 (#100007248)	580, 594, 598 Cabarrus Ave. West; 569-581 Flora Ave. NW; 35°23′53″N 80°36′04″W	Concord	
21	North Union Street Historic District	North Union Street Historic District	April 15, 1986 (#86000789)	Roughly bounded by Peachtree Ave. NW, Church St. N, Cobran Ave. SW, and Georgia St. NW and Spring St. N 35°24′46″N 80°35′13″W	Concord	
22	Odell-Locke-Randolph Cotton Mill	Odell-Locke-Randolph Cotton Mill	March 28, 1983 (#83001838)	Buffalo, Church, Peachtree, and Locust Sts. 35°25′06″N 80°35′26″W	Concord	
23	Harvey Jeremiah Peeler House	Harvey Jeremiah Peeler House	August 16, 2007 (#07000818)	101 S. Ridge Ave. 35°29′50″N 80°37′24″W	Kannapolis	
24	Rev. John E. Pressley House		January 6, 1986 (#86000029)	N side of SR 1613 0.3 miles E of SR 1612; 35°30′18″N 80°45′40″W	Bethpage	
25	Reed Gold Mine	Reed Gold Mine	October 15, 1966 (#66000587)	11 miles SE of Concord; 35°16′52″N 80°27′36″W	Concord	The Reed Gold Mine is located in Midland, North Carolina, and is the site of the first documented commercial gold find in the United States.
26	Rocky River Presbyterian Church	Rocky River Presbyterian Church	March 6, 1986 (#86000419)	Jct. of SR 1139 and SR 1158; 35°18′09″N 80°35′58″W	Rocky River	
27	South Union Street Courthouse and Commercial Historic District	South Union Street Courthouse and Commercial Historic District	September 30, 1997 (#97001196)	Along Union St., bounded by Corban and Cabarrus Aves. 35°24′34″N 80°34′49″W	Concord	
28	South Union Street Historic District	South Union Street Historic District	April 10, 1986 (#86000736)	Roughly bounded by Corban Ave. SW, S. Union St., Blume Ave. SE, and Spring St. SW; 35°24′13″N 80°34′30″W	Concord	
29	Spears House	Spears House	August 7, 1989 (#89001046)	1615 Morrison Rd. 35°15′14″N 80°36′10″W	Concord	
30	Stonewall Jackson Training School Historic District	Stonewall Jackson Training School Historic District	March 15, 1984 (#84001966)	SR 1157; 35°21′51″N 80°35′54″W	Concord	
31	Union Street North-Cabarrus Avenue Commercial Historic District		December 10, 2003 (#03001272)	Roughly Union St. N, Cabarrus Ave. E, Cabarrus Ave. W, and Church St. S 35°24′38″N 80°34′53″W	Concord	

== See also ==
- National Register of Historic Places listings in North Carolina
- List of National Historic Landmarks in North Carolina
