= Concord, North Carolina =

- City
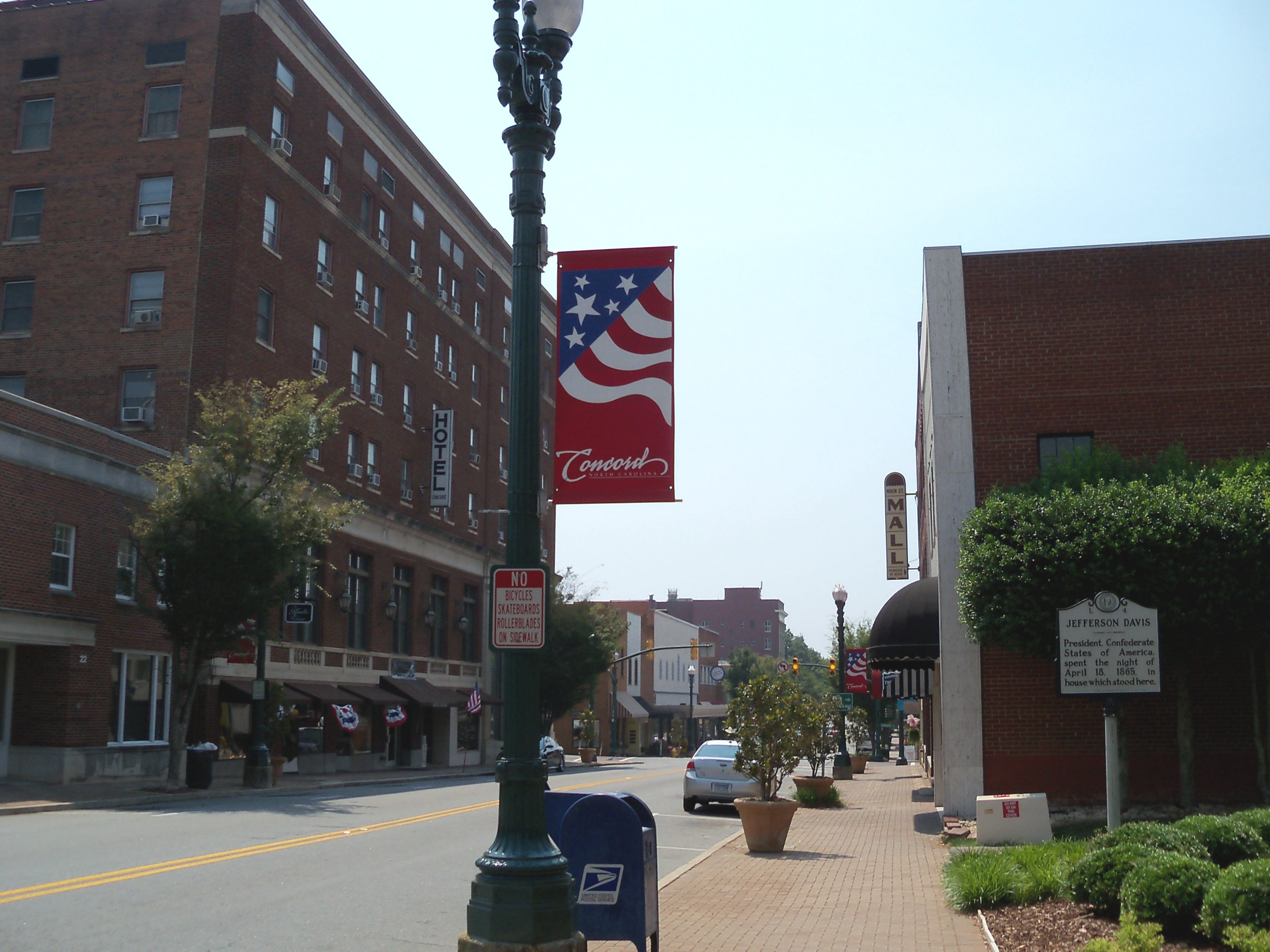
- Downtown Concord

- Seal Logo
- Motto: "High Performance Living"
- Interactive map of Concord, North Carolina
- Location within North Carolina Location within the United States
- Coordinates: 35°24′37″N 80°35′07″W
- Country: United States
- State: North Carolina
- County: Cabarrus
- Founded: April 1796
- Incorporated: 1806
- Named for: Harmony

Government
  - Type: Council–manager
  - Mayor: Stephen M. Morris

Area
  - Total: 64.04 sq mi (165.86 km^{2})
  - Land: 64.00 sq mi (165.77 km^{2})
  - Water: 0.035 sq mi (0.09 km^{2}) 0.06%
- Elevation: 633 ft (193 m)

Population (2020)
  - Total: 105,240
  - Estimate (2023): 110,119
  - Rank: 303rd in the United States; 10th in North Carolina
  - Density: 1,644.3/sq mi (634.87/km^{2})
  - Urban: 278,612 (US: 145th)
  - Urban density: 1,393/sq mi (537.7/km^{2})
  - Metro: 2,805,115 (US: 22nd)
- Time zone: UTC−5 (EST)
  - Summer (DST): UTC−4 (EDT)
- ZIP code: 28025, 28026, 28027
- Area codes: 704, 980
- FIPS code: 37-14100
- GNIS feature ID: 2404117
- Primary Airport: Concord-Padgett Regional Airport
- Secondary Airport: Charlotte Douglas International Airport
- Public transportation: CKRider
- Website: www.concordnc.gov

Concord (/ˌkɒnˈkɔːrd/ kon-KORD) is the most populous city in Cabarrus County, North Carolina, United States, and its county seat. The city had a population of 105,240 at the 2020 census. Concord is the second-most populous city in the Charlotte metropolitan area, tenth-most populous city in North Carolina and 287th-most populous city in the U.S.

The city was a winner of the All-America City Award in 2004. Located near the center of Cabarrus County in the Piedmont region, it is 20 miles (32 km) northeast of Uptown Charlotte. Concord is the home to some of North Carolina's top tourist destinations, including NASCAR's Charlotte Motor Speedway and Concord Mills.

== History ==
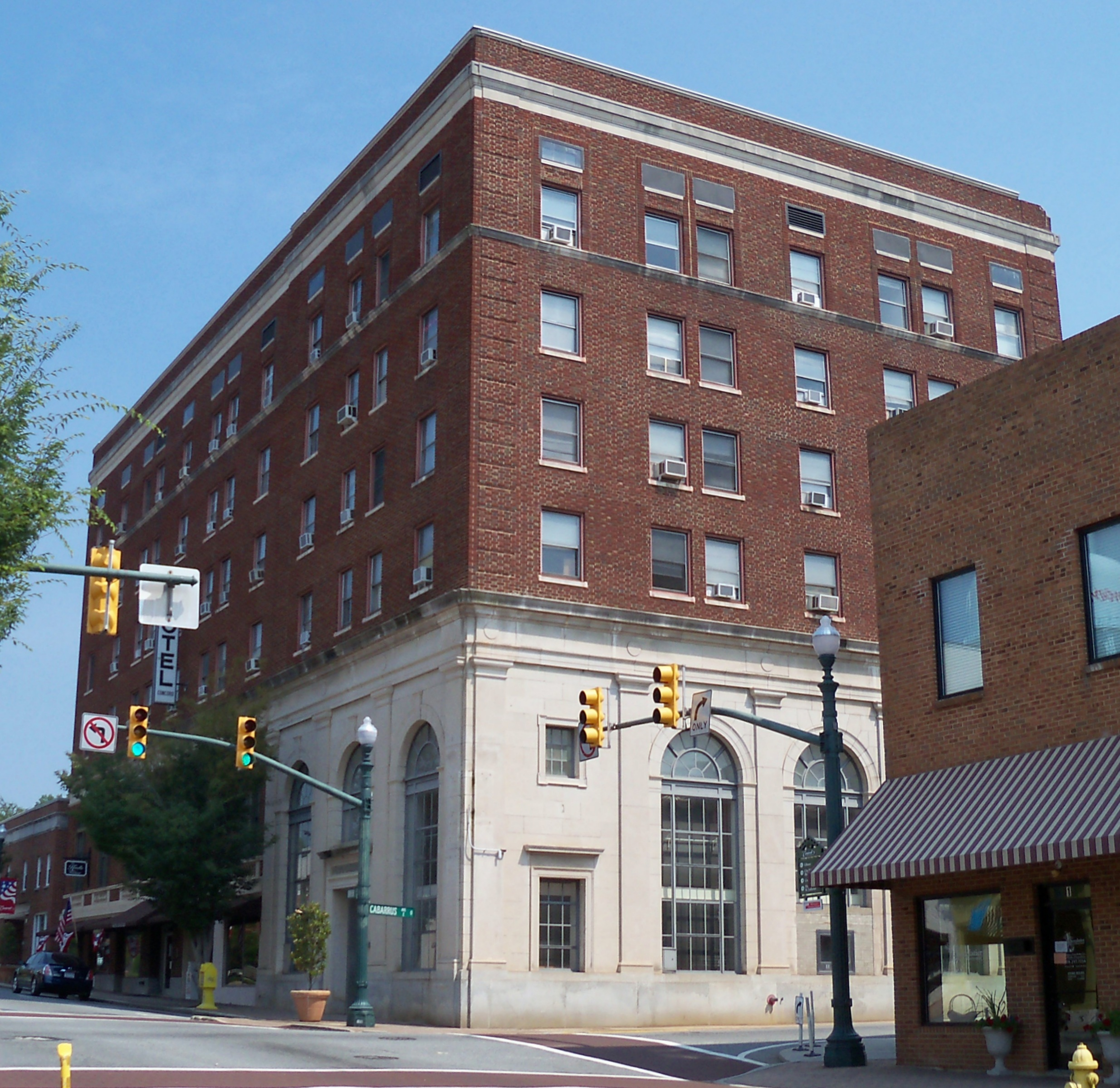
Hotel Concord

Concord, located in today's rapidly growing northeast quadrant of the Charlotte metropolitan area, was first settled about 1750 by German and Scots-Irish settlers. The name Concord means "to bring into harmony". This name was chosen after a lengthy dispute between the German Lutherans and Scotch-Irish Presbyterians over where the county seat should be located. Concord is considered a relatively old town by US standards, as it was incorporated in 1806. Today, markers identifying the original town limits can be seen in the downtown area.

As county seat, Concord became a center of trade and retail for the cotton-producing region, especially on court days. The downtown would be crowded with farmers and townfolk, in addition to lawyers and their clients. During the antebellum era, wealth was built by planters through the cultivation of cotton as a commodity crop; the work was done by enslaved African Americans.

Based on wealth from cotton as a commodity crop and through textile manufacturing, Concord's white slave owners and business owners built some significant homes in the late nineteenth and early twentieth centuries; they range along North and South Union Street and Edgewood Avenue. Within the North Union Historic District is Memorial Garden. Located on 3 acres (12,000 m^{2}), the garden winds through the 200-year-old cemetery of the First Presbyterian Church.

Located in the Piedmont, Concord became a site of industrialization with cotton mills in the late 19th century. Among the owners of the new mills in the area were men of the rising black middle-class in Wilmington, North Carolina, such as Warren Clay Coleman, John C. Dancy (appointed as collector of customs at the port), and others, who organized Coleman Manufacturing Company in 1897. They built and operated what is believed to have been the first cotton mill owned by blacks in the nation. They hoped to promote economic security for people of color. However, the Wilmington massacre of 1898, with white attacks on black areas of the city, caused many deaths, as well as destroying homes and businesses built by blacks since the Civil War. In 1900, Dancy was among more than 2000 black people who left the city permanently after the riot. He moved to Washington, DC, appointed as the federal Recorder of Deeds, and had served until 1910. The mill operated under black ownership through 1904, hitting difficult times after Coleman died. The brick mill building was later taken over by Fieldcrest Cannon. It was enlarged and added on to, nearly doubling its square footage.

From the time of incorporation in the late 1700s through the 1970s, Concord's jurisdiction was centered around the downtown area. Since then, most annexations have taken place west of the center-city area toward Charlotte. Portions of the city limit boundary adjoin the Cabarrus/Mecklenburg County line.

== Geography ==
Concord is located in western Cabarrus County, and has a total area of 64.04 square miles (165.9 km^{2}), of which 64.00 square miles (165.8 km^{2}) is land and 0.04 square miles (0.10 km^{2}) (0.06%) is water.

Concord is located northeast of Charlotte, the largest city in North Carolina. Concord is the second-largest city in the Charlotte Metropolitan Area. It is positioned about halfway between Charlotte and Salisbury. Several other smaller cities and towns are located close to Concord, including Kannapolis, China Grove, Landis, Mount Pleasant, Harrisburg, Midland, and Locust.

=== Climate ===
Concord has a humid subtropical climate (Köppen climate classification Cfa), with cool to mild winters and hot, humid summers. The city is located in the Piedmont area of North Carolina, which is characterized by rolling hills and forest.

The average high temperature in the winter is 43 °F (6 °C), and the average daily low temperature is 29 °F (−2 °C). In the summer the average temperature is 79 °F (26 °C), and the average daily high temperature is 88 °F (31 °C). It is not unusual for summer daytime temperatures to reach in the mid to upper 90s and occasionally exceed 100 °F (38 °C). It is typical for winter temperatures to fall into the teens at night, but temperatures generally warm to above freezing during the day. Summer months are characterized as having cool to warm nights with very warm to hot temperatures during the day.

The area receives a generous amount of rainfall at 43.8 inches (1,110 mm) per year, with February and April being the two driest months. Rainfall in the winter is lighter but more frequent, whereas rainfall in the summer is heavier but less frequent. Thunderstorms, both light and strong, are common in the spring and summer months. The sun shines 70 percent of the time in summer and 55 percent in winter. The prevailing wind is from the southwest, with the average highest wind speed of 9 miles per hour (14 km/h) in spring.

Climate data for Concord, North Carolina (1991-2020 normals, extremes 1891–present)
Month	Jan	Feb	Mar	Apr	May	Jun	Jul	Aug	Sep	Oct	Nov	Dec	Year
Record high °F (°C)	79 (26)	82 (28)	91 (33)	95 (35)	100 (38)	104 (40)	106 (41)	107 (42)	104 (40)	98 (37)	88 (31)	81 (27)	107 (42)
Mean daily maximum °F (°C)	52.8 (11.6)	56.7 (13.7)	64.5 (18.1)	74.1 (23.4)	81.4 (27.4)	88.4 (31.3)	91.8 (33.2)	89.8 (32.1)	84.0 (28.9)	74.4 (23.6)	63.9 (17.7)	55.6 (13.1)	73.1 (22.8)
Daily mean °F (°C)	40.8 (4.9)	44.1 (6.7)	51.3 (10.7)	60.4 (15.8)	68.8 (20.4)	76.6 (24.8)	80.3 (26.8)	78.5 (25.8)	72.2 (22.3)	61.1 (16.2)	50.5 (10.3)	43.6 (6.4)	60.7 (15.9)
Mean daily minimum °F (°C)	28.9 (−1.7)	31.4 (−0.3)	38.1 (3.4)	46.8 (8.2)	56.1 (13.4)	64.9 (18.3)	68.7 (20.4)	67.2 (19.6)	60.5 (15.8)	47.9 (8.8)	37.2 (2.9)	31.6 (−0.2)	48.3 (9.0)
Record low °F (°C)	−5 (−21)	2 (−17)	1 (−17)	24 (−4)	32 (0)	43 (6)	49 (9)	49 (9)	37 (3)	24 (−4)	12 (−11)	4 (−16)	−5 (−21)
Average rainfall inches (mm)	3.68 (93)	3.12 (79)	4.10 (104)	4.03 (102)	3.71 (94)	4.67 (119)	5.31 (135)	4.53 (115)	4.24 (108)	3.49 (89)	3.48 (88)	3.51 (89)	47.87 (1,215)
Average snowfall inches (cm)	1.1 (2.8)	1.3 (3.3)	0.4 (1.0)	0 (0)	0 (0)	0 (0)	0 (0)	0 (0)	0 (0)	0 (0)	0 (0)	0.5 (1.3)	3.3 (8.4)
Source: NOAA

== Demographics ==
Historical population
Census	Pop.	Note	%±
1870	878		—
1880	1,264		44.0%
1890	4,339		243.3%
1900	7,910		82.3%
1910	8,715		10.2%
1920	9,903		13.6%
1930	11,820		19.4%
1940	15,572		31.7%
1950	16,486		5.9%
1960	17,799		8.0%
1970	18,464		3.7%
1980	16,942		−8.2%
1990	27,347		61.4%
2000	55,977		104.7%
2010	79,066		41.2%
2020	105,240		33.1%
2025 (est.)	114,598	▲	8.9%
U.S. Decennial Census; 2020

=== 2020 census ===
Concord, North Carolina – Racial and ethnic composition Note: the US Census treats Hispanic/Latino as an ethnic category. This table excludes Latinos from the racial categories and assigns them to a separate category. Hispanics/Latinos may be of any race.
Race / Ethnicity (NH = Non-Hispanic)	Pop 2000	Pop 2010	Pop 2020	% 2000	% 2010	% 2020
White alone (NH)	41,985	51,843	55,333	75.00%	65.57%	52.58%
Black or African American alone (NH)	8,304	13,717	22,986	14.83%	17.35%	21.84%
Native American or Alaska Native alone (NH)	138	189	236	0.25%	0.24%	0.22%
Asian alone (NH)	670	2,018	7,050	1.20%	2.55%	6.70%
Native Hawaiian or Pacific Islander alone (NH)	8	47	61	0.01%	0.06%	0.06%
Other race alone (NH)	64	160	569	0.11%	0.20%	0.54%
Mixed race or Multiracial (NH)	439	1,338	4,368	0.78%	1.69%	4.15%
Hispanic or Latino (any race)	4,369	9,754	14,637	7.80%	12.34%	13.91%
Total	55,977	79,066	105,240	100.00%	100.00%	100.00%

As of the 2020 census, there were 105,240 people, 30,660 households, and 21,013 families residing in the city.

=== 2010 census ===
At the 2010 census, Concord's population is 79,066. Of those persons claiming to be of one race, the racial breakdown is 70.4% white, 17.8% black or African American, 2.6% Asian, 0.3% Native American, 0.1% Pacific islander, 6.4% of other races. Persons of two or more races are 2.3%. Persons belonging to the Hispanic or Latino race are 12.3%. There are 32,130 housing units in Concord. Of those housing units, 90.7% are occupied, and 9.3% are vacant.

=== 2000 census ===
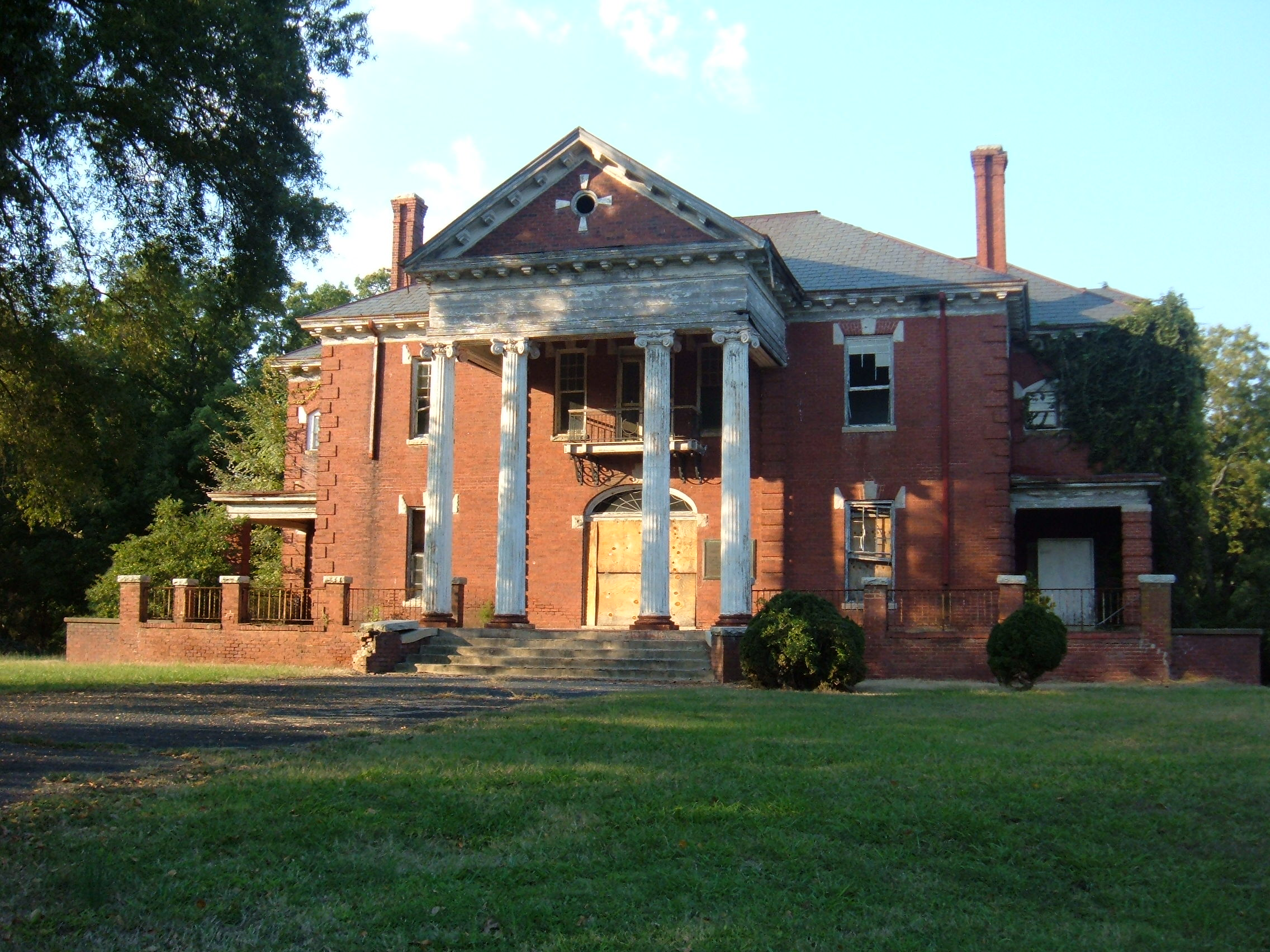
Stonewall Jackson Training School

At the 2000 census, there were 55,977 people, 20,962 households, and 14,987 families residing in the city. The population density was 1,085.3 inhabitants per square mile (419.0/km^{2}). There were 22,485 housing units at an average density of 435.9 per square mile (168.3/km^{2}). The racial makeup of the city was 78.83% White, 15.10% African American, 0.30% Native American, 1.22% Asian, 0.03% Pacific Islander, 3.35% from other races, and 1.18% from two or more races. Hispanic or Latino people of any race were 7.80% of the population.

In 2000, there were 20,962 households, out of which 35.2% had children under the age of 18 living with them, 55.7% were married couples living together, 11.5% had a female householder with no husband present, and 28.5% were non-families. 23.6% of all households were made up of individuals, and 8.0% had someone living alone who was 65 years of age or older. The average household size was 2.61 and the average family size was 3.08.

In 2000, the city the population was spread out, with 26.2% under the age of 18, 8.9% from 18 to 24, 33.6% from 25 to 44, 20.2% from 45 to 64, and 11.1% who were 65 years of age or older. The median age was 34 years. For every 100 females, there were 95.5 males. For every 100 females age 18 and over, there were 92.8 males.

Also in 2000, the median income for a household in the city was $46,094, and the median income for a family was $53,571. Males had a median income of $37,030 versus $26,044 for females. The per capita income for the city was $21,523. About 5.8% of families and 8.2% of the population were below the poverty line, including 10.0% of those under age 18 and 12.7% of those age 65 or over.

=== Religion ===
The earliest settlers were mainly immigrants, German Lutherans and German Reformed Protestants, and Scots or Scotch Irish Presbyterians, who began settling in Cabarrus County in the 1750s. In 1773, the Zion (Organ) Church community and the St. Johns Church community of about sixty families commissioned two men, Christopher Rintelmann from Zion Church and Christopher Lyerly from St. Johns Church, to travel to London to seek permission from King George III to acquire a preacher (and a schoolteacher) from Hanover, Germany.

Adolphus Nussmann was chosen by the Consistory of Hanover and became the first Lutheran preacher in North Carolina. He served five churches from Salisbury to Concord, and subsequently established twenty congregations and five schools in the greater Concord, Cabarrus, and Rowan county areas.

Today the county has wide religious diversity, as well as strong overall religious affiliation rates. According to the 2000 Religion Report, more than 63% of area residents are affiliated with a local religious body. Concord is home to many churches including a Jewish congregation, Temple Or Olam and several Islamic worshiping communities including The Islamic Center of Concord.

== Economy ==
Concord has a diverse economy comprising shipping and transportation, banking, manufacturing, motorsports, and various service sectors.

=== Employers ===
Concord has many small businesses and several large employers such as Atrium Health, Cabarrus County Schools, Shoe Show, Inc., Celgard LLC, Connextions, Roush Fenway Racing, Sysco Foods, S&D Coffee, and Motor Racing Network, as well as CT Communications (also known as Concord Telephone), before being acquired by Windstream in 2007. The city is home to the international headquarters for ACN Inc.

According to the city's 2014 Comprehensive Annual Financial Report, the top employers in the city are:

#	Employer	# of employees
1	Atrium Health Cabarrus	4,500
2	Cabarrus County Schools	3,800
3	City of Concord	1,100
4	Cabarrus County Government	950
5	Connextions	900
6	Shoe Show	800
7	North Carolina Government	770
8	Kannapolis City Schools	750
9	S&D Coffee and Tea	625
10	Sysco	510

== Arts and culture ==
=== Shopping ===
Downtown shopping features merchants offering antiques, fine collectibles, arts and crafts, and a seasonal farmers market. Concord is also home to the large retail venue Concord Mills, and Charlotte Motor Speedway. These two are the primary economic driving forces of the city.

=== National Register of Historic Places ===
The Cabarrus County Courthouse was completed in 1876. A 16-foot (4.9 m) marble Civil War monument, dedicated in 1892, is located on the front lawn. The courthouse was recognized for its significance and listed in 1974 on the National Register of Historic Places. The historic courthouse now is the home of the Cabarrus Arts Council, the Davis Theater and Historic Cabarrus.

The Barber-Scotia College, Boger-Hartsell Farm, McCurdy Log House, Mill Hill, North Union Street Historic District, Odell-Locke-Randolph Cotton Mill, Reed Gold Mine, South Union Street Courthouse and Commercial Historic District, South Union Street Historic District, Spears House, Stonewall Jackson Training School Historic District, and Union Street North-Cabarrus Avenue Commercial Historic District are listed on the National Register of Historic Places.

=== Motorsports ===
Concord is the home to Charlotte Motor Speedway, a NASCAR Research and Development Office (which also is the headquarters for research for touring and sportscar racing operations), and several professional race teams, including Hendrick Motorsports, RFK Racing, Legacy Motor Club, and Chip Ganassi Racing. The speedway opened in 1959 by owner Bruton Smith, who is a native of Oakboro, North Carolina. Smith's company, Speedway Motorsports, Inc., owns Charlotte Motor Speedway. The company also owns and operates a dragstrip and dirt track facility adjacent to the speedway. Concord is also home to Windshear, Inc., a firm that owns a state-of-the-art wind tunnel facility used to test the aerodynamics of vehicles (mostly motorsports vehicles).

=== Attractions ===
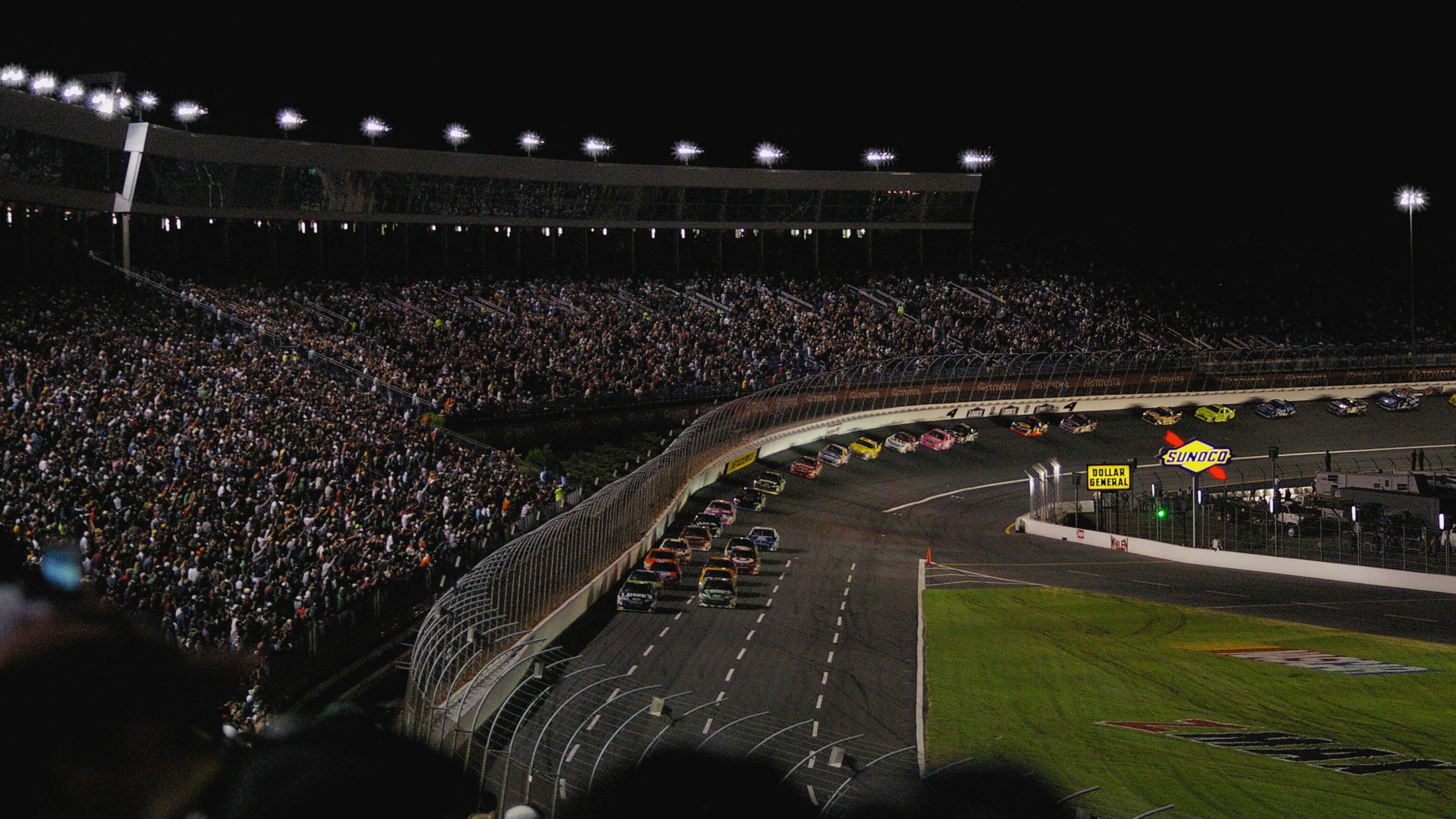
Night race at Charlotte Motor Speedway

Concord is home to several notable attractions. This includes two malls, a museum, a family resort, a NASCAR track, and an arena and events center that can be used for multiple purposes for the entire county.

- Cabarrus Arena & Events Center
- Carolina Mall
- Charlotte Motor Speedway
- Concord Mills
- Great Wolf Lodge
- zMax Dragway

== Parks and recreation ==
In 2000, Concord's city council implemented the "Partnerships for Stronger Neighborhoods" program. This program is designed to enhance the lives of residents in the neighborhoods in the city, increasing the quality of both life and events for those calling Concord home. As part of the program, some city staff members have volunteered to be appointed as liaisons to work directly with neighborhoods that participate in the program. Through this effort, strong communication is established between city government and its citizens. There are currently 45 neighborhoods participating in the program, which contributes to making Concord one of the most sought-after communities for homebuyers in the regional real estate market. Choices are diverse, offering modest homes to multimillion-dollar estates.

The City of Concord provides its neighborhoods with three recreational centers, eight parks, four sport complexes, an aquatics center featuring open swimming and swim lessons, Lake Fisher, with 3 miles (4.8 km) of lakefront and 534 acres (2.16 km^{2}) providing boating, fishing, greenways and bike paths. There is also the championship 18-hole Rocky River Golf Club (a Dan Maples design) owned and operated by the City and managed by a contracted company.

Private recreational opportunities are available, including the West Cabarrus YMCA and the Sportscenter. The West Cabarrus YMCA opened in the fall of 2003. The Sportscenter is a privately owned athletic and recreational facility.

== Government ==
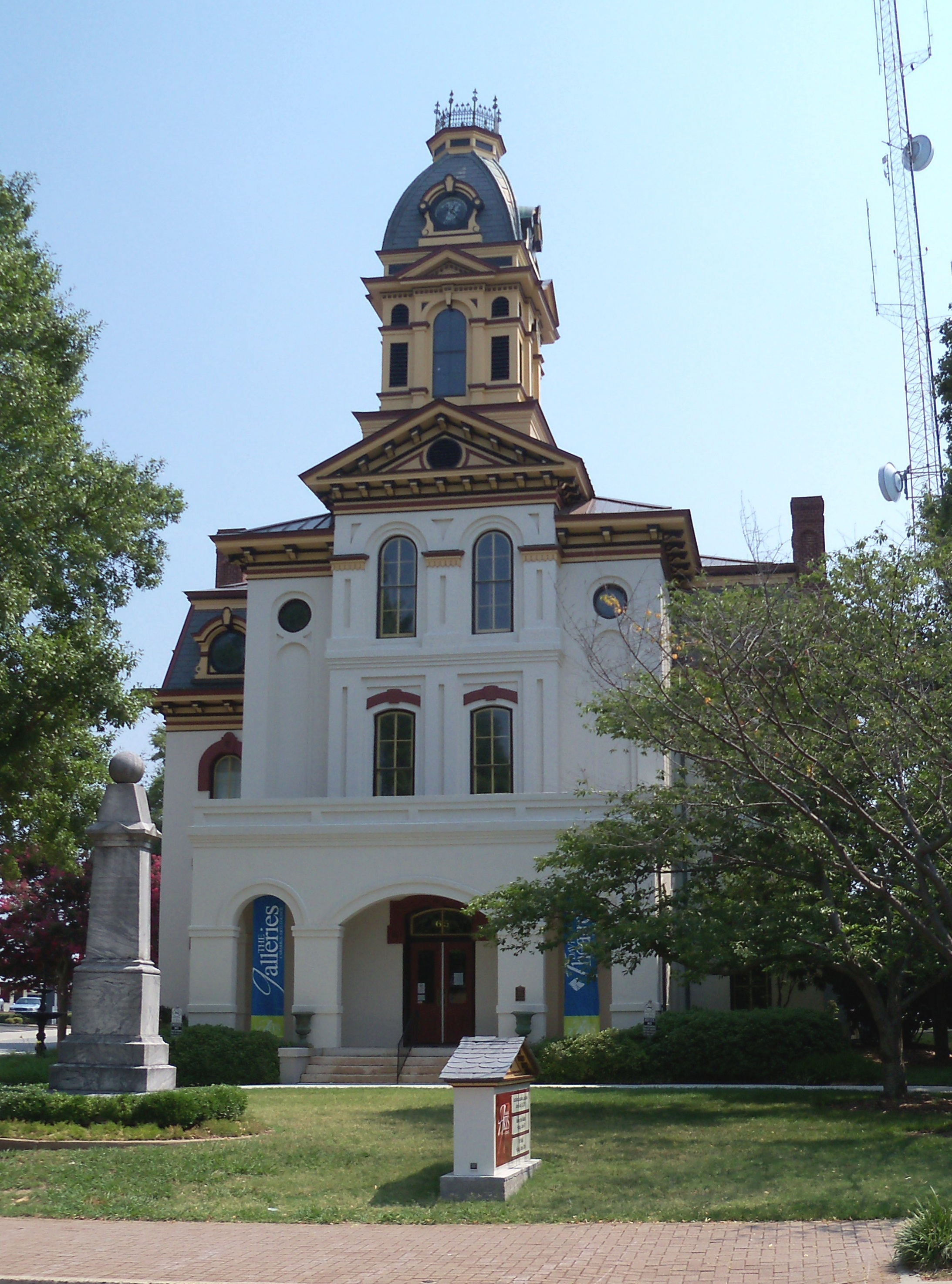
Historic court house in Downtown

Concord has a council-manager form of government. The mayor and city council are elected for four year terms, with no term limits. As a single body, the city council holds most of the power in the city government. For example, they have the power to pass ordinances, make resolutions, adopt plans, and establish the budget for the city. The mayor is ex officio chairman of the city council, and only votes in case of a tie. In addition to leadership roles, the mayor represents the city at special events and public appearances. The council appoints a professional city manager to manage and implement the decisions of the city council. In general, the municipal government structure consists of the mayor, seven city council members, and the appointed city manager. The current mayor of Concord is William C. "Bill" Dusch, and the current city manager is Lloyd Payne was appointed on April 1, 2018, following the retirement after 20 years of W. Brian Hiatt. Dusch was elected as mayor in 2017, following the retirement of previous mayor, J. Scott Padgett who served as mayor for 16 years.

The Concord city government offers a variety of services to its citizens. Six are required by North Carolina General Statute - fire, police, solid waste, street maintenance, water, and wastewater. Additional services that the city offers are electrical distribution, parks and recreation, stormwater system, transportation (streets maintenance and planning), economic development, planning and zoning, community development programs, environmental protection, a transit system, and operation of a regional airport. The operating budget for fiscal year 2012 totaled $207,724,003. The government generates its revenue from sources such as real property tax, sales tax distributions from the State, water and wastewater service fees, electrical utility fees, business privilege licenses, federal or state grants, investments, and other fees (such as parks and recreation, aviation, zoning, etc.). The revenues are distributed back to the community in the form of services.

== Education ==
Educational opportunities include public and private schools in elementary, secondary, and higher education. Publicly, the area in Concord is served by the Cabarrus County Schools system. There are 12 elementary schools in Concord, seven middle schools, and five high schools. Local private schools include Cannon School and Concord First Assembly Academy.

=== Higher education ===
- Rowan–Cabarrus Community College
- Cabarrus College of Health Sciences
- Barber-Scotia College

== Transportation ==
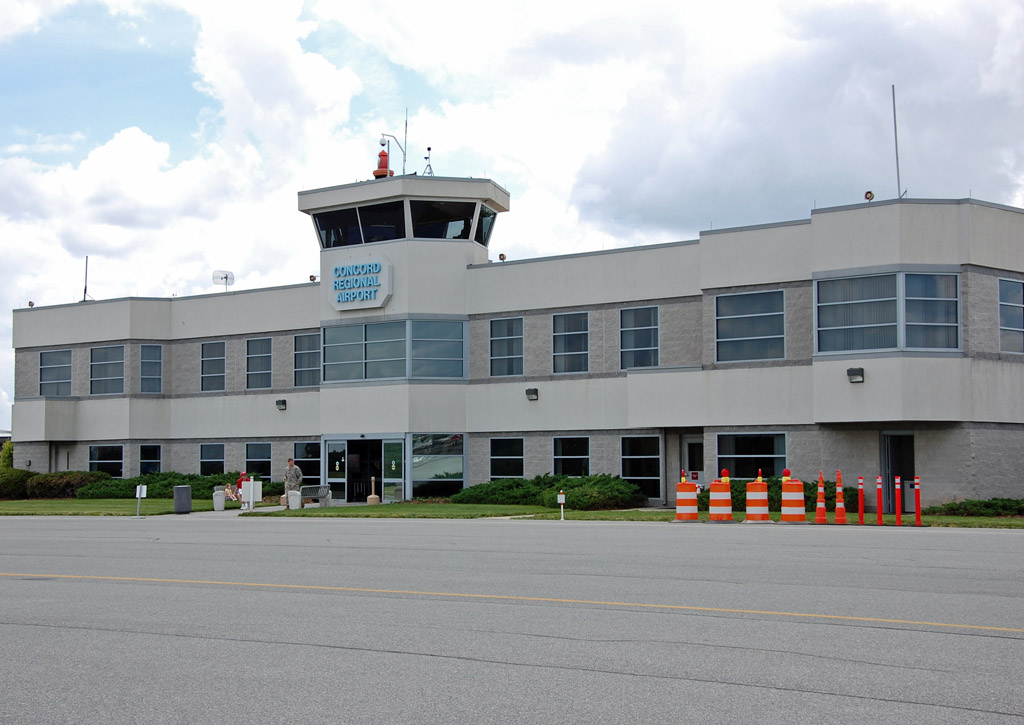
Concord Regional Airport

=== Highways ===
Interstate 85 links Concord directly to Greensboro and Durham to the northeast and Charlotte, Greenville, South Carolina, and Atlanta, Georgia to the southwest. Interstate 85 is eight lanes (four northbound, four southbound) through the city. Interstate 485 is located southwest of Concord and parallels the Cabarrus - Mecklenburg County line for several miles, providing access to the Charlotte area. US Highway 29 and US Highway 601 travel through Concord en route to other parts of the Carolinas. US 29 serves as an alternative to Interstate 85 for much of the distance between Charlotte and Greensboro.

=== Bus ===
Concord has a local bus system known as CKRider that provides service to Concord and Kannapolis. The system also links to Charlotte Area Transit System (CATS) via an express service as well as at regular service connection points. Greyhound also serves the area.

=== Rail ===
There is one railroad line that runs through Concord. It is owned by North Carolina Railroad. There are several industrial facilities served by this railroad line. There are no passenger stations located in Concord, but Amtrak has stations located in the adjacent cities of Kannapolis and Charlotte.

=== Air ===
Concord-Padgett Regional Airport (JQF) is an airport publicly owned and operated by the city of Concord. It is designated as a reliever facility for Charlotte Douglas International Airport (CLT). Charlotte Douglas provides Concord with a major domestic/international gateway. Concord-Padgett Regional Airport aviation activity consists of charter aircraft, limited commercial flights, flight schools, and private aircraft. The types of aircraft using the facility range from Cessna 150, to Beechcraft Bonanza, to Grumman Gulfstream IV, to Airbus A319-100, to Airbus A320-200. In 2013 Allegiant Air began providing commercial air service from Concord-Padgett Regional to cities in Florida and New Orleans.

== Notable people ==
- The Avett Brothers (Scott and Seth Avett), Grammy Nominated bluegrass-rock musicians
- Carol Barbee, television and movie actress, writer, and producer
- Joshua Boger, founder and CEO (retired), Vertex Pharmaceuticals Incorporated (NASDAQ: VRTX), S&P 500 company
- Leaky Black, college basketball player for the North Carolina Tar Heels
- Warren Clay Coleman, born into slavery, he became a successful businessman in Concord, and in 1896 was a founder of the first African-American owned and operated textile mill in the country
- Jackie Fargo, former professional wrestler
- Bill Fetzer, college football, basketball, and baseball coach
- Billy Goodman, professional baseball player for Boston Red Sox, Chicago White Sox
- Jay Graham, collegiate and NFL running back, current assistant coach at Florida State
- Fletcher L. Hartsell Jr., North Carolina senator
- Jody Hill, film director, screenwriter, producer, actor
- Jimmy Hitchcock, former NFL cornerback
- Nikita Koloff, retired WCW professional wrestler
- Lance Lewis, former NFL wide receiver
- Gaston Bullock Means, political figure, detective, part of Harding administration's "Ohio Gang"
- Blanche Taylor Moore, convicted murderer
- Jessica Moore, anchor and reporter, KSNV, WCBS-TV
- Wendell Moore Jr., Played college basketball for Duke University, NBA player for Detroit Pistons
- Mike Morton, linebacker for the North Carolina Tar Heels and four NFL teams
- Walter Moser (1881-1946), professional baseball player
- Clarence L. Partee, classical guitarist
- Israel Pickens, third Governor of Alabama and North Carolina congressman
- Bradley Pinion, NFL punter for the Atlanta Falcons
- John Milton Odell, industrialist and Confederate captain
- Robert D. Raiford, radio personality John Boy and Billy Big Show
- Lamont Reid, former NFL and CFL cornerback
- Rachel Reilly, reality television personality (winner of Big Brother 13)
- Bill Staton, professional pool player and restaurateur
- Corey Seager, former professional baseball player for the Los Angeles Dodgers and now with the Texas Rangers
- Kyle Seager, professional baseball player for the Seattle Mariners
- Ish Smith, NBA player, played collegiately at Wake Forest
- Clayton Spencer, 8th President of Bates College
- Silda Wall Spitzer, First Lady of New York from January 2007 until March 2008
- Aimy Steele, Founder and CEO of the New North Carolina Project
- Kerry Teague, NASCAR driver
- Elizabeth Threatt, model and actress
- Daniel Truhitte, played Rolfe in The Sound of Music
- Robert B. Tucker, founder and former CEO of Shoe Show.
- Skeet Ulrich, actor
- Gene Verble, professional baseball player
- Bubba Wallace, NASCAR driver
- Kenyan Weaks, Basketball Player

== Sister cities ==
Concord has three sister cities, as designated by Sister Cities International:

- Killarney, County Kerry, Ireland
- Freeport, Bahamas
- Siena, Tuscany, Italy

== See also ==
- List of municipalities in North Carolina
