= Central Cabarrus High School =

American public school in North Carolina

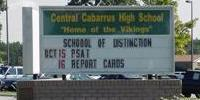

Location
- 505 Highway 49 South; Concord, North Carolina 28025; United States; 35°21′47″N 80°35′03″W

Information
- School type: Public
- Established: 1966 (60 years ago)
- School district: Cabarrus County Schools
- CEEB code: 340885
- Principal: Dustin Shoe
- Teaching staff: 75.31 (FTE)
- Enrollment: 1,323 (2023-2024)
- Student to teacher ratio: 17.57
- Colors: Forest green and gold
- Athletics: NCHSAA 6A
- Athletics conference: Greater Metro 6A/7A
- Nickname: Vikings
- Rival: Hickory Ridge, Mount Pleasant
- Website: cchs.cabarrus.k12.nc.us

Central Cabarrus High School, commonly referred to locally as Central or CCHS, is a comprehensive public high school located in Concord, North Carolina. It opened in 1966.

== History ==
Born in Central's first year of operation were publications, The Centarune, the school yearbook, and The Norlande, the school newspaper. Mr. Euell Gary Brady served as the first librarian with 8,000 books and 125 periodicals. "Dear Ruth," Central's first theatrical production was directed by Mrs. Marjorie Hudson. Director Neil Wilson led the first band which consisted of 40 members, and Mr. David Stantz was the first chorus teacher.

The 2015 film Paper Towns shot its high school scenes here.

== Academics ==
Central's academic curriculum falls in line with the North Carolina Standard Course of Study in all core subject areas. The school also offers a variety of Advanced Placement courses including AP Human Geography, AP Statistics, AP Biology, AP Studio Art, and many others.

As of the 2007–2008 school year, 3% of the student body were listed as pursuing advanced college prep courses and the average class size was 20 students.

Central has been consistently recognized as a "School of Distinction" under the state's ABC standards for public schools. English teacher Susan Deaton Parker was named Cabarrus County Teacher of the Year for the 2005–2006 academic year. Math teacher Allison Hahn was named Cabarrus County Teacher of the Year for the 2014–2015 academic year.

== STEM Magnet Program ==
Central Cabarrus is also home to a STEM magnet program, where students are able to take classes in relation to science, technology, engineering, mathematics, and design. Central is one of only two high schools in Cabarrus County's K–12 STEM Pipeline, the only program of its kind in the state of North Carolina. Students must apply in middle school for consideration into the program, where they must maintain an overall grade average of 80% (based on the final average of all courses taken each year). Students can take classes in Technology Design, Game Design, Photography, and STEM-oriented core classes, amongst other courses. While students take these courses with only other STEM students, they are free to take AP classes and electives with the general student body of the school.

== Marching Band ==
The marching band have been a finalist at the Bands of America Nationals Competition in 1987, 1988, and 1991.

== Notable alumni ==
- Carol Barbee — Hollywood producer of Jericho and Swingtown, writer, and actor
- Natrone Means — NFL running back and 1994 Pro Bowl selection
- Lamont Reid — NFL cornerback
- Jason Roberts — musician known for collaborations with Norah Jones, Hymns, Ben Kweller, and The Candles
- Ish Smith — NBA player, and 2023 NBA champion, played collegiately at Wake Forest
- Clark Whittington — creator of the Art-o-mat
