= John Milton Odell =

American soldier and industrialist

- Born: January 20, 1831
- Died: July 21, 1910 (aged 79)
- Occupation(s): Industrialist and Confederate officer
- Spouse(s): Rebecca Kirkman (m. 1859; died 1889) Addie A. White (m. 1891)

John Milton Odell (January 20, 1831–July 21, 1910) was an American industrialist and Confederate officer from Concord, North Carolina. He organized M Company, 22nd North Carolina Regiment and served as its captain during the American Civil War. He is considered one of the New South industrialists who flourished in the postwar era.

== Biography ==
=== Early life ===
He was born on January 20, 1831, to James and Anna O'Dell, farmers from Cedar Falls, North Carolina. His great-grandfather Nehemiah O'Dell was an Irish immigrant. After graduating from Middleton Academy, he became a schoolteacher at the age of 20. In 1856, he began working as a salesman for the Cedar Falls Manufacturing Company. In 1859, he married Rebecca Kirkman, with whom he had three children. He was a member of the Whig Party. He quit his job as a salesman during the outbreak of the American Civil War in 1861.

=== Civil War ===
He enlisted in the Confederate States Army during the Civil War serving under Colonel J. Johnston Pettigrew. Odell was captain of M Company, 22nd North Carolina Regiment, better known as the "Randolph Hornets" during the Peninsula campaign. His brother Laban served as first lieutenant in the same company. Odell resigned due to health issues after the Battle of Seven Pines, in 1862.

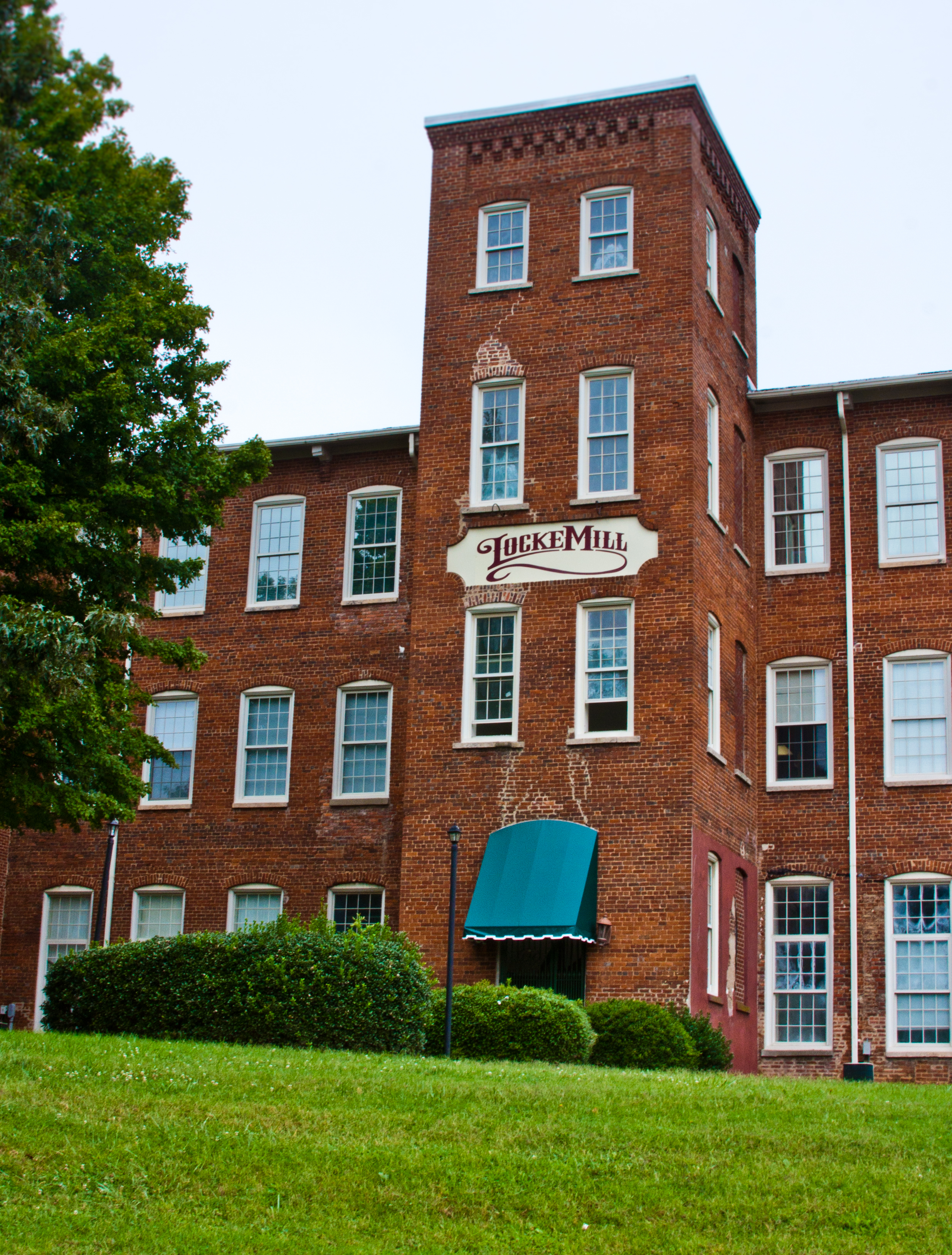
Odell-Locke-Randolph Cotton Mill in Concord

=== Industrialist, textile mills ===
Odell returned to Cedar Falls after the war and worked as a clerk. He also joined the Democratic Party. In 1869, he moved to Concord, North Carolina where he founded the hardware store Odell, Curtis & Company. He subsequently founded the general store Odell & Company in Greensboro in 1872. He became director of the National Bank of Greensboro, established 1876, and was president of the Concord National Bank and the Concord Electric Light Company.

During these years, Odell built a luxurious home on North Union Street and Buffalo Avenue in Concord, with a wraparound porch, carriage house, and central bay.

In 1877, Odell purchased the McDonald Cotton Mills, thereafter named the Odell-Locke-Randolph Cotton Mill. The town of Forest Hills, North Carolina developed as a result of the mill's success. He founded Odell Manufacturing Company in 1878, which manufactured "Forest Hills-plaids".

During his lifetime, he was president of several other companies including the Salisbury Cotton Mills, the Pearl Cotton Mills, the Southern Cotton Mills , the Cannon Manufacturing Company, the Magnolia Mills, and the Kerr Bag Manufacturing Company. Communities typically grew around these mills, marked by the appearance of churches and schoolhouses. The paternalistic ethos of Odell made a notable impression on his protege, James W. Cannon, founder of the Cannon Manufacturing Company.

Odell encouraged the young men who worked in his factories to play an active role in local church and political organizations. The social changes brought by industrialists like Odell had the effect of marginalizing older men and farmers who had previously played prominent roles in the community.

=== Later life and death ===
In 1889, Odell's wife Rebecca died. He remarried in 1891 to Addie A. White.

Odell was a Sunday school teacher at the Methodist Episcopal Church, South. He died on July 21, 1910 after suffering a stroke of paralysis. He was buried in Oakwood Cemetery in Concord.
