= Gem Theatre (Kannapolis, North Carolina) =

Historic theater in North Carolina, United States

Gem Theater

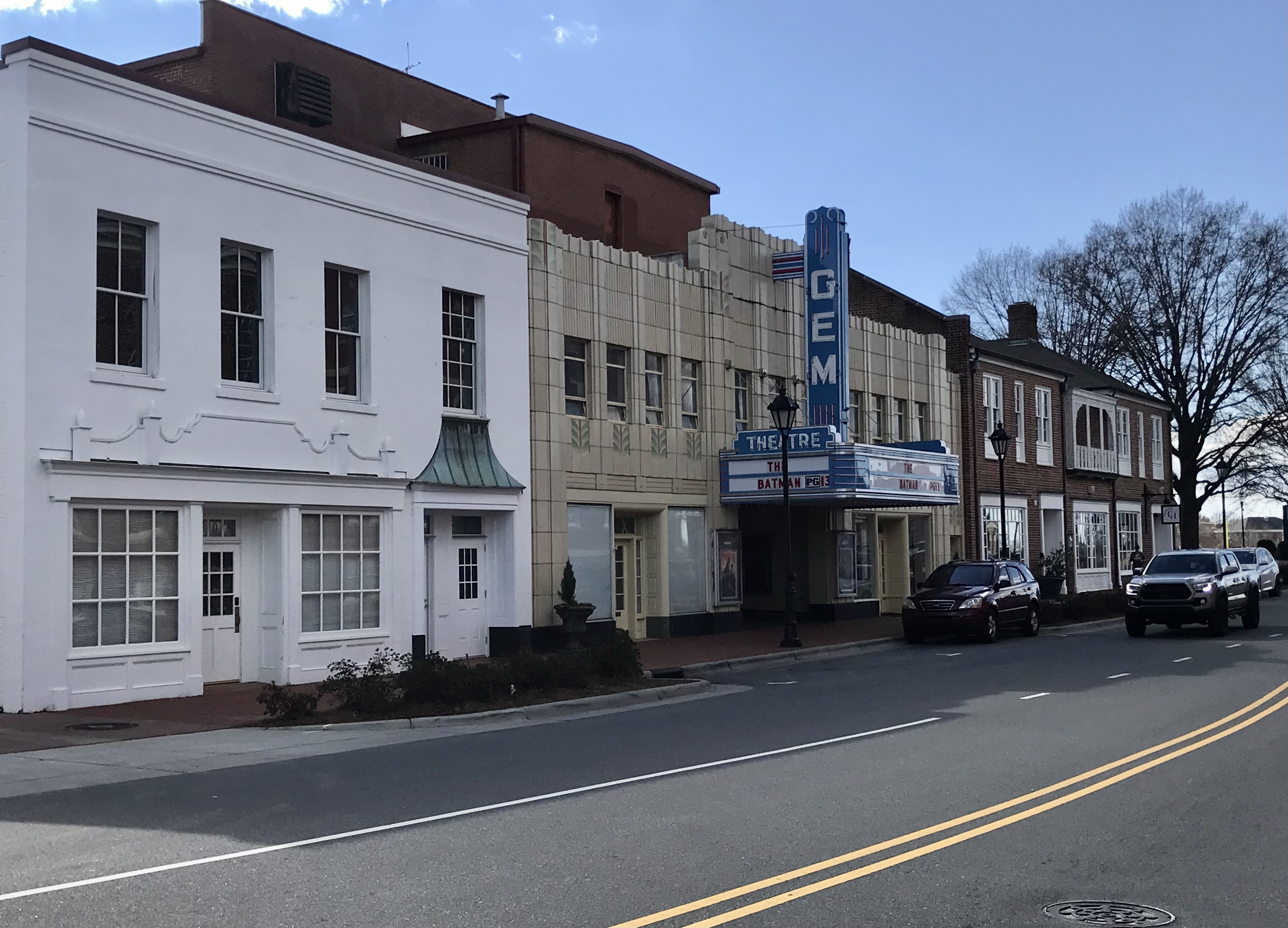
- The restored theatre in 2022
- Interactive map of Gem Theater
- Address: 111 West First Street; Kannapolis, North Carolina 89043
- Owner: City of Kannapolis
- Capacity: 708
- Type: Movie theater

Construction
- Opened: 1936
- Renovated: 2024

Website
- gem-theatre.com
- Gem Theatre
- U.S. National Register of Historic Places
- Location within North Carolina Location within the United States
- Coordinates: 35°29′54″N 80°37′29″W 35°29′54″N 80°37′29″W
- Built: 1936
- Architectural style: Art Deco
- NRHP reference No.: 100004322
- Added to NRHP: August 26, 2019

The Gem Theatre in Kannapolis, North Carolina is a theater first opened December 31, 1936, built by Cannon Mills for its workers. The Gem is one of the oldest movie theaters with one screen in the United States.

== History ==
After a 1942 fire, only the façade, offices, projection booth and part of the lobby remained. The theater was rebuilt and reopened in 1948 with 916 seats and a new balcony to replace the old one. Steve Morris bought a share of the theater in 1995 and became general manager and later the owner. With competition from newer theaters, the Gem showed movies that had already been shown elsewhere. First-run movies returned in 2000.

The city of Kannapolis bought the theater in 2015 as part of a downtown revitalization project. Renovations done in 2021 include the exterior, roof, and HVAC. The theater reopened May 16, 2024 after five months of interior renovations costing $1.2 million.

== Architecture ==
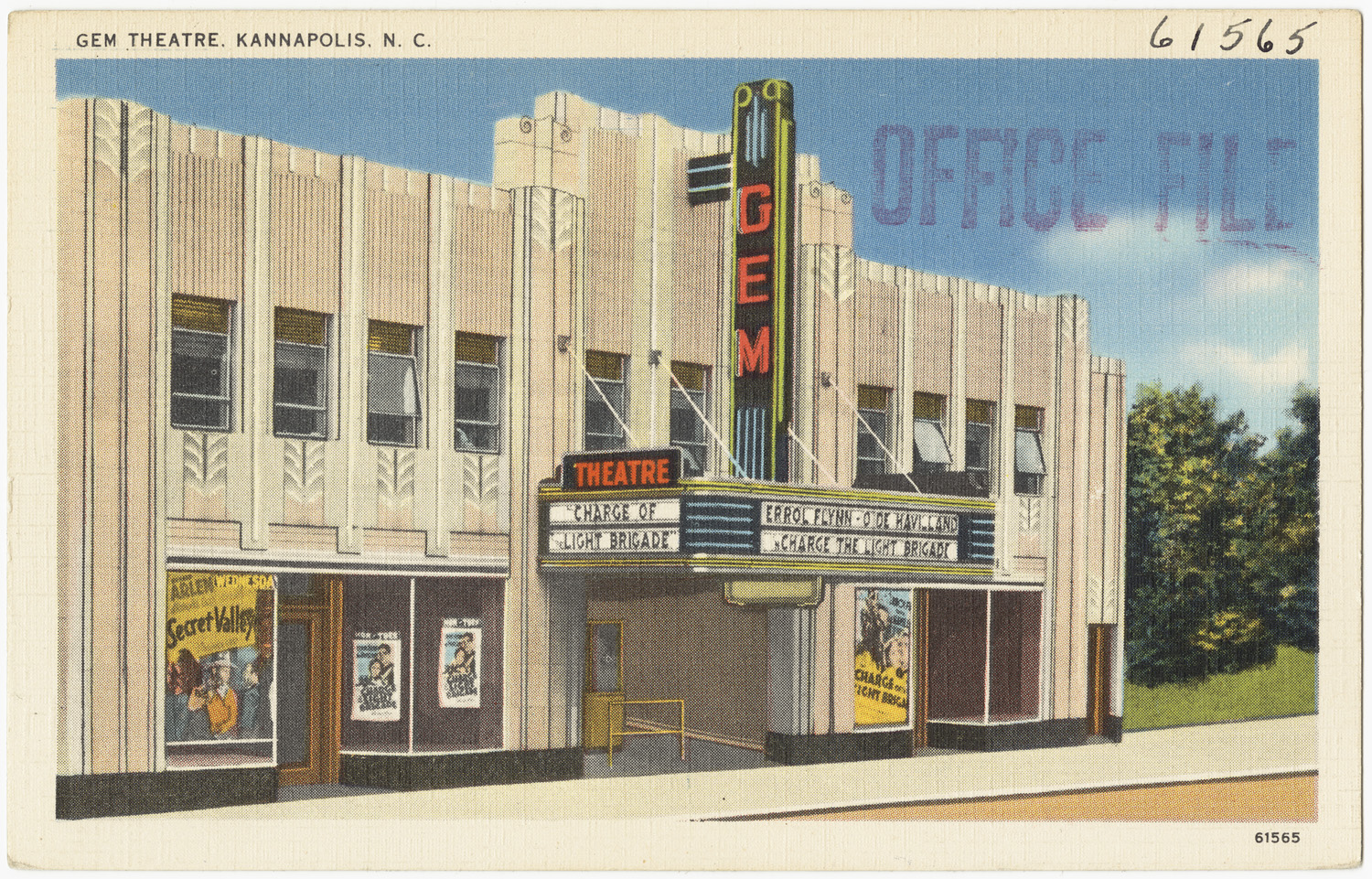
Postcard showing The Charge of the Light Brigade (1936) on the marquee

The theater building uses Art Deco designs including the prominent blue marquee, which includes about 50 neon lights. In the interior, the trough lighting was restored along the ceiling. In the theater itself, the screen is flanked by two original metalwork panels with stylized birds-of-paradise.

== See also ==
- National Register of Historic Places listings in Cabarrus County, North Carolina
