= Hickory Ridge High School =

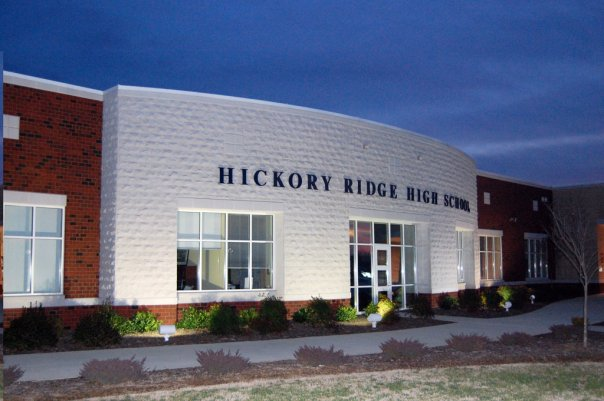

Location
- 7321 Raging Ridge Road; Harrisburg, North Carolina 28075; United States; 35°18′28″N 80°38′06″W

Information
- School type: Public high school
- Established: 2007 (19 years ago)
- School district: Cabarrus County Schools
- CEEB code: 341729
- Principal: Zafar Namher
- Teaching staff: 82.60 (on an FTE basis)
- Enrollment: 1,671 (2024–2025)
- Student to teacher ratio: 20.23
- Colors: Navy blue, silver, and white
- Athletics: NCHSAA 7A
- Athletics conference: Greater Metro 6A/7A
- Nickname: Ragin' Bulls
- Website: hrhs.cabarrus.k12.nc.us

Hickory Ridge High School is a comprehensive public high school in Harrisburg, North Carolina. It became the sixth high school in the Cabarrus County Schools system when it opened on August 27, 2007. It has been designated by the North Carolina Board of Education an Honor School of Excellence, North Carolina's highest distinction, for 2008–2009, 2009–2010, and 2010–2011. It is one of only four traditional high schools in the state to receive this honor.

== Student body ==
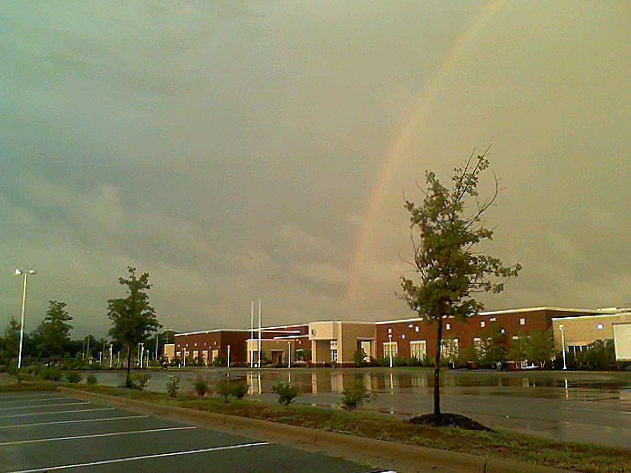
A rainbow above the school.

The student body consists of students in grades 9–12, with about 350 students per grade. 2010–2011 was the first year without students from feeder high schools Jay M. Robinson High School and Central Cabarrus High School. For the 2024–2025 school year the enrollment was 1,671.

== Notable alumni ==
- Jalen Brooks — NFL wide receiver
- Caleb Foster — college basketball player
- Garrett Williams — NFL cornerback
