= Lamont Reid =

American football player (born 1982)

No. 28,20,24,31
- Position: Cornerback

Personal information
- Born: May 4, 1982 (age 44); Concord, North Carolina, U.S.
- Listed height: 6 ft 0 in (1.83 m)
- Listed weight: 200 lb (91 kg)

Career information
- High school: Central Cabarrus (NC)
- College: NC State (2001–2004)
- NFL draft: 2005: undrafted

Career history
- Arizona Cardinals (2005)*; New York Jets (2005)*; Arizona Cardinals (2005); Denver Broncos (2007); Hamilton Tiger-Cats (2008–2009)
- * Offseason or practice squad member only
- Stats at Pro Football Reference

Michael Lamont Reid (born May 4, 1982) is a former gridiron football cornerback. He was signed by the Arizona Cardinals as an undrafted free agent in 2005. He played college football at North Carolina State.

Reid was also a member of the New York Jets and Denver Broncos.
