= Cabarrus County Schools =

Public school system in North Carolina, U.S.

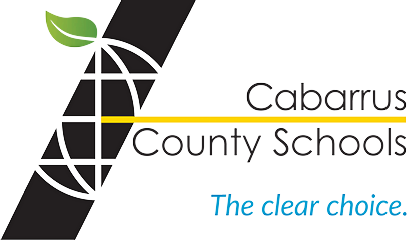

Location
- Cabarrus County, North Carolina

District information
- Motto: "Engaging minds. Shaping futures."
- Superintendent: John Kopicki
- Schools: 44

Students and staff
- Students: 35,000+
- Staff: 4400+

Other information
- Website: www.cabarrus.k12.nc.us

Cabarrus County Schools is a local education agency headquartered in Concord, North Carolina. The system presides over the vast majority of Cabarrus County, North Carolina, the exception being an area of Kannapolis in the northern part of the county that operates its own district. Over 35,000 students are enrolled in Cabarrus County Schools, and the school system has over 4,400 employees. The current superintendent is Dr. John Kopicki.

== Schools ==
=== Traditional K-12 schools ===
The following lists the high schools of the system, including their feeder elementary and middle schools. Some exceptions to the following diagram exist, but this depiction is typically accurate. (Note: high schools are grades 9–12; middle schools 6–8; and elementary schools K-5)

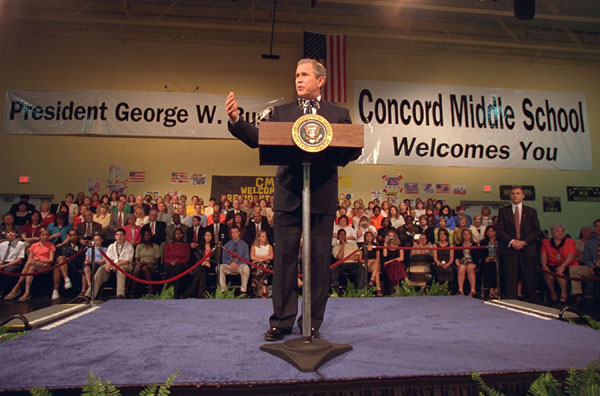
President George W. Bush giving a speech at Concord Middle School in 2001.

- Concord High School, 1895 (Spiders)
  - Concord Middle School
  - Harold Winkler Middle School (2011) (split)
    - Coltrane-Webb STEM Elementary School
    - R. Brown McAllister Elementary School
    - W.M. Irvin Elementary School
- Mount Pleasant High School, 1926 (Tigers)
  - Mount Pleasant Middle School
    - Mount Pleasant Elementary School
    - W.M. Irvin Elementary School
- Central Cabarrus High School, 1966 (Vikings)
  - C.C. Griffin Middle School
  - J.N. Fries Middle School
    - A.T. Allen Elementary School
    - Bethel Elementary School
    - Rocky River Elementary School
    - Wolf Meadow Elementary School
- Northwest Cabarrus High School, 1966 (Trojans)
  - Northwest Cabarrus Middle School
    - Charles E. Boger Elementary School (2007)
    - Weddington Hills Elementary School (split)
    - Winecoff Elementary School
    - W.R. Odell Elementary School
  - Harris Road Middle School (Split)
- Jay M. Robinson High School, 2001 (Bulldogs)
  - Harold Winkler Middle School (2011) (split)
    - Carl A. Furr Elementary School (2007)
    - Pitts School Road Elementary School
    - Wolf Meadow Elementary School
    - Weddington Hills Elementary School (split)
- Hickory Ridge High School, 2007 (Raging Bulls)
  - C.C. Griffin Middle School
  - Hickory Ridge Middle School (2010)
    - Pitts School Road Elementary School (split)
    - Rocky River Elementary School
    - Patriots Elementary School
    - Harrisburg Elementary School
- Cox Mill High School, 2009 (Chargers)
  - Harris Road Middle School (split)
    - Cox Mill Elementary School (2002)
    - W.R. Odell Elementary School (first established in 1929)
- West Cabarrus High School, 2020 (Wolverines)

=== Non-traditional schools ===
- Opportunity School – Glenn Center (alternative school)
- Mary Frances Wall Center (preschool)
- Cabarrus-Kannapolis Early College High School
- Cabarrus Early College of Technology
- Cabarrus Health Sciences Institute
- Performance Learning Center
- Royal Oaks School of the Arts (Formerly Royal Oaks Elementary School)
- Cabarrus Virtual Academy

== J.N. Fries Middle School ==
J.N. Fries Middle School is a magnet school in the Cabarrus County Schools system. It offers a STEM program.

=== History ===
J.N. Fries opened in 1990 with a designed capacity of 900 students. It was a traditional middle school, named after the late Dr. Joseph Nelson Fries. He served as CCS superintendent from 1977 to 1988 and led the county through many transitions. By 1995, the school had over 1,230 students. The original middle school fed into Central Cabarrus High and at its peak (before it became a magnet) had 1,542 students. The mascot was named the Knight, often referred to as the Noble Knight. It has been named a School of Distinction for many years in North Carolina.

In the 2011–2012 school year, J.N. Fries reopened as a magnet school, housing the STEM and International Studies programs. Since then, students residing in Cabarrus County can apply to attend J.N. Fries. Those who meet the academic requirements are then placed into a lottery if there are no slots currently available.

=== Principals ===
The stem school (after its reopening) has been headed by four principals:

- Dr. Kecia Coln (Note: Dr. Coln opened the magnet program at J.N. Fries and left the school for the CCS Human Resources Department during the 2014–2015 school year. She was also Principal of the Year that year for the school system.)
- Dr. Jim Williams (Note: Dr. Williams served as an interim principal at J.N. Fries through the end of the 2014–2015 school year. At the time, he was also principal of the Performance Learning Center (PLC), which is located on J.N. Fries's campus. After Kristy Bullock was appointed principal, Williams went back to serving as principal at the PLC.)
- Kristy Bullock (Note: Bullock arrived at the beginning of the 2015–2016 school year. Until then, she was principal at C.C. Griffin Middle School.)
- Sherry Lee (she previously served at Harris Road Middle)

The current STEM Coach is Megan Charlton.

=== Clubs ===
Several different clubs are offered at J.N. Fries, including FBLA, Arts and Crafts, Battle of the Books, Honor Band, Open Gym, Community Service, and many more.

=== Dr. Joseph Nelson Fries ===
Dr. Fries was born Aug. 16, 1927 in Rowan County, to the late Joseph Abram (Jack) Fries and Nellie Penley Fries. He graduated from Boyden High School, earned his bachelor's degree from Catawba College, completed his master's studies at Appalachian State University, and received his advanced administration certificate from the University of North Carolina at Chapel Hill. He was awarded his doctorate degree in education from Duke University. During World War II, he voluntarily served in the United States Army, Btry. B 3rd BN. 1st Regt. R.T.C. final station, Okinawa, Japan.

His uncle Channing Hilliard Fries, Jr. first hired him as a teacher and coach in Nashville. After moving to Concord, he taught sixth grade at Clara Harris School. He served as the first principal of Beverly Hills School from 1954 to 1965. Dr. Fries devoted over 39 years of his professional career to public education in North Carolina, having served as superintendent of Cabarrus County Schools from 1977 to 1988. Dr. Fries was a member of numerous professional organizations and boards, including the Cabarrus County Fair Board and the Rotary Club. He served as president of the North Carolina Association of School Administrators, the Concord Kiwanis Club, and the Cabarrus County Retired School Personnel of NCAE. He encouraged everyone to continue their education. Following his retirement, J.N. Fries Middle School was named to honor his commitment to the children of Cabarrus County.

== Growth ==
As the population of Cabarrus County has exploded over the past fifteen years, so too has the size of the school system. In 2001 the county opened Jay M. Robinson High School, the first new high school in Cabarrus County in 35 years. However, new schools at all three levels tend to become quickly overcrowded (Robinson High School, built for 1,500 students, opened in the fall of 2005 with nearly 1,800 students enrolled). Therefore, new schools are being constantly planned and added, with eight new schools having been constructed since 1996 (plus four new buildings for outdated existing schools). The 2016–17 school year saw an opening of another new elementary school, the Odell 3–5 building (Odell Elementary School), which was constructed on the old Odell site. The Odell already in place will become the K-2 building and will be called Odell Primary School. Two new schools are scheduled to open in the 2020–2021 school year, West Cabarrus High School as well as Hickory Ridge Elementary School.

== Soccer partnership ==
Since 2005 FC Carolina Alliance Youth Soccer Club has served as the administrator for Cabarrus County Schools Middle School Soccer League. FCCA provides the venue, schedule, uniforms, coaches, referees, and end-of-season awards for a successful middle school soccer program. The program is open to all middle school boys and girls. Each school may enter a maximum of two teams in the boy's league, and two teams in the girl's league. (If a school is only able to form a co-ed team then that team will play in the boys division.) The program is run in a league format with an end-of-season play off tournament. Each team plays between 8–12 games, depending on their play-off results. The partnership with FCCA was terminated in 2014.

FCCA also works with Cabarrus County School's "Kid's Plus" after-school program, providing free soccer clinics to Cabarrus County elementary schools.

== See also ==
- Cabarrus County, North Carolina
- Kannapolis City Schools
- List of school districts in North Carolina
