= Hotel Concord =

Historic hotel in North Carolina, United States

- U.S. Historic district – Contributing property
- Location within North Carolina Location within the United States
- Location: Union Street, N., Concord, North Carolina
- Coordinates: 35°24′38″N 80°34′53″W
- Built: 1926
- Architect: William Lee Stoddart
- Architectural style: Beaux-Arts architecture
- Part of: Union Street North–Cabarrus Avenue Commercial Historic District (ID903001272)
- Designated CP: December 10, 2003

Hotel Concord, located at Union Street N. and Cabarrus Avenue in Concord, North Carolina, was completed in 1926. It is a contributing property to the Union Street North–Cabarrus Avenue Commercial Historic District.

This 46,536-square-foot building is the largest historic property in Cabarrus County, North Carolina and the second-largest privately owned building in downtown Concord.

Concord National Bank (later First Charter Bank) moved to the newly built Hotel Concord, a six-story Beaux Arts Classical Revival building featuring arch windows and a "faced of ashlar limestone ornamented with classical motifs." This architectural design was created by William Lee Stoddart.

In February 2016, the Union Street Corporation approved the sale of the hotel to Rehab Development. Subsequently, the city of Concord agreed to buy properties previously part of Fifth Third Bank and planned to donate those to Rehab Development.

Construction work on a $5.3 million Rehab Development project began in December 2016. This project included the hotel, the First Charter Bank building, and the Concord Telephone Company building on Cabarrus Avenue. The hotel was converted to 40 apartments on the four upper floors and seven commercial spaces, including an event venue already being used, featuring a ballroom, kitchen, lobby and part of the basement.

The apartments named The View at Hotel Concord started leasing on June 1, and the Union Street Market opened on the hotel's ground floor in July 2018.
