= Mount Pleasant Collegiate Institute Historic District =

Historic district in North Carolina, United States

- U.S. National Register of Historic Places
- U.S. Historic district
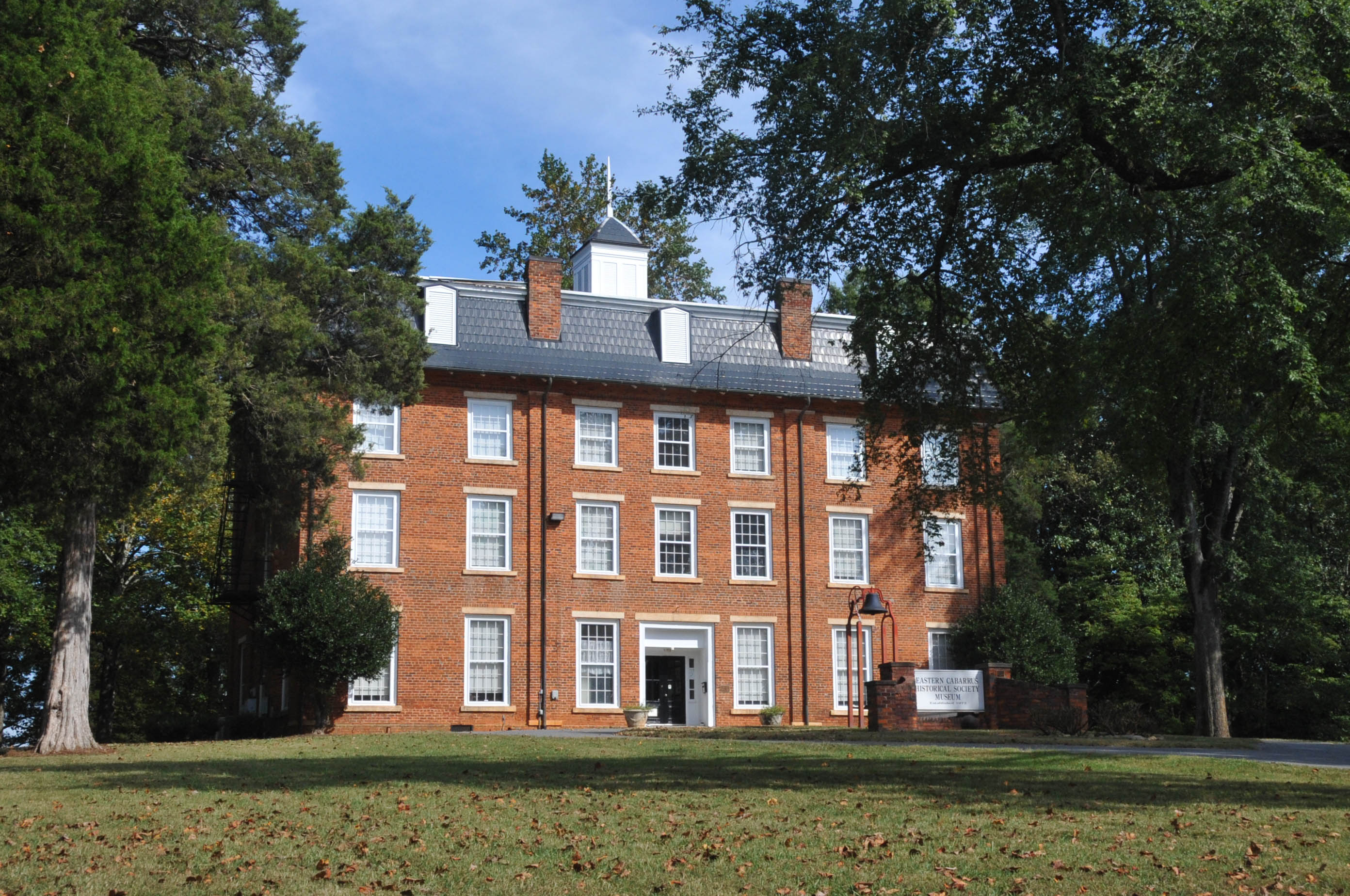
- Mount Pleasant Collegiate Institute, March 2007

- Location within North Carolina Location within the United States
- Location: Jct. of NC 49 and NC 73, Mount Pleasant, North Carolina
- Coordinates: 35°24′8″N 80°26′12″W
- Area: 10.2 acres (4.1 ha)
- Built: 1852
- Architectural style: Greek Revival
- NRHP reference No.: 79001686
- Added to NRHP: November 15, 1979

Mount Pleasant Collegiate Institute Historic District is a national historic district located at Mount Pleasant, Cabarrus County, North Carolina. The district encompasses six contributing buildings associated with the Mount Pleasant Collegiate Institute, also known as Western Carolina Male Academy and North Carolina College. They are the three-story brick Main Building (1854–1855); Greek Revival style President's House; Matthias Barrier house; Society Hall; the Boarding House (1868); and the New Building (1925). The Western Carolina Male Academy was established in 1852 by the North Carolina Synod of the Evangelical Lutheran Church of America. The institute closed in 1933 after which, in 1941, the property was put up to auction. The Lentz Hotel was moved inside the district boundaries in 1980.

It was listed on the National Register of Historic Places in 1979.
