= Union Street North–Cabarrus Avenue Commercial Historic District =

Historic district in North Carolina, United States

- U.S. National Register of Historic Places
- U.S. Historic district
- Location within North Carolina Location within the United States
- Location: Roughly Union St. N, Cabarrus Ave. E, Cabarrus Ave. W, and Church St. S, Concord, North Carolina
- Coordinates: 35°24′38″N 80°34′53″W
- Area: 3.5 acres (1.4 ha)
- Built: 1925
- Architect: Stoddard, William L.
- Architectural style: Early Commercial, Beaux Arts
- NRHP reference No.: 03001272
- Added to NRHP: December 10, 2003

Union Street North–Cabarrus Avenue Commercial Historic District is a national historic district located at Concord, Cabarrus County, North Carolina. The district encompasses 14 contributing buildings in the central business district of Concord. It primarily includes commercial buildings in popular architectural styles including Beaux-Arts style architecture. Located in the district are the Bell and Harris-Maxwell Brothers Furniture Store (1921–1924), Yorke and Wadsworth Company Warehouse (1908–1911), Lippard and Barrier Grocery (1908–1911), Concord National Bank and Hotel Concord (1926), Star Theatre (c. 1890; 1913–1920), Cannon Building and Concord Theatre (1920–1924; 1925), and Horton Building–Commerce and Merchants Building (1952).

It was listed on the National Register of Historic Places in 2003.
