= Odell-Locke-Randolph Cotton Mill =

Historic industrial building in North Carolina, US

- U.S. National Register of Historic Places
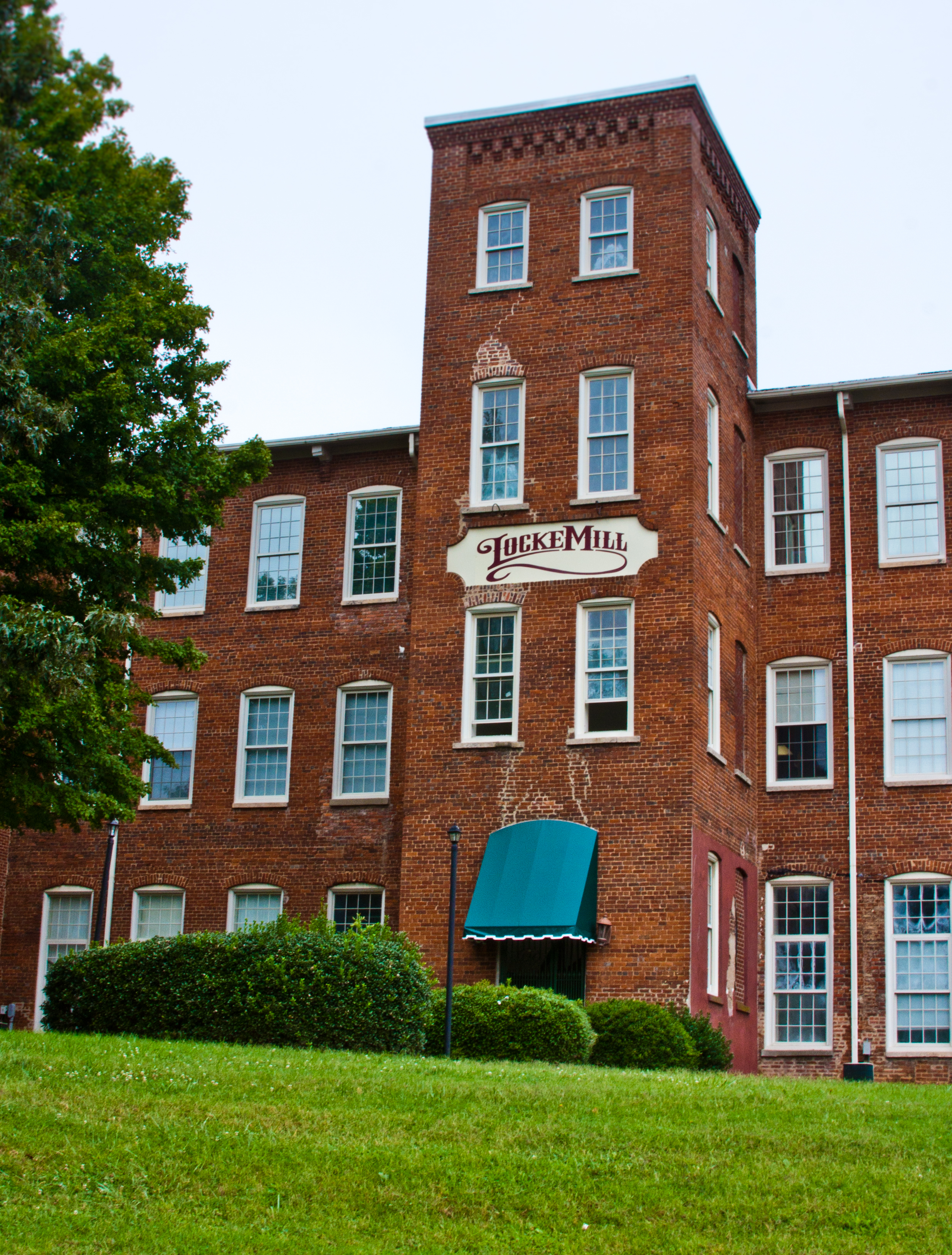

- Location within North Carolina Location within the United States
- Location: Buffalo, Church, Peachtree, and Locust Sts. Concord, North Carolina
- Coordinates: 35°25′06″N 80°35′26″W
- Area: 1 acre (0.40 ha)
- Built: 1839
- Architectural style: Early commercial
- NRHP reference No.: 83001838
- Added to NRHP: March 28, 1983

The Odell-Locke-Randolph Cotton Mill is an historic building in the city of Concord, Cabarrus County, North Carolina. The original mill was constructed in 1839, as the McDonald Cotton Mills, north of the town of Concord in what is now the Locke Mill Plaza. The building was placed on the National Register of Historic Places listings in Cabarrus County, North Carolina in 1983.

== History ==
The mill was constructed in 1839 as the Concord Steam Cotton Factory also known as the Barringer Mill. By 1842 the mill was producing cotton yarn, shirting, and other goods. By 1850 a railroad ran west of town and the mill had 70 employees. During the aftermath of the Civil War the mill became the McDonald Cotton Mill. John Milton Odell bought the buildings in 1877 and created the Odell Manufacturing Company in 1880.

The mill became the Locke Mill after reorganization from the bankrupt Odell Manufacturing Company in 1909. The mill became known as the Randolph Mill after another reorganization in 1939.
