= Mount Pleasant High School (North Carolina) =

Location
- 700 Walker Road; Mount Pleasant, North Carolina 28124; United States; 35°24′27″N 80°28′56″W

Information
- School type: Public
- School district: Cabarrus County Schools
- CEEB code: 342805
- Principal: Lacee Jacobs
- Teaching staff: 51.28 (FTE)
- Enrollment: 896 (2023-2024)
- Student to teacher ratio: 14.74
- Colors: Blue and gold
- Athletics conference: NCHSAA 4A; Rocky River 4A/5A Conference
- Nickname: Tigers
- Rival: Central Cabarrus High School
- Website: mphs.cabarrus.k12.nc.us

Mount Pleasant High School is a comprehensive public high school in Mount Pleasant, North Carolina, United States, in the Cabarrus County Schools system. The school's current campus opened in 1992.

== Athletics ==
Mount Pleasant is a member of the North Carolina High School Athletic Association (NCHSAA) and are classified as a 4A school. The school is a part of the Rocky River 4A/5A Conference.

Mount Pleasant's athletic teams are known as the Tigers. The school has sports teams in football, basketball, baseball, golf, cross country, track and field, tennis, swimming, volleyball, softball, wrestling, and soccer.

On August 14, 2023, the Cabarrus County Board of Education voted to name Tiger Stadium for Mike Johns, who retired after 23 years as football coach.

== History ==
The original two-story building opened November 15, 1926. The school had 138 students and six teachers. The next year there were 463 students and 13 teachers, and the first 10th grade graduating class had 13 members. In 1934 the school added ten rooms, and in 1952 a cafeteria was added, with students paying 25 cents for lunch.

The building which became the middle school was added in 1957.

After the new building opened, the original building was torn down. The former building, with additions, became Mount Pleasant Middle School.

== See also ==
- Education in the United States
