= Adolphus Nussmann =

Adolphus Nussmann (a.k.a. Adolph Nussmann, July 12, 1739 – November 3, 1794) was the first Lutheran missionary and preacher in North Carolina. Baptized a Catholic in the Liebfrauen cathedral at Münster, Westphalia, he joined the Franciscan Order before converting to Lutheranism.

== Coming to America ==
In 1773 Christopher Rintelmann of the Zion (Organ) Church community and Christopher Lyerly from the St. John's Church community in Mecklenburg (Cabarrus) County, NC—representing about sixty families—went at their own expense to London appearing before the Court of St. James's to secure permission from King George III to obtain from Hanover, Germany both a preacher and a school teacher. The British Crown did not allow preachers or teachers to immigrate to the American Colonies without express permission from the King, or the Anglican Church. With permission from King George III in hand they traveled to Hanover where the Consistory commissioned him to answer this call from North Carolina. John Gottfried Arends also accompanied Nussmann to be the community's schoolteacher. They sailed from Hanover, to London, and booked passage on a ship to Charlestown, South Carolina. Then they rode horseback to Mecklenburg County.

Nussmann preached his first sermon in North Carolina the second Sunday in August, 1773, at Zion (Organ) Lutheran Church, in Rowan County.

== Bicentennial commemorated ==
The North Carolina Synod commemorated Nussmann's ministry as they celebrated the bicentennial of the Lutheran ministry in North Carolina on August 12, 1973. A monument dedicated by the president of the Lutheran Southern Theological Seminary was unveiled commemorating Nussmann's arrival in North Carolina and his service for the Church, as well as his role in supporting the American Revolution as a patriot, despite having only arrived from Hanover, Germany, a mere three years before the signing of the Declaration of Independence. On one side of the monument, Nussmann's service in America was recorded and on the other side, is given the work of John Gottfried Arends, who came on the same ship from Hanover with Nussmann in 1773 as a schoolteacher. The monument reads:

The Reverend Adolph Nussmann (Service in America)

A man of tremendous faith, a scholar with theological insight, a Franciscan Christian with compassion for his fellowmen.

This Lutheran apostle to North Carolina saw twenty congregations established on the "most distant border of the civilized world" during the American Revolution and Independence (1773-1794).

He was baptized on the day of his birth, July 12, 1739, by the Catholic Church in Munster, Westphalia; was converted to the Lutheran faith from the Franciscan Order; was instructed in Lutheran theology at the University of Göttingen, and chosen by the Consistory of Hanover to answer the call from North Carolina. He supported the Patriots; though tortured by the Tories, stayed in North Carolina to proclaim the Word of God. He saw many members of St. John's Lutheran Church in Cabarrus County serve in the American Army.

After Independence, he enlisted help from the Helmstedt Missionary Society for the North Carolina Mission; lived to see five other Lutheran clergymen labor in the Piedmont; sponsored a school for every congregation; was appointed a trustee in 1785 by the General Assembly of North Carolina to establish an academy in Salisbury. With Christlike fortitude he showed the pioneers how to live and how to die.
