= Rocky River Presbyterian Church =

Historic church in North Carolina, United States

- U.S. National Register of Historic Places
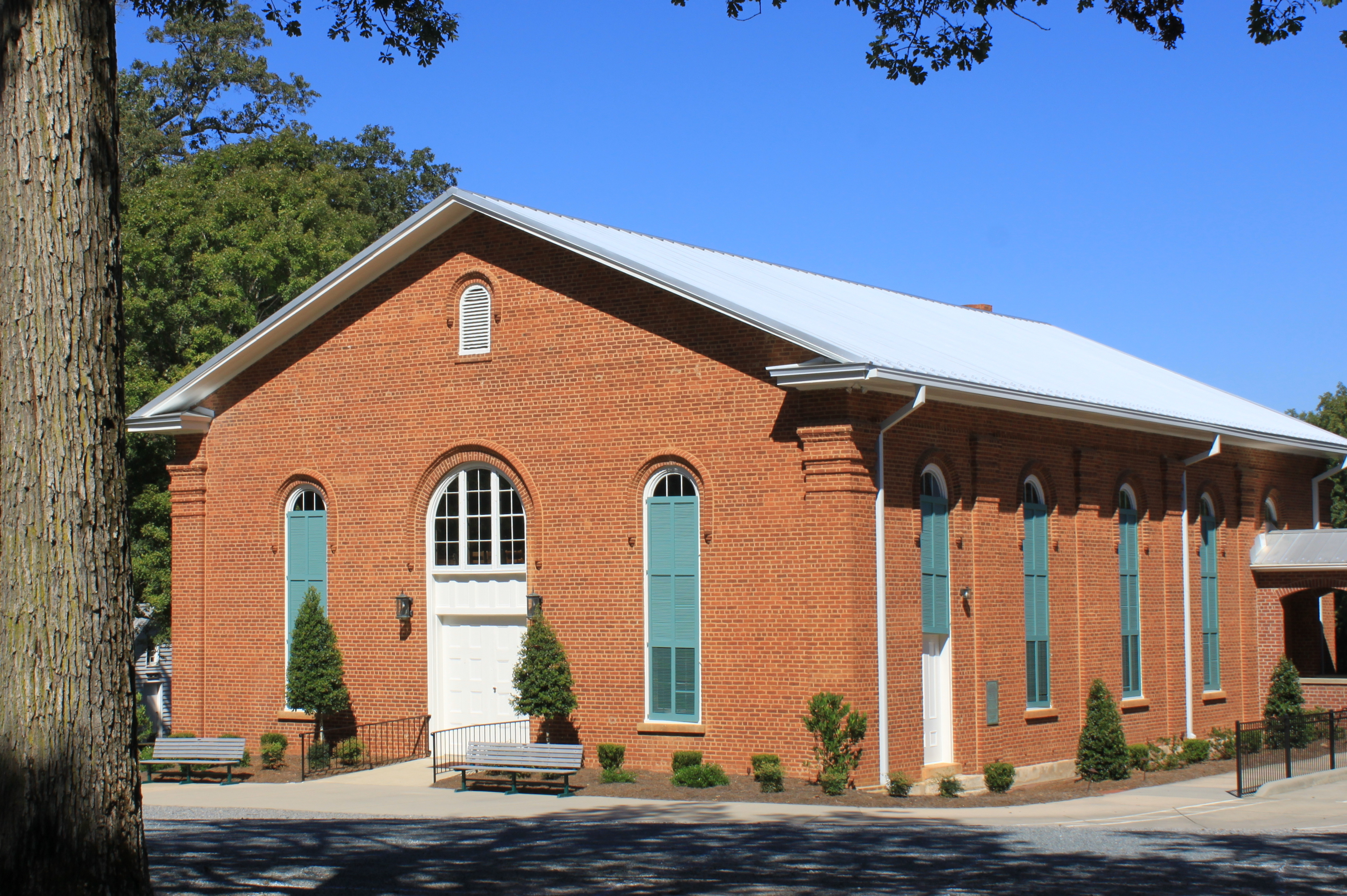

- Location within North Carolina Location within the United States
- Location: Jct. of NC 1139 and NC 1158, near Rocky River, North Carolina
- Coordinates: 35°18′9″N 80°35′58″W
- Area: 43 acres (17 ha)
- Built: 1839
- Architectural style: Greek Revival, Italianate
- NRHP reference No.: 86000419
- Added to NRHP: March 06, 1986

Rocky River Presbyterian Church is a historic Presbyterian church located near Rocky River, Cabarrus County, North Carolina. The property includes the Greco-Italianate style brick church (1860-1861); a frame Session House (1839); a small cemetery dating to 1814; and the two-story, brick Greek Revival and Italianate style Manse (1873).

It was listed on the National Register of Historic Places in 1986.
