= Favoni =

Historic house in North Carolina, United States

- Dr. Charles Favoni-Harris and William Shakespeare House
- U.S. National Register of Historic Places
- Location within North Carolina Location within the United States
- Location: SR 1445, near Poplar Tent, North Carolina
- Coordinates: 35°23′24″N 80°43′13″W
- Area: 10.7 acres (4.3 ha)
- Built: c. 1791, c. 1840
- Architectural style: Greek Revival, Georgian, Federal
- NRHP reference No.: 86000413
- Added to NRHP: March 5, 1986

Favoni, also known as Dr. Charles and William Shakespeare Harris House, is a historic home located near Poplar Tent, Cabarrus County, North Carolina. The two-story log section was built about 1791, with a two-story frame addition forming an L-shaped dwelling, about 1840. The original section has Georgian / Federal style design elements and the later section has Greek Revival style design elements.

It was listed on the National Register of Historic Places in 1986.
