= Mount Pleasant Historic District (Mount Pleasant, North Carolina) =

Historic district in North Carolina, United States

- U.S. National Register of Historic Places
- U.S. Historic district
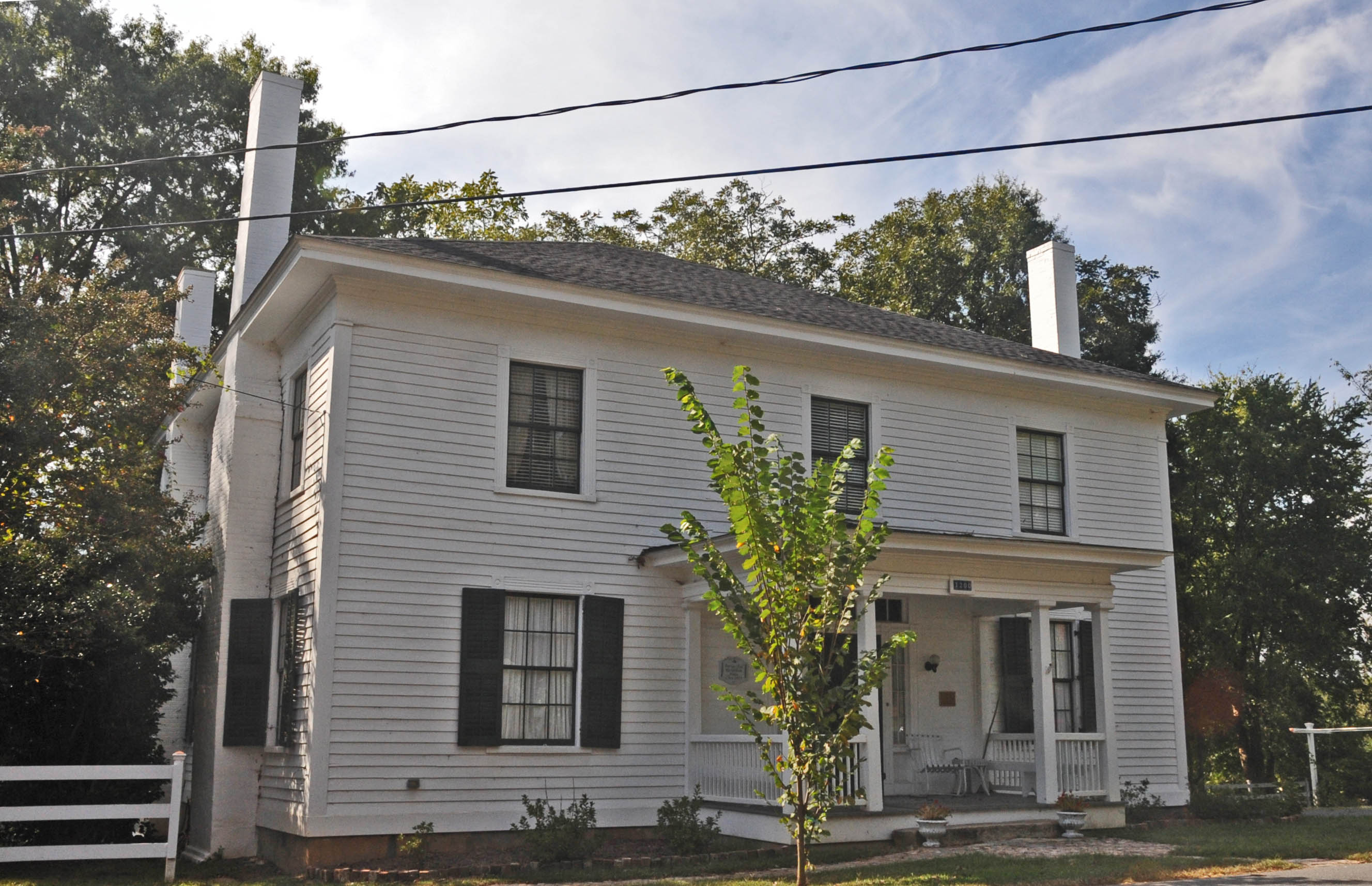
- Daniel Dixon Barrier House, (c. 1858),

- Location within North Carolina Location within the United States
- Location: Roughly W. and E. Franklin between N. Halifax and C and N and N. and S. Main Sts. between Boston and Broad Sts., Mount Pleasant, North Carolina
- Coordinates: 35°24′8″N 80°26′06″W
- Area: 42 acres (17 ha)
- Built by: Asbury, Louis H.; Et al.
- Architectural style: Colonial Revival, Bungalow/craftsman, Late Victorian
- NRHP reference No.: 86001050
- Added to NRHP: May 12, 1986

Mount Pleasant Historic District is a national historic district located at Mount Pleasant, Cabarrus County, North Carolina. The district encompasses 98 contributing buildings and 3 contributing structures in the town of Mount Pleasant. It includes residential, institutional, and commercial buildings in a variety of popular architectural styles including Victorian, Colonial Revival, and Bungalow / American Craftsman. Notable buildings include the Jacob Ludwig House, Kindley Mill Village houses, Saint James Evangelical and Reformed Church, Lutheran Church of the Holy Trinity, Mount Pleasant Milling Company, Kindley Cotton Mill, and Tuscarora Cotton Mill.

It was listed on the National Register of Historic Places in 1986.
