= McCurdy Log House =

Historic house in North Carolina, United States

- U.S. National Register of Historic Places
- Location within North Carolina Location within the United States
- Location: S of Concord off U.S. 601, near Concord, North Carolina
- Coordinates: 35°19′3″N 80°32′32″W
- Area: 9.5 acres (3.8 ha)
- Built: c. 1773
- Built by: McCurdy, Archibald
- NRHP reference No.: 74001329
- Added to NRHP: January 21, 1974

McCurdy Log House is an historic home located near Concord, Cabarrus County, North Carolina, USA. It was built about 1773 and is a one-story, double-pen log house. It was built by Archibald McCurdy, a farmer and tradesman and officer in the Continental Line.

It was listed on the National Register of Historic Places in 1974.
