= Kannapolis City Schools =

Location
- 100 Denver Street, Kannapolis, North Carolina 28083 Kannapolis / Cabarrus County

District information
- Motto: "Creating the Future"
- Superintendent: Dr. Sara Newell
- Schools: 9
- Budget: $50 million

Students and staff
- Students: 5626
- Teachers: 276

Other information
- Website: https://www.kcs.k12.nc.us

Kannapolis City Schools is a local education agency headquartered in Kannapolis, North Carolina. It encompasses parts of Cabarrus and Rowan Counties, yet operates independently of both county-wide school systems. This is a legacy of the fact that Kannapolis was originally a company town for Cannon Mills (Kannapolis was not incorporated as a city until 1984).

== Schools ==
=== Grades K-12 ===
- Grades K-5: G.W. Carver Elementary School (founded 2017), building was previously used for Kannapolis Middle School and Kannapolis Intermediate School)
- Grades 6-8: Kannapolis Middle School (Eagles; kelly green and navy blue) (founded 1981, moved to current facility in 2005)
- Grades 9-12: A.L. Brown High School (Wonders; kelly green and white) (founded 1924 as J. W. Cannon High School, renamed and moved to current facility in 1952)

Elementary Schools

- Forest Park Elementary
- Shady Brook Elementary
- Jackson Park Elementary
- Fred L. Wilson Elementary
- North Kannapolis Elementary (formerly Woodrow Wilson)
- G.W. Carver Elementary School

== New policies (2017) ==
In 2017–2018 school year, Kannapolis opened a new part of the middle school. Now the upper building houses 6th grade and the lower building houses 7th and 8th. The elementary schools now house k-5 again. The former intermediate school has been renamed George Washington Carver, and is an Arts magnet elementary school.

== See also ==
- Cabarrus County Schools
- Rowan-Salisbury School System
- List of school districts in North Carolina
