= Bost Mill Historic District =

Historic district in North Carolina, United States

- U.S. National Register of Historic Places
- U.S. Historic district
- Location within North Carolina Location within the United States
- Location: N and S sides of NC 200 off US 601, near Georgeville, North Carolina
- Coordinates: 35°19′32″N 80°30′08″W
- Area: 265 acres (107 ha)
- Built: 1870
- Architectural style: Gothic
- NRHP reference No.: 86000076
- Added to NRHP: January 13, 1986

Bost Mill Historic District is a national historic district located near Georgeville, Cabarrus County, North Carolina. The district encompasses 10 contributing buildings and 3 contributing sites associated with the Bost Mill grain and cotton operation. Notable buildings include the Bost Roller Mill, the John Bost House with its five outbuildings, the Bost Tenant House, the St. Paul's Methodist Church, and the Bost Cotton Gin.

It was listed on the National Register of Historic Places in 1986.
