= First Charter Bank =

- Formerly: The Concord National Bank (1888–1984); First Charter National Bank (1984–2001)
- Company type: Public company
- Traded as: Previously Nasdaq: FCTR
- Industry: Financial services
- Founded: July 5, 1888; 137 years ago
- Founder: Daniel Branson Coltrane
- Defunct: June 7, 2008; 18 years ago
- Fate: Acquired by Fifth Third Bank
- Successor: Fifth Third Bank
- Headquarters: Concord, North Carolina (1888–2001); Charlotte, North Carolina (2001–2008)
- Area served: North Carolina and Georgia
- Products: Banking services

First Charter Bank was an American bank headquartered in Charlotte, North Carolina, United States. From its 1888 founding as Concord National Bank until its 2001 move to Charlotte, the bank was headquartered in Concord, North Carolina and was a subsidiary of First Charter Corporation. The bank became part of Fifth Third Bank in 2008.

== History ==
=== Foundation ===
Textile companies in Concord, North Carolina such as Cannon Mills needed a bank, and while they had the money to start it, they needed someone to run it. Daniel Branson Coltrane, a Confederate veteran who served with J.E.B. Stuart in the Civil War, returned to North Carolina in 1888, and Concord National Bank opened in July as North Carolina's first national bank.

=== Growth ===
In 1925, Concord National Bank moved to the newly built Hotel Concord.

Bob Bratton became Chief Financial Officer of Concord National Bank in 1977, serving in that position until 2005. He played a major role in the bank's evolution as it changed its name to First Charter Bank and acquired Bank of Union, Carolina State Bank, Home Federal Savings, Carolina First BancShares, ten insurance agencies and Southeastern Employee Benefit Services.

The bank's operation center located in the former Cabarrus Theater, an art deco building built in 1939.

In 1984, Concord National Bank merged with Citizens National Bank, founded in 1905 and also in Concord. The name change to First Charter, since Concord National was the state's first chartered bank, took place at that time.

On December 1, 1998, First Charter broke ground on a $35 million operations center in the UNC Charlotte area, intended for as many as 800 employees. The headquarters, however, remained in Concord.

After buying Home Federal Savings in Charlotte, First Charter renamed that bank's seven-story building but later moved its branch across the street to the Johnston Building. The Home Savings building closed but later reopened with new owners.

In a deal valued at $260 million, on November 8, 1999, First Charter Corporation agreed to buy Carolina First BancShares of Lincolnton, North Carolina, owner of Lincoln Bank of North Carolina, Cabarrus Bank of North Carolina and Community Bank and Trust, with assets of $774 million and 31 offices.

First Charter began moving to its new $40 million University Research Park headquarters in February 2001.

In January 2006, First Charter opened three branches, its first in the North Carolina's Triangle, in former SouthTrust locations closed after that bank's purchase by Wachovia. Also, First Charter planned 24 ATMs in Food Lion grocery stores. By 2010, First Charter hoped to have 10 Triangle branches.

=== Acquired ===
On August 16, 2007, Fifth Third Bank announced its purchase of First Charter. First Charter had deposits of $3.2 billion and assets of $4.8 billion, with 60 branches, four insurance offices and 137 automated-teller machines in North Carolina and Georgia, as well as loan offices in Asheville, North Carolina, and Reston, Virginia. The $1.1 billion deal gave Fifth Third a major presence in the Southeastern United States, adding to its Georgia branches and giving it an entry into the Charlotte market and the Carolinas. The deal closed in June 2008.
