= First Congregational Church (Mount Pleasant, North Carolina) =

Historic church in North Carolina, United States

- U.S. National Register of Historic Places
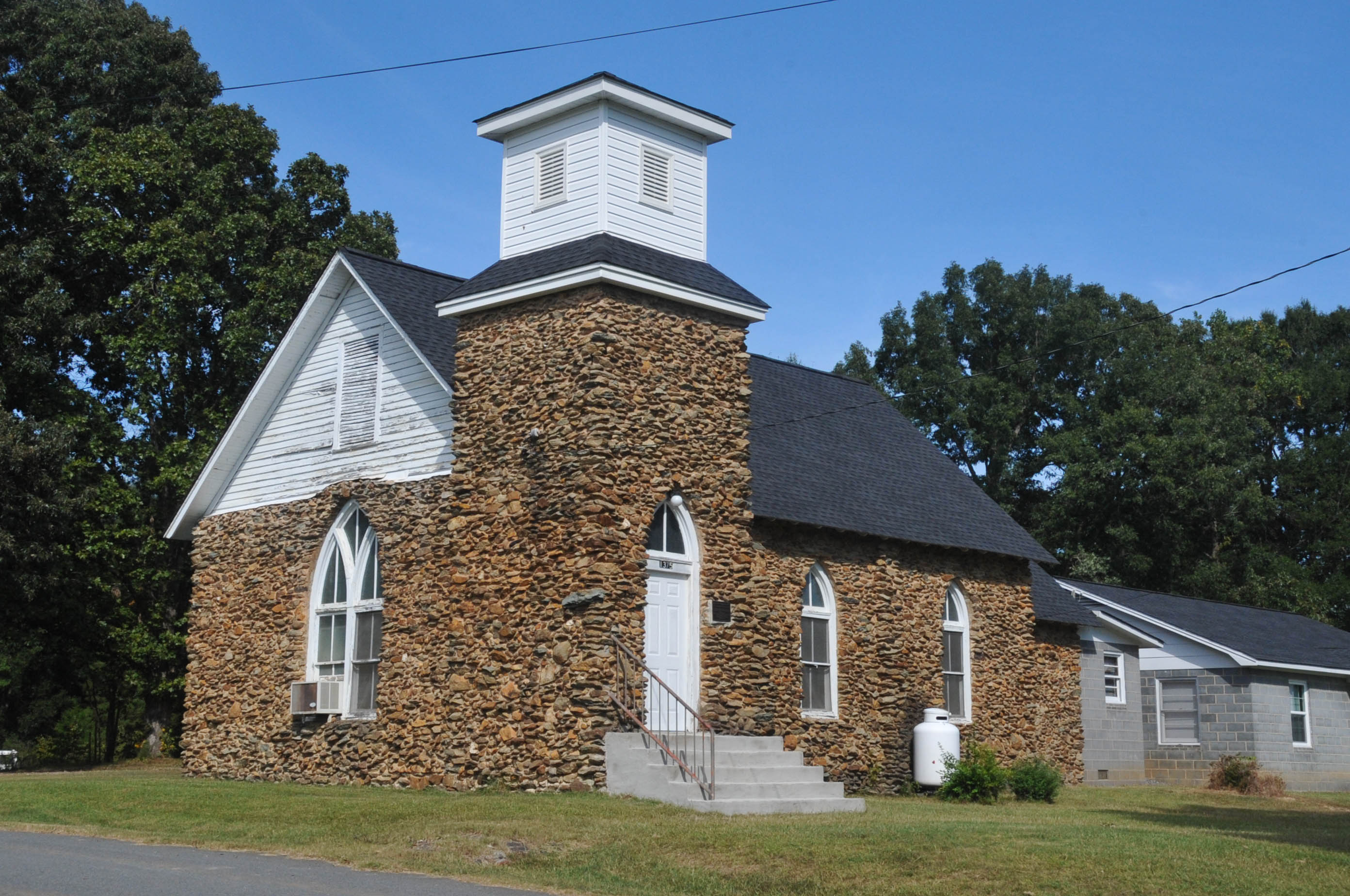

- Location within North Carolina Location within the United States
- Location: Corner of Wade and C Sts., Mount Pleasant, North Carolina
- Coordinates: 35°23′57″N 80°25′40″W
- Area: 1.3 acres (0.53 ha)
- Built: 1918–1921
- Architect: Robert Franklin Lynn, Calvin Bost
- Architectural style: Gothic Revival
- NRHP reference No.: 86000030
- Added to NRHP: January 9, 1986

First Congregational Church is a historic Congregational church located in Mount Pleasant, Cabarrus County, North Carolina. It was built between 1918 and 1921, and consists of a one-story side gable nave; a two-stage tower; a small, gabled-roof wing that is commonly referred to as the "serving room;" and two concrete additions. The church features stone sheathing and Gothic Revival style design details. The church served the African-American community of Mount Pleasant.

It was listed on the National Register of Historic Places in 1986.
