= Rev. John E. Pressley House =

Historic house in North Carolina, United States

- U.S. National Register of Historic Places
- Location within North Carolina Location within the United States
- Location: N side of SR 1613 0.3 miles E of SR 1612, near Bethpage, North Carolina
- Coordinates: 35°30′18″N 80°45′40″W
- Area: 21.3 acres (8.6 ha)
- Built: 1837-1851
- Architectural style: Greek Revival, Federal, Log construction
- NRHP reference No.: 86000029
- Added to NRHP: January 6, 1986

Rev. John E. Pressley House is a historic home located near Bethpage, Cabarrus County, North Carolina. It was built between 1837 and 1851, and is a small two-story Federal and Greek Revival style log house. It served as the manse for the Coddle Creek and the New Perth Associate Reformed Presbyterian Churches between 1850 and 1900.

It was listed on the National Register of Historic Places in 1986.
