= Spears House (Concord, North Carolina) =

Historic house in North Carolina, United States

- U.S. National Register of Historic Places
- U.S. Historic district
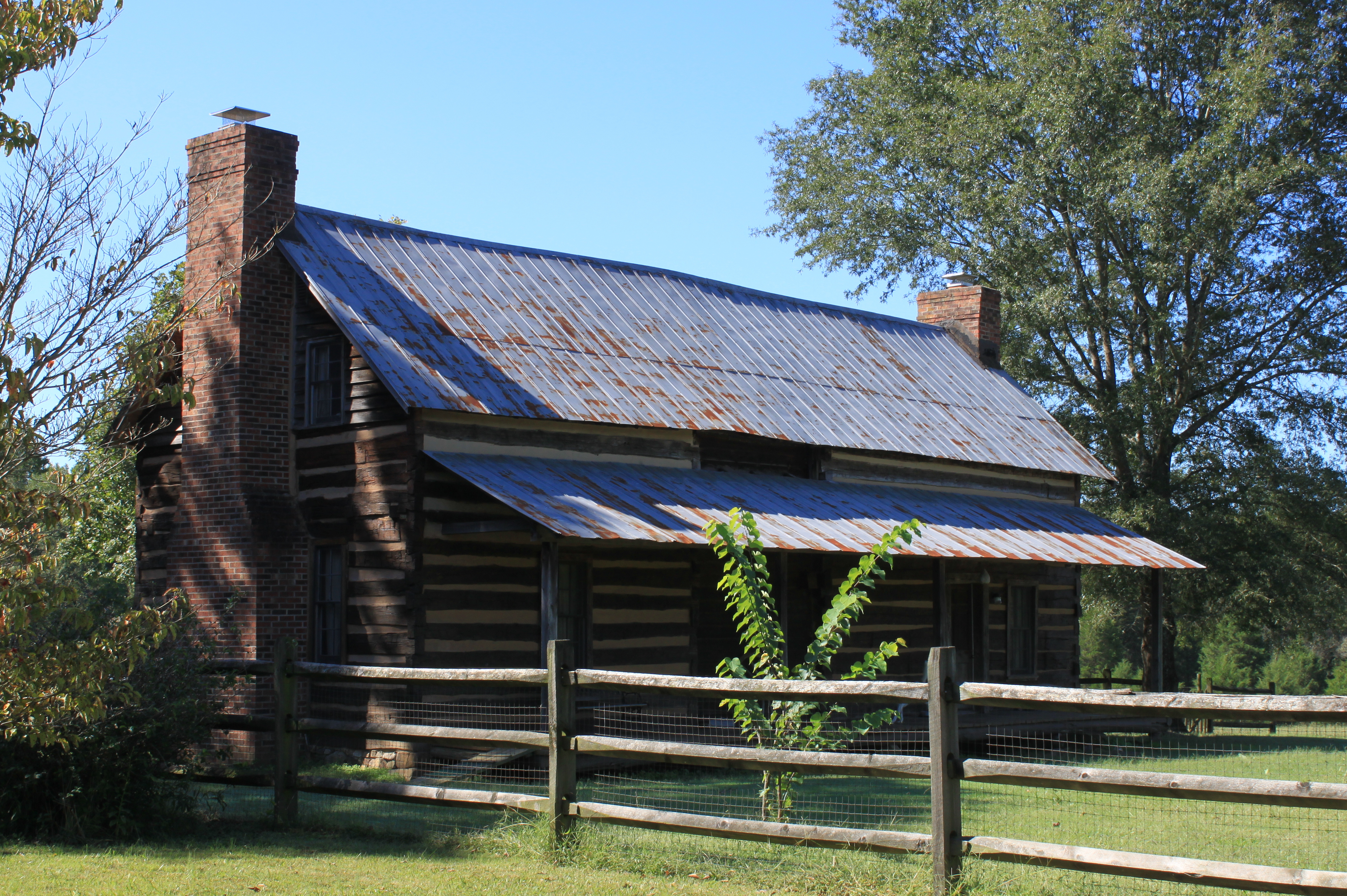

- Location within North Carolina Location within the United States
- Location: 1615 Morrison Rd., near Concord, North Carolina
- Coordinates: 35°15′14″N 80°36′10″W
- Area: 38.5 acres (15.6 ha)
- Architectural style: Half-dovetail log dogtrot
- NRHP reference No.: 89001046
- Added to NRHP: August 7, 1989

Spears House, also known as Caldwell Creek Farm and Eudy Farm, is a historic home and national historic district located near Concord, Cabarrus County, North Carolina. The farmhouse was constructed in stages and, prior to 1825, reached the form of a dogtrot. The original pen was probably built sometime between about 1760 and 1795 and the second pen was probably built between 1796 and 1800. The house was restored from 1982 to 1987.

It was listed on the National Register of Historic Places in 1989.
