= Lentz Hotel =

Building in North Carolina, USA

- U.S. National Register of Historic Places
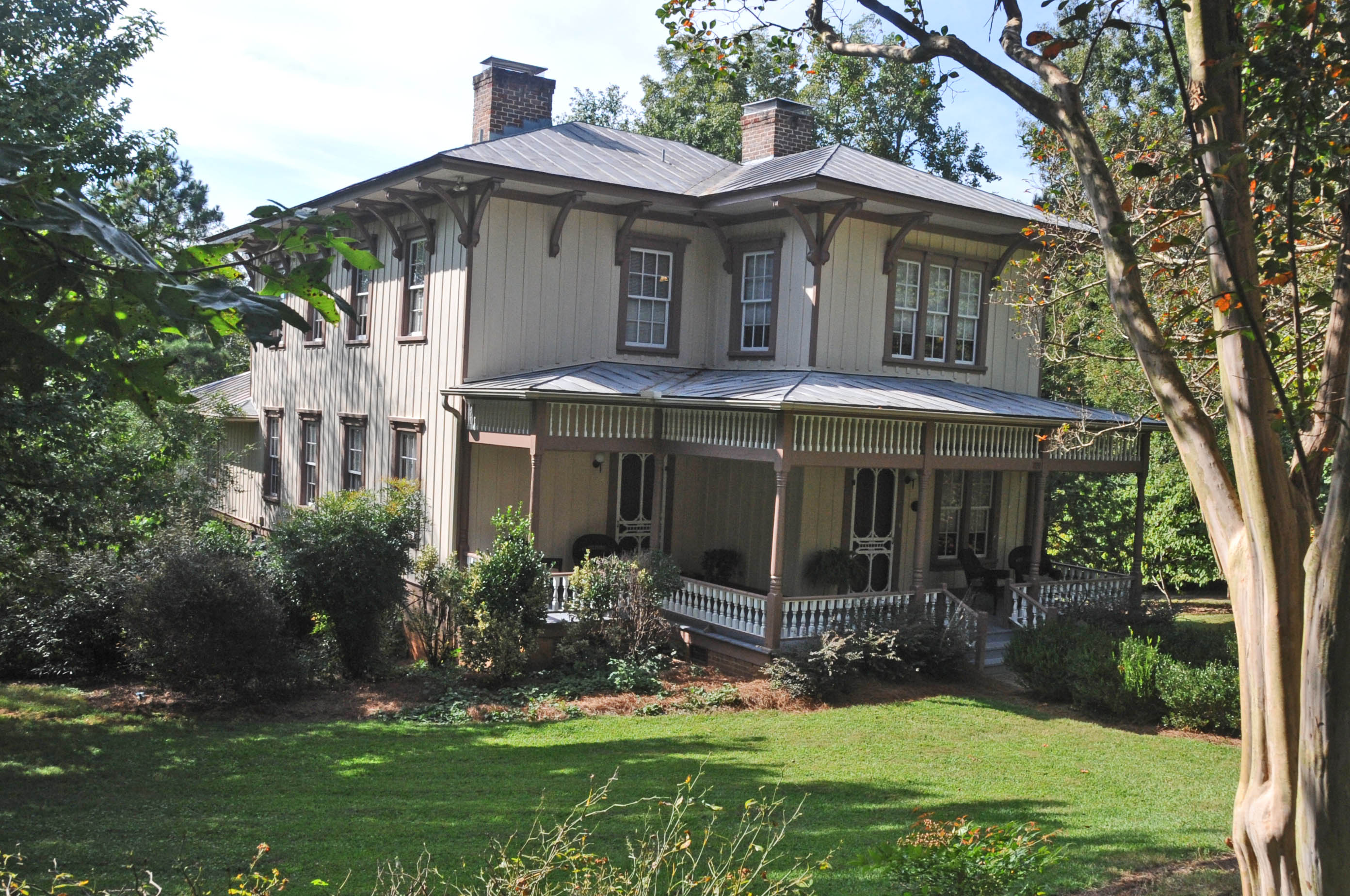
- Lentz Hotel, March 2007

- Location within North Carolina Location within the United States
- Location: College St., Mount Pleasant, North Carolina
- Coordinates: 35°24′10″N 80°26′14″W
- Area: 0.5 acres (0.20 ha)
- Built: c. 1853
- Architectural style: Gothic Revival, Bracketed Mode
- NRHP reference No.: 82003438
- Added to NRHP: June 14, 1982

The Lentz Hotel, erected in 1853, is an historic site that is the oldest commercial building in Cabarrus County, North Carolina. It was moved in 1980 from its original site at the center of Mount Pleasant, North Carolina and restored.

== Description ==
The board-and-batten exterior of the Lentz Hotel is supported by a timber frame of chestnut. The building reflects the "bracketed mode" of construction, made popular by American architect Andrew Jackson Downing (1815–1852). This "Carpenter Gothic" style includes brackets under especially wide eaves, vertical board-and-batten sheathing, and heavy lintels over the windows. The seven mantels and the staircase are of the Greek Revival tradition. The exterior siding is cypress, interior walls are pine, and the floors are made of heart pine planks.

== History ==
Built by W. R. Scott in 1853, he sold the property (then known as the Mt. Pleasant Hotel) to John Lentz in 1863 for $1,350 in Confederate currency. The Lentz family operated the hotel for over 60 years, spanning three generations. In 1911, the Lentzes built an outside set of stairs so the upstairs rooms could be used by the female students of Mont Ameona Seminary after the school burned (it was considered unseemly for girls to walk through the downstairs rooms where men could be present).

The Lentz Hotel was the social center of Mt. Pleasant during the last quarter of the nineteenth century and the first part of the twentieth century. In fact, it was "famous for parties and social events". Much of the hotel's prosperity came from the town's dual role as a trading and educational center. In 1926, the Lentz family sold the hotel.

Over the 20th century, the hotel changed hands several times. Used as a rental property, the Lentz hotel deteriorated. In 1980, the current owners made plans to demolish the hotel and build a new building. However, the Mt. Pleasant Insurance Company and local preservationists started exploring other options. With funding from the Historic Preservation Fund of North Carolina and the Daniel J. Stowe Foundation, the Lentz Hotel was moved to its current location on College Street in Mount Pleasant.

After being moved, the Lentz Hotel was completely restored. It is listed on the National Register of Historic Places in 1984.
