= North Union Street Historic District =

Historic district in North Carolina, United States

- U.S. National Register of Historic Places
- U.S. Historic district
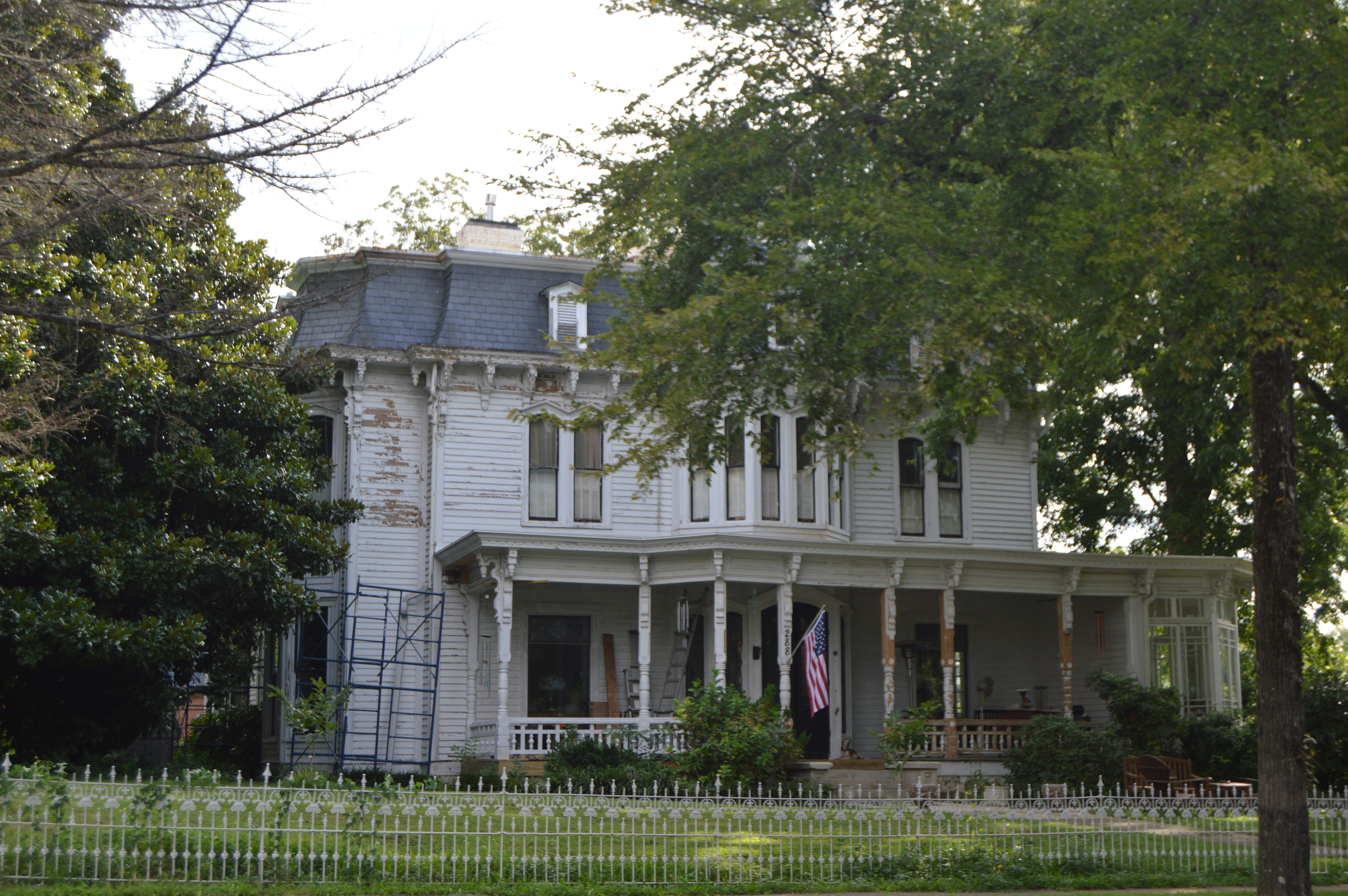
- 288 N. Union

- Location within North Carolina Location within the United States
- Location: Roughly bounded by Peachtree Ave. NW, Church St. N, Cobran Ave. SW, and Georgia St. NW and Spring St. N, Concord, North Carolina
- Coordinates: 35°24′46″N 80°35′13″W
- Area: 131.4 acres (53.2 ha)
- Built: c. 1870
- Built by: Asbury, Louis H.; Et al.
- Architectural style: Greek Revival, Late 19th And 20th Century Revivals, Late Victorian
- NRHP reference No.: 86000789
- Added to NRHP: April 15, 1986

North Union Street Historic District is a national historic district located at Concord, Cabarrus County, North Carolina. The district encompasses 150 contributing buildings in a predominantly residential section of Concord. The area developed after 1870 and includes notable examples of Greek Revival and Late Victorian style architecture. Located in the district are the First Presbyterian Church, the Associate Reformed Presbyterian Church, Forest Hill Methodist Church, the First Baptist Church, the (Former) All Saints Episcopal Church, and the First United Presbyterian Church.

It was listed on the National Register of Historic Places in 1986.
