= Ruth Coltrane Cannon =

American preservationist (1891–1965)

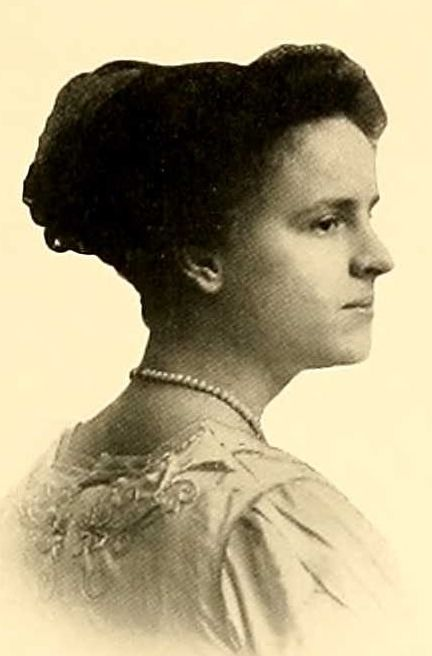
- Ruth Coltrane Cannon c. 1911
- Born: October 15, 1891; Concord, North Carolina, US
- Died: December 22, 1965 (aged 74); Concord, North Carolina, US
- Occupations: Preservationist, Philanthropist
- Spouses: Charles Albert Cannon
- Children: Charles Albert Cannon Jr. Mariam Cannon Hayes; Mary Ruth Cannon Spencer; William Coltrane Cannon

Ruth Louise Coltrane Cannon (October 15, 1891 – December 22, 1965) was an American preservationist, historian, and philanthropist. Known for her influential contributions to historical preservation in North Carolina, she played a significant role in restoring landmarks, promoting the arts, and supporting educational initiatives.

== Early life and education ==
Ruth Louise Coltrane was born on October 15, 1891, in Concord, North Carolina. Her father, a Civil War veteran, founded the Concord National Bank, North Carolina's oldest national bank. She graduated summa cum laude from Greensboro College in 1911 with a degree in history, marking the beginning of a lifelong passion for the subject.

== Marriage and family ==
On June 5, 1912, Ruth married Charles Albert Cannon, the president and chairman of Cannon Mills Company, a textile empire founded by his father, James W. Cannon. Together, they raised four children, including Charles Albert Cannon Jr., who died during World War II while piloting a plane over Burma. Ruth and Charles shared a strong commitment to community service and philanthropy.

== Contributions to historical preservation ==
Ruth Cannon was a co-founder of the North Carolina Society for the Preservation of Antiquities (now Preservation North Carolina) in 1939. She was also its president from 1945 to 1956. She played a pivotal role in the restoration of several historic sites, including North Carolina's first Governor's mansion: Tryon Palace in New Bern, the historic town of Bath, the Elizabethan Gardens in Manteo, and Concord's history museum, Memorial Hall. She was an original member of the Tryon Palace Commission and served for twenty years.

As a member of the North Carolina Garden Club, Ruth chaired the book committee that produced Old Homes and Gardens of North Carolina, a seminal publication in the state's preservation movement. She carried out unique fund-raising projects through the garden club, an example: For $1 donors could sign her hand-decorated donor's book to support the Tryon Palace restoration. The combined proceeds from Cannon's garden club donor book came up with the $9,000 needed to purchase the palace's impressive wrought-iron gates.

She also established the Ruth Coltrane Cannon award in 1948 to recognize excellence in historical research, preservation, and restoration.

== Advocacy and leadership ==
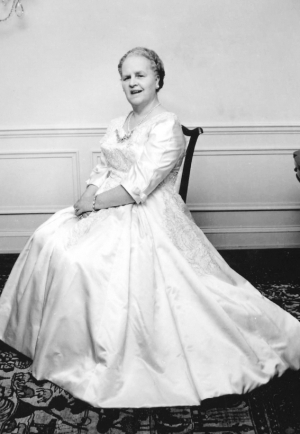

Ruth Cannon was a recognized authority on Cabarrus County history, particularly its colonial and Confederate periods. She held leadership roles in numerous historical and patriotic organizations, including:

- Chairman of the Roanoke Island Historical Association
- The National Society of the Colonial Dames of America (Chairman of the Cabarrus Committee)
- The Daughters of the American Revolution
- The Daughters of the American Colonists
- The North Carolina Society of Descendants of the Pilgrims
- The Daughters of 1812
- The Daughters of Colonial Wars
- The United Daughters of the Confederacy

Locally, she restored the Stirewalt-built house in west Kannapolis, known as "For Pity’s Sake," which became a venue for community and civic events.

== Philanthropy and community engagement ==
During World War II, Ruth co-founded the Cabarrus Red Cross and served on the Concord School Board. She helped organize the women's auxiliary for Cabarrus Memorial Hospital and contributed to the creation of the Charles A. Cannon Jr. Memorial Hospital in Banner Elk.

Ruth's advocacy extended to education and the arts. She was instrumental in establishing the music department at A.L. Brown High School, which was later named in her honor. She also supported the formation of the Cannon Music Camp at Appalachian State University and contributed to various educational institutions, including Wingate College and Lees-McRae College.

== Legacy ==
Ruth Cannon's impact on historic preservation, community development, and philanthropy was profound. Several institutions and programs continue to honor her contributions, including:

- The Ruth Coltrane Cannon Award, North Carolina's most prestigious preservation award, is presented to an individual or organization that has made contributions of statewide significance to historic preservation in North Carolina.
- A dormitory at Wingate College and a residence hall at Appalachian State University named for Ruth and Charles Cannon
- The Cannon Music Camp and music building at A.L. Brown High School
