= D.H. Griffin Companies =

US conglomerate specialized in demolition

- Type: Privately held conglomerate
- Industry: Demolition, Demolition Contractors, Industrial demolition, Commercial Demolition, Environmental Remediation, Industrial Contracting, Emergency Response, Demolition Experts
- Founded: Greensboro, NC 1959
- Founder: D.H. Griffin
- Headquarters: Greensboro, NC, US
- Website: www.dhgriffin.com

D.H. Griffin Companies is a group of nine independently owned but integrated companies that perform contract demolition as well as environmental and site development services. It was founded in 1959 and is headquartered in Greensboro, North Carolina. They were the largest contractor responsible for cleaning up the World Trade Center after the September 11 attacks. The current president is David Griffin Jr.

== History ==
David H. Griffin, Sr.and Clifton D. Fields started demolition work in 1959 when he coordinated the demolition of an old church building. He used some of the salvaged parts to help construct his family's first house.

== Independent subsidiaries ==
=== D.H. Griffin Wrecking Co., Inc. ===
The D.H. Griffin Wrecking Co., Inc., is the primary business of the D.H. Griffin family of companies. It was incorporated in 1967. The company provides demolition services for commercial, governmental and industrial structures, including explosive demolition and emergency demolition. By 2008, it had become the second-largest demolition firm in the country, and in the top 150 Top Specialty Contractors. In 2012, it ranked fifth worldwide in total revenue for demolition companies in the Demolition and Recycling International magazine's D&Ri100.

=== D.H. Griffin of Texas, Inc. ===
This company performs industrial demolition, total and partial plant demolition and dismantling, mine closure, explosives demolition of various structures, as well as the dismantling and demolition of bridges. They also handle the removal of hazardous and toxic chemicals from these structures. They were featured on Discovery television program The Detonators

=== D.H. Griffin Construction ===
Formed in 1995, they build large structures such as bridges, prisons and schools. They have offices in the North Carolina cities of Greensboro, and Raleigh.

=== D.H. Griffin Contracting ===
Formerly the Taft Contracting Company, one of the largest equipment installation specialists in the US, this division is responsible for moving heavy machinery, dismantling and relocating manufacturing plants, as well as hauling and warehousing of industrial equipment.

=== Griffin Services ===
Griffin Services is a specialized contractor focused on environmental remediation and related services. The company is a certified woman-owned business enterprise (WBENC).

=== Griffin Forensic Services ===
Griffin Forensic Services provides secure forensic storage and evidence preservation for materials recovered from incident sites. Their services support investigations, insurance review, and legal proceedings where documentation, traceability, and chain-of-custody are critical.

=== Griffin Industrial Contracting Company ===
Griffin Industrial Contracting Company (GICC) is a mechanical contracting and millwright services firm operating within the advanced manufacturing, automotive, aerospace, and amusement industries. The company is a certified woman-owned business enterprise and is union staffed.

=== Demolition & Asbestos Removal, Inc. (DARI) ===
Owned by the Griffin family, this division handles the demolition of buildings that contain hazardous materials such as asbestos, as well as the final disposal of hazardous materials from these buildings.

=== DARI Disaster Mitigation & Restoration Division ===
This division of the environmental affiliate of DH Griffin, DARI, supplements the existing asbestos & demolition services offered with providing disaster mitigation and restoration in response to residential and commercial structural damage cause by water, fire, mold, storm, and other types of damages.

== Notable work ==
=== Stadiums ===
D.H. Griffin Companies has developed a good reputation in demolishing full-size stadiums. In the mid-1990s, the D.H. Griffin Companies were hired to demolish the old Atlanta–Fulton County Stadium. They were also contracted to construct the parking lot for the new Turner Field. In 2002, the old Riverfront Stadium in Cincinnati, Ohio was demolished in what Implosionworld.com, regarding liability, called "the most difficult stadium blast ever attempted."

=== Disaster cleanup ===
D.H. Griffin began work cleaning up after the 9/11 World Trade Center bombing on September 13, 2001, just two days after the event. After Hurricane Katrina, D.H. Griffin was involved with a number of demolition projects, including wholesale destruction of existing casinos to make way for new casino construction.

=== Pillowtex complex ===
Beginning in 2006, while making way for the North Carolina Research Campus in Kannapolis, North Carolina, D.H. Griffin Wrecking Co. was hired to demolish the Pillowtex Corporation industrial complex at the former Cannon Mills site. The demolition work of the six million-square-foot site is considered "the largest commercial effort of its kind conducted on the planet."
