= DNI =

DNI may stand for:

== Government and military ==
- Digital Network Intelligence, the NSA term for the collection of data from the Internet
- Director of National Intelligence, a Cabinet-level executive position that oversees the United States Intelligence Community
- Director of Naval Intelligence (disambiguation)
- Documento Nacional de Identidad (disambiguation) or "National Identity Document" or "National identity card" in Spanish

== Science and technology ==
- Direct neural interface, a brain-computer interface
- Direct normal irradiance, a measure of the solar irradiance striking a surface held normal to the line of sight to the sun
- Direct normal insolation, also known as direct insolation, a measure of the solar irradiance striking a surface held normal to line of sight to the sun
- Dole Nutrition Institute founded by the Dole Food Company
- Do not intubate, an alternate term for "do not resuscitate"
- Do not install, a term sometimes used in printed circuit board design to denote the omitting of a component

== Other uses ==
- Lower Grand Valley Dani language (ISO 639 code: dni)
- Wad Medani Airport (IATA airport code: DNI), an airstrip in Sudan

== See also ==
- D'ni, a culture in the Myst series
- DNIS, a telephone service feature
