= James Cannon =

James Cannon may refer to:

- James P. Cannon (1890–1974), American Communist and (later) Trotskyist leader
- James Cannon (mathematician) (1740–1782), Scottish-born mathematician who was one of the principal authors of Pennsylvania's 1776 Constitution
- James Cannon Jr. (1864–1944), American temperance leader
- James Cannon (rugby union) (born 1988), English rugby union player
- Jim Cannon (footballer, born 1953), Scottish football centre half who played for the English club Crystal Palace
- Jim Cannon (footballer, born 1927) (1927–1991), Scottish football inside forward who played for Dunfermline, St Johnstone, Albion Rovers and Darlington
- Jimmy Cannon (1909–1973), American sports writer
- James M. Cannon (1918–2011), American journalist and political adviser to President Gerald Ford
- James H. Cannon, founder of the Cannon Electric Company
- James W. Cannon (born 1943), American mathematician working in geometric group theory and low-dimensional topology
- James William Cannon (1852–1921), American industrialist
  - SS James W. Cannon, a Liberty ship
- D. James Cannon (1919–1998), member of the Utah House of Representatives
- James E. Cannon (1873–1942), American politician in the Virginia Senate
- Jim Cannon (curler), Scottish curler
