= Cannon High School =

High school in North Carolina, United States

Coordinates: 35.4977°N 80.6187°W

Cannon High School was a Kannapolis, North Carolina high school that existed from 1924 to 1951. Originally known as Central High School, it was renamed J.W. Cannon High School in 1930. In 1933, it burned down, and was rebuilt in 1934. A.L. Brown High School was constructed 50 yards southeast of Cannon High School in 1950–1951, and Cannon High School became J.W. Cannon Junior High School.

One notable person who attended Cannon High School was Major League Baseball player Dixie Upright.
