= A.L. Brown High School =

American public school in North Carolina

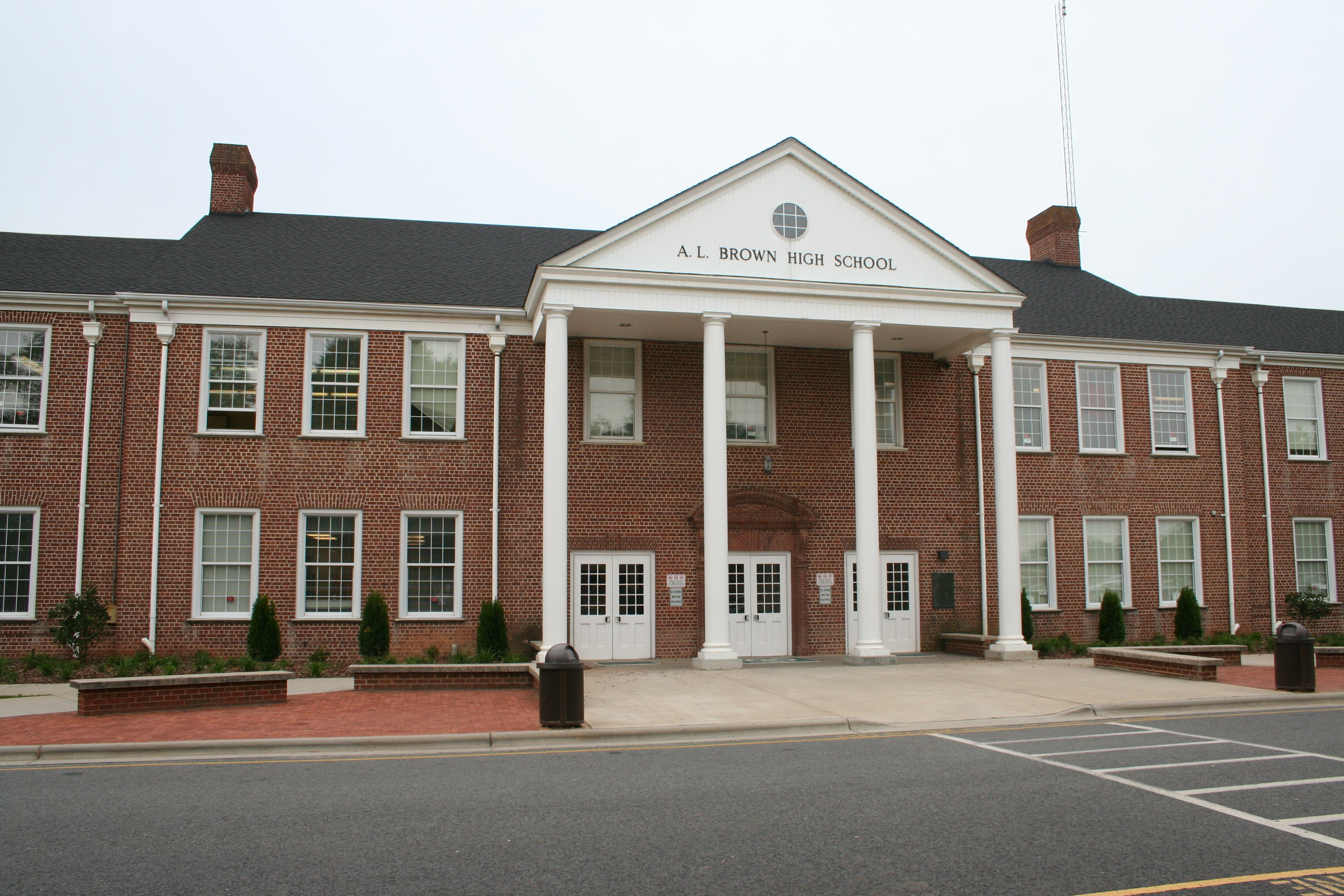

Location
- 415 Martin Luther King Jr. Ave. Kannapolis, North Carolina 28083; United States; 35°29′47″N 80°37′09″W

Information
- Type: Public
- Established: 1924 (102 years ago)
- School district: Kannapolis City Schools
- CEEB code: 341985
- Principal: Sarah Newell
- Teaching staff: 92.66 (FTE)
- Grades: 9–12
- Enrollment: 1,776 (2023–2024)
- Student to teacher ratio: 19.17
- Campus type: Suburban
- Colors: Kelly green and white
- Nickname: Wonders
- Rival: Concord High School
- Website: kcs.k12.nc.us/alb

A.L. (Alfred Luther) Brown High School is a comprehensive public high school in Kannapolis, North Carolina. It is the only high school in the Kannapolis City Schools district as well as the city of Kannapolis.

A.L. Brown was recognized by DPI as a "School of Distinction" under the state's ABC standards for public education for the 2003–2010 school years.

== History ==
During the expansion of the Cannon Mills Corporation during the 1920s, James William Cannon donated a piece of land just east of the town for a school. Central High School would be built in 1924, about the same time, a new Concord High School opened. Later in 1930, Central High School was renamed J. W. Cannon High School, in honor of James William Cannon. In 1933, the school burned down, and was rebuilt in 1934.

In 1952, the school was renamed A.L. Brown High School, after Alfred Luther Brown (1876–1955), a textile business executive. The school moved to a new building southeast of the old facility. The former building was converted into a junior high school, under the name Cannon Junior High School.

In 1967, George Washington Carver High School, Kannapolis' former high school for African Americans, merged with the then all-white A.L. Brown High School, as a result of school integration.

Over the course of the schools history, many additions have been built on to A. L. Brown, such as a separate vocational building, as well as a free-standing gymnasium. During the 2006–07 school year, a newer gymnasium facility opened on campus. These free-standing buildings give A. L. Brown its unique character. Instead of a traditional single building like most high schools, Brown has a small, college-like atmosphere with numerous buildings around a central courtyard. All buildings on the campus are built in the Colonial Williamsburg style of architecture. They also are brick with white trim, modeled after most of Kannapolis.

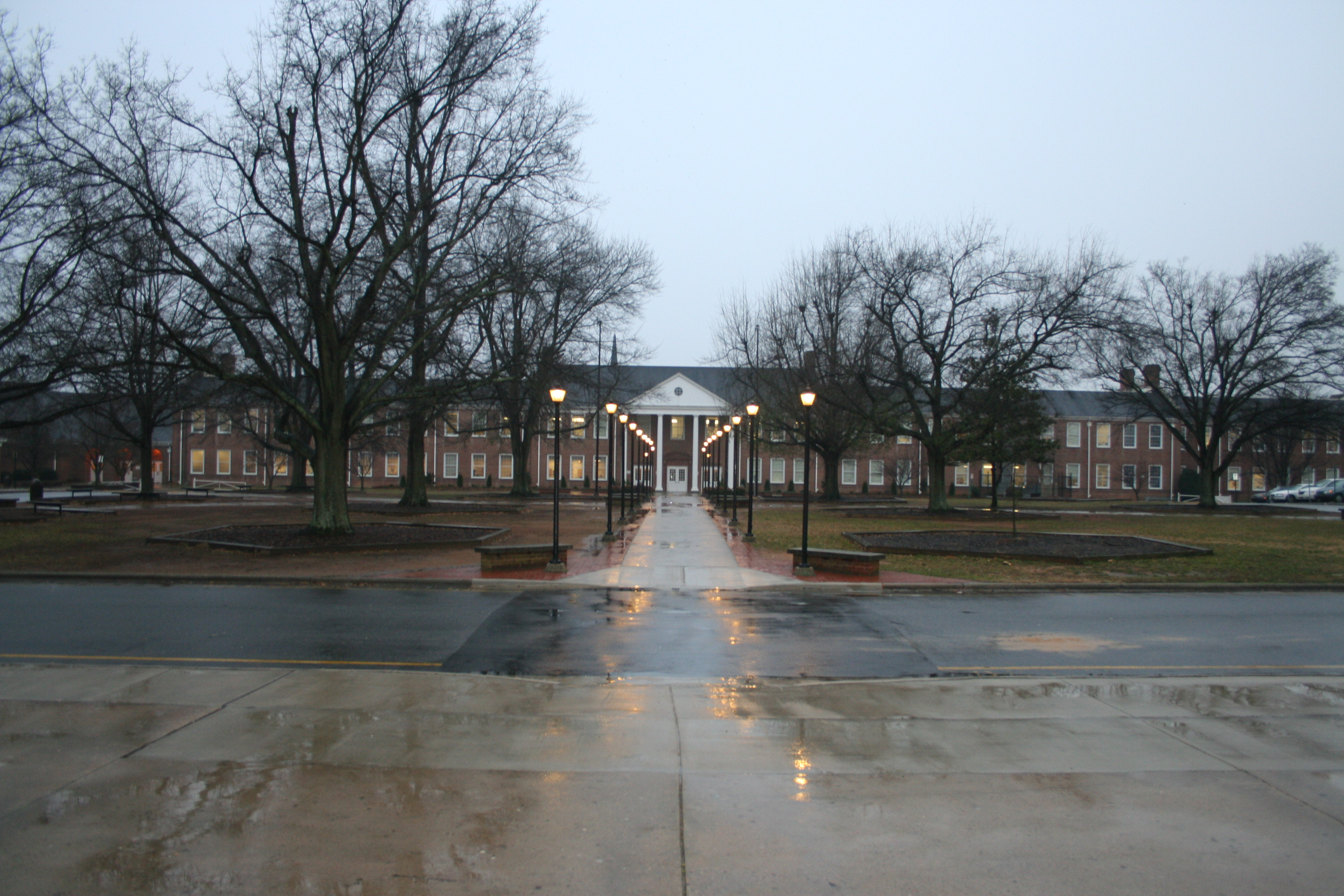
A. L. Brown High School in February 2006

On September 25, 2011, the STEM Academy, designed to resemble the nearby North Carolina Research Campus Core Lab, held its grand opening. The top two floors offer modern science labs, while the second floor will house communication classes. The basement has a health center and an international welcome center.

In March 2012, the Stroup Arts Center opened. This replaced the previous Vocational Building or V-Building. This center also provides an Exceptional Children's Department, Dance Studio, Art Studio, Drafting, Culinary Arts, Foods 1 & 2, Theatre, & ROTC to the students of A. L. Brown High School.

In October 2025, there was a plan to tear down Cannon Gym and replace it, and renovate another building on the campus.

== Timeline ==
- 1924 – Central High School Opens
- 1930 – Renamed J.W. Cannon High School
- 1933 – J.W. Cannon High School burns down because of faulty wiring
- 1934 – Cannon HS is rebuilt
- 1950–51 – A.L. Brown High School is constructed 50 yd southeast of Cannon High. Cannon High becomes J. W. Cannon Junior High School.
- 1957 – An 8-classroom science wing is added to the west end of the main building.
- 1958 – The W.J. Bullock Physical Education Building is constructed. Kannapolis Memorial Stadium is built and the central courtyard is added.
- 1967 – The Samuel B. Stroup Vocational Arts Building, The Ruth Coltrane Cannon Musical Education Center and the Administrative Annex is constructed (Now the Central Office)
- 1967 — A.L. Brown and George Washington Carver High School integrate
- April 17, 1974 – Roof Burns; graduation is moved to W. J. Bullock Gymnasium
- 1976 – The W.J. Bullock Physical Education Building is extensively renovated under the supervision of Coach Bob Boswell.
- January 10, 1982 – J.W. Cannon Junior High School burns down. (Fire was caused by accident). Gymnasium, Cafeteria and Home Economics buildings remain.
- 1991 – Media Center Wing is constructed
- 1993 – Cafeteria Addition is built
- 1994 – Main Office Renovated
- 1995 – Music building roof pitched, W.J. Bullock Gym roof replaced
- 1995 – An 8-classroom science wing is added to the existing science wing
- 1997 – Cyber Campus comes online
- 2003 – Science wing basement is renovated. Becomes the Mathematics wing
- 2005 – Cannon Cafeteria and Home Economics Building are demolished
- 2006 – Auxiliary Physical Education Building is constructed and the Auditorium is extensively renovated. An addition is built for the Central Office and the Main Office is renovated
- 2007 – The Freshman Academy is established
- 2009 – The Biotech Wing (later called STEM Academy) construction begins
- 2011 – STEM Academy completed, V-Building renovation begins
- 2012 – Vocational Building (V-Building) later called Arts Building is renovated

== Notable alumni ==
- Aundrae Allison — former NFL wide receiver
- Tavis Bailey — Olympic discus thrower at the 2016 Summer Olympics
- Ethan Horton — former NFL tight end and Pro Bowl selection in 1991
- Tracy Johnson — former NFL running back
- Kameron Marlowe — country music singer-songwriter signed to Sony Music Nashville
- Melissa Morrison-Howard — two-time Olympic bronze medalist in the 100 meter hurdles at the 2000 and 2004 Summer Olympics
- Mike Morton — former NFL linebacker and Super Bowl XXXIV champion with the Saint Louis Rams
- Brandon Parker — current NFL offensive tackle
- George Shinn — past owner of the Charlotte Hornets
- Lance Smith — former NFL offensive guard
- Haskel Stanback — former NFL running back
