= Margaret McConnell Holt =

American artist

Margaret McConnell Holt (1908-1987) was an American artist.

Holt was a 1930 graduate of the North Carolina College for Women (now the University of North Carolina at Greensboro, or UNCG), and she went on to endow a scholarship fund for the UNCG School of Music and to receive an alumni award for her ongoing support of the university.

Her father, D. E. McConnell, originated Gastonia, North Carolina's first lending library in his dental office around 1900. Seventy years later, Holt and her husband, Donnel Shaw Holt, president and CEO of Cannon Mills, donated a collection of original art by North Carolina artists to the Gaston County Public Library in memory of her father. She compiled the research on the Chinqua Penn Plantation and was a well-respected artist, who was included in the thirteenth through seventeenth editions of Who's Who in American Art.
