= Concord High School (North Carolina) =

American public school in North Carolina

Location
- 481 Burrage Road; Concord, North Carolina 28025; United States; 35°26′00″N 80°34′56″W

Information
- Type: Public
- Established: 1895 (131 years ago)
- School district: Cabarrus County Schools
- CEEB code: 340880
- NCES School ID: 370053000378
- Principal: Jeremy Hachen
- Teaching staff: 63.46 (on an FTE basis)
- Grades: 9–12
- Enrollment: 1,003 (2023-2024)
- Student to teacher ratio: 15.81
- Colors: Gold and black
- Nickname: Spiders
- Rival: A. L. Brown High School
- Website: chs.cabarrus.k12.nc.us

Concord High School is a public high school in Concord, North Carolina, United States. First opened on September 2, 1895 (one session held in fall 1893), it is the oldest public high school in Cabarrus County and one of the oldest extant in North Carolina. It became part of Cabarrus County Schools in 1983 when Concord City Schools merged with the county school system. It is also a half-regular high school and half IB high school.

== History ==
The Concord City Schools were created on May 2, 1891, upon passage of a citywide voter referendum. The system began with a single school building, the Concord Graded School (a pre-existing private academy purchased for public school use), which first opened in December 1891. In September 1893, Concord High School was founded under the guidance of a professor from Salisbury, NC. It is not clear whether this first high school term was completed. But on September 2, 1895, with classes held in the "old Lutheran Church' on East Corban Street in downtown Concord, Concord High School opened for good. The first Concord High School principal was Holland Thompson from 1895 to 1899.

Concord High School would continue in the old Lutheran Church building on East Corban Avenue through at least the 1902–03 school year. As the schools and community grew, so did the need for new facilities. A new voter referendum for school buildings was approved in 1902, and three new schools (Central Graded School. Number 2 School, and Concord Colored School) were built. Central Graded School was by far the largest of these schools, which opened on November 28, 1902, at the corner of North Spring Street and Grove Avenue. From 1903–1915 Concord High School appears to have been relocated to the Central Graded School campus, which housed all grades and was located at the present site of Coltrane-Webb Elementary School on North Spring Street. A picture of the 1914 Concord High School graduating class of 29 students may be found in the 1988 book, The Heritage of Cabarrus County. The picture was likely taken at the Central School.

In 1913, Concord voters approved another referendum for school facilities, including a separate high school building. The Board of Education immediately received a gift of the old Lutheran church property on East Corban Street. On June 8, 1914, the board agreed to build a new high school with six classrooms and an auditorium on this site (later to become Clara Harris Elementary School). This Concord High School was completed in April 1915 and it would serve as Concord High from 1915 to 1924. In 1922, a new larger high school was proposed, and city voters again approved bonds, this time in the amount of $225,000, for a new high school. This school was to be "a showcase of education for the city," located on Beech and Cedar Streets just north of downtown. The ornate, three-story brick building was completed in 1924, including a large auditorium, and adjoining playing fields.

Although part of the school was destroyed by fire in 1937, it was rebuilt and included a larger, grander auditorium, later named Sauvain Auditorium. Sauvain Auditorium was the focus of many shows and performances and was widely heralded for its beauty and acoustics. This facility would remain Concord High School for 43 years until the CCS Board of Education selected and built a new school in northeast Concord. The existing building became Concord Junior High in 1967 (renamed Concord Middle School 1976–1999) when it was replaced by a new school on NC 73 east of Concord. The 1924 school building is now the Glenn Alternative Center for the Cabarrus County Schools and is on the National Register of Historic Places.

Concord High School moved to its current location, situated on a wooded hilltop on Burrage Road in northeast Concord, in August 1967. The new school, which opened as Concord Senior High School (grades 10–12), featured a two-story modern 1960s layout and design to maximize circulation and HVAC efficiency. However, the design was such that the school appeared to have no "front," a quirk that was resolved during a renovation in the late 1990s. In 1974, the Concord City Schools moved to the 5–3–4 school grade model, and the school was again known as Concord High School, with grades 9–12.

In the 1968–69 school year, the Concord City Schools integrated high schools (other grades integrated in 1969–70). Concord High became the sole public high school in the district as students from Logan High School, the historic African-American school, were transferred to Concord High.

Located in a natural bowl alongside the school is the athletic stadium, which was dedicated as Robert C. Bailey Memorial Stadium in 1977, named for the longtime team physician, the late Dr. Robert C. Bailey. The stadium opened for play in 1967, with the first game played against Central Cabarrus High School. Bailey Memorial Stadium is widely considered one of the more scenic stadiums among North Carolina high schools, nestled within a hardwood forest that is ablaze with color in the late fall. The horseshoe stadium features 5,000 fixed seats, most with aluminum seating, and a grassy horseshoe that can accommodate an additional 8,000 fans, for a total capacity of 13,000, a capacity that has been reached on occasion, usually in the annual "Battle of the Bell" game. Graduation was held in the Bailey Memorial Stadium each year, weather permitting, through 2002. In 2003, graduation for Concord High School, as well as all other Cabarrus County schools, was moved to the Cabarrus Arena and Events Center and has been held at the Center each year since.

Two major additions have been made to the 1967 high school building in the nearly four decades since. The school remains at this location on Burrage Road.

The enrollment at Concord High School in the 2007–08 school year is 1,194 students in grades 9–12. The Concord City Schools (CCS) continued in operation until its merger with the Cabarrus County Schools on July 1, 1983.

== Athletics ==
The first year of interscholastic sports at Concord High was the 1915–1916 school year. Concord's first football game was played on November 5, 1915, against Salisbury High at the Rowan County fairgrounds in Salisbury, and resulted in a 13–12 Concord win. Under the guidance of Coach Robert S. Haltiwanger, Concord would go on to defeat Salisbury a second time, playing at Locke Mill Park in Concord, and finish its initial gridiron campaign at 2–0. Coach Haltiwanger would later become a teacher, coach, and principal at Hanes High School in Winston-Salem, NC.

The school's athletic teams are known as the "Spiders." The nickname, unique to North Carolina high schools, was a tribute to longtime principal and CCS superintendent Dr. A.S. Webb. The athletic stadium at the 1924 Concord High School campus was named Webb Field in his honor, and Concord teams playing at Webb Field were said to be bringing opponents "into the spider's 'Webb.'" The nickname stuck—it was first found in print for the 1927 season, and Concord High athletic teams have been the "Spiders" ever since.

Webb Field was renovated and "rededicated" for the season football opener in September 1935 against Charlotte Central, which Concord won in a 49–12 rout. From 1924 to 1955, football games were usually played on Friday afternoons. Lights were installed at the stadium for the 1956–57 school year. Concord High football teams played at Webb Field through the 1966 season, until the opening of the new Burrage Road high school. Concord baseball teams continued to make Webb Field their home for another 25 years, and the facility (originally featuring a grandstand) also saw minor-league baseball for several decades with the Concord Weavers in the 1930s and 1940s. Webb Field is now on the National Register of Historic Places study list).

Concord High also has the distinction of having a unique mascot in North Carolina schools. The mascot is known as the Spider-Man. A student dresses up like the Marvel Comics superhero and performs, usually at football games. In the history of the school, there have been two mascots: One who served from 2001 to 2003, and the most recent one from 2009 to 2011. The first wore a gold costume, while the second wore a costume with the black more emphasized.

Concord High competed in the North Carolina High School Athletic Association (NCHSAA) from 1915 to 1929, and won a state football title in 1929, defeating Oxford 13–6 in one of the first 10 football games ever to be played at New Kenan Memorial Stadium at UNC-Chapel Hill.

However, shortly after winning the 1929 state football title, Concord High became a charter member of the new Western North Carolina High School Activities Association (WNCHSAA) and participated in this sports association fforthe next 47 seasons (1930–1976), when the WNCHSAA merged with the NCHSAA.

Concord won many WNCHSAA titles during the 47 seasons in this association, including the WNCHSAA football title in 1935 with an impressive 9–1–1 campaign during which the Spiders scored over 41 points on several occasions, and allowed 4 points per game, losing only 12–6 at S.C. state champion Gaffney. The 1935 Spiders defeated Newton-Conover 39–0 at Davidson College for the association title. Concord won the WCNHSAA again 12 years later in 1947, as star George "Ick" Alley and teammates were victorious in the postseason Harvest Bowl title game over Shelby 13-6.

The Western North Carolina High School Activities Association contained up to 42 schools, mainly from the mid-sized cities of the Piedmont and Blue Ridge foothills— from the mountains to the Winston-Salem area, and especially along the US 29 (now I-85) corridor between Kings Mountain and High Point, and continuing west along US 74 to Rutherfordton. The WNCHSAA schools featured some of the best high school sports in the state, with many longtime traditional sports powerhousesing their midst. Many of these schools continue to feature strong sports programs to this day, having won a large number of state titles since rejoining the NCHSAA. Since 1977, Concord High has been a 3A (AAA) member of the North Carolina High School Athletic Association and still competes in the South Piedmont Conference (SPC). The South Piedmont Conference dates back to the 1930 season and the WNCHSAA, and Concord High is the only charter member of the SPC that remains in that league, having never played in another athletic conference.

The school sponsors interscholastic football, volleyball, tennis (boys and girls), cross country (boys and girls), basketball (boys and girls), wrestling, swimming (boys and girls), baseball, softball, golf, track and field (boys and girls), and soccer (boys and girls).

Concord's football team is notable throughout North Carolina due to two recent state titles (2004 and 2006) and to its role as oone-halfof the state's longest-running high school football rivalry with A. L. Brown High School in neighboring Kannapolis. What is now known as the "Battle for the Bell" was long thought to have begun in 1931, and has been played each year since that time. However, in 2013 new historical research uncovered a previous game from 1924, which is now the first meeting of the two high schools in football. Since 1950, the victor of the game has been awarded a mounted Southern Railway train bell that is painted in the colors of both high schools. The annual football game has long been a tradition in the area and is among the state's most highly attended single high school sports events, regularly drawing crowds of 10,000-plus. In recent years, A.L. Brown won the 2010 and 2011 games, with Concord winning back-to-back games in 2012 and 2013. The 89-game series record as of the 2018 game stands at Concord 43–42–4.

The 2006–07 school year was a very special year for Concord athletics, as the Spiders won both football and men's basketball championships.

In 2006–07, the Concord's men's basketball team rolled through the season and made its second straight return to the state 3A championship game, making this back-to-back years for the Spiders. The Spiders won the 2007 3A state title game at Reynolds Coliseum in Raleigh, and brought home its very first 3A state basketball championship ever in history, defeating Kinston High School 85-79. This win secured a state championship in both basketball and football in the same academic school year, giving the Spiders the honor of being the first 3AA team to ever win both championships in the same school year.

== Principals ==
- Holland M. Thompson (1895–1899)
- Dr. A.S. Webb (1900 – 1910)
- W.J. Weddington (1913–1916)
- W.E. Futrelle (1916–1921)
- Hinton MacLeod (c. 1921 – 1928)
- A.H. Jarratt (c. 1921 – 1928)
- J.M. Tignor (c. 1921 – 1928)
- Dr. J. Eris Cassell (1928–1933, 1939–1945)
- H.F. Krause (1933–1939)
- Ralph A. Glenn (1946–1969)
- Charles E. Rimer (1969–1986)
- Alan Voigt (1986–1988)
- Elbert F. Thomas (1988–1995)
- Charles Borders (1995–1996)
- D.M. "Sonny" Pruette (1996–2003)
- Dr. Bill Kinsey (2003–2005)
- Carla Black (2005–2016)
- Mike Jolley (2016)
- Dr. Adam Auerbach (2016–present)

== Notable alumni ==
- Ty-Shon Alexander, professional basketball player
- Shane Atwell, radio personality known as "Jack Daniel"
- Smith Barrier, American sports journalist
- Leaky Black, professional basketball player
- Dee Bost, professional basketball player
- Cydney Clanton, professional golfer, LPGA tour player
- Michael Eury, writer and editor, Spirit of HLAA Award, Eisner Award winner
- Jay Graham, NFL running back and college coach
- Jimmy Hitchcock, NFL cornerback
- Nick Leverett, NFL offensive guard
- Lance Lewis, NFL wide receiver
- Hamsah Nasirildeen, NFL linebacker
- Silda Wall Spitzer, businesswoman, lawyer, and former First Lady of New York State
- Beth Troutman, former host of Right This Minute and former anchor at WCNC-TV in Charlotte
- Kenyan Weaks, professional basketball player
