= David H. Murdock =

American businessman (1923–2025)

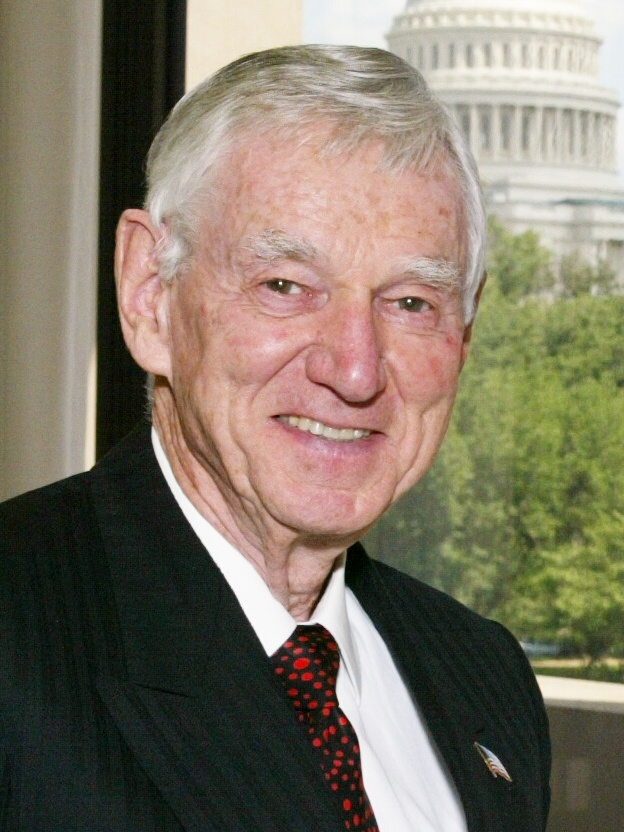
- Murdock in 2003
- Born: David Howard Murdock; April 11, 1923; Kansas City, Missouri, U.S.
- Died: June 9, 2025 (aged 102); Hidden Valley, California, U.S.
- Occupation: Chairman of Dole Food Company; Founder of the California Health and Longevity Institute (CHLI); Owner of Castle & Cooke; Owner of Pacific Clay
- Spouses: Gabriele Murdock (m. 1967; died 1985) Tracy Murdock (m. 1999)
- Children: 3

David Howard Murdock (April 11, 1923 – June 9, 2025) was an American billionaire businessman, plant-based diet advocate and philanthropist.

== Early career ==
Murdock was born on April 11, 1923, in Kansas City, Missouri. His father was a traveling salesman; his mother worked as a laundress and housekeeper to make ends meet. He was the middle child of three; he had two sisters. He was close to his mother, who died at 42 of cancer. He grew up in Montgomery Township, Ohio, and dropped out of high school in the 9th grade. He was drafted by the United States Army in 1943 during World War II.

Upon relocating to Detroit after the war, Murdock was homeless and destitute. Due to a chance encounter with a good samaritan, he obtained a $1,200 loan to buy a closing diner, flipping it for a $700 profit ten months later. He moved to Phoenix, Arizona, and began working there, first in housing and then commercial real estate.

When the real estate market collapsed in the 1960s, he moved to Los Angeles where he continued developing real estate opportunities, leading to a string of acquisitions. In 1978, he acquired control of International Mining. He became the largest shareholder in L.A.-based Occidental Petroleum, by selling the corporation his 18% share of the Iowa Beef Packers company for $800 million worth of Occidental stock in May 1981 with support from Armand Hammer: after this acquisition, Occidental, through its ownership of IBP and with support from Leonid Kostandov, became the largest United States supplier of beef to the Soviet Union.

== Businesses ==
In 1973, Murdock acquired Pacific Clay.

Via the Pacific Holding Company owned by Murdock, he purchased Cannon Mills in Kannapolis, North Carolina in 1982. At the time, the company was profitable and had no debts. He used the company's profits to pay back the loans he secured to make the acquisition before terminating 2,000 positions and selling the company-owned homes. He eliminated the company's $100 million pension plan, taking $36 million to make personal investments and using the remainder to purchase annuity policies from Executive Life Insurance Company for Cannon employees. Executive Life later failed due to its own poor investments and reduced its payouts to retired employees. In 1985, Murdock sold the Cannon Mills business to Fieldcrest.

Also in 1985, Murdock took over the nearly bankrupt Hawaiian firm Castle & Cooke, which owned pineapple and banana producer, Dole Food Company. He developed Castle & Cooke's real estate portfolio into residential and commercial properties, and turned Dole into the world's largest producer of fruits and vegetables. Acquiring Dole privately in 2003, Murdock completed a $446 million initial public offering in October 2009, with the company trading on the New York Stock Exchange under the ticker DOLE until a private merger agreement was approved on October 31, 2013. As a result of his purchase of Castle & Cooke, Murdock acquired ownership of 98% of Lanai, the sixth-largest island in Hawaii. In June 2012, Murdock sold his interest in Lanai to Larry Ellison.

== Philanthropy ==
Murdock helped contribute to the redevelopment of a 5,800,000-square-foot (540,000 m^{2}) complex in Kannapolis, North Carolina, of a biotechnology research center, the North Carolina Research Campus. The research center is a joint public-private venture, involving major North Carolina universities and private investment. The site of the research center in the middle of Kannapolis was formerly occupied by Plant #1 of Cannon Mills (which became Pillowtex after a series of mergers and acquisitions). Pillowtex filed for bankruptcy in 2003, and closed the mill. This resulted in the largest mass layoff of workers in North Carolina history. Murdock acquired the site and demolished the mill in 2006.

After the death of his third wife, Gabriele, he was involved to finding a cure for cancer, advancing nutrition, and life extension. He established the Dole Nutrition Institute to advocate the benefits of a plant-based diet to promote health and prevent disease. With the help of UCLA, he oversaw the writing of the Encyclopedia of Foods, A Guide to Healthy Nutrition. In 2006, he opened the California Health and Longevity Institute (CHLI).

Murdock contributed more than $500 million toward the creation of the North Carolina Research Campus and David H. Murdock Research Institute.

== Personal life and death ==
At age 87, Murdock was 5 ft 8 in (1.73 m) tall, and weighed 140 lb (64 kg).

He was married six times. In 1967, he married his third wife, Gabriele; they had two children together and he also adopted her son from a previous marriage, Eugene. Gabriele was diagnosed with ovarian cancer in 1983 and died in 1985. A year later, Eugene died after hitting his head while swimming in the family estate's swimming pool. In 2004, his son David Jr. died in a traffic collision on the Santa Monica Freeway.

His son Justin is CEO and executive chairman of NovaRx and is senior vice president of investments for Castle & Cooke. Previously, Justin Murdock was a director of the Dole Food Company as well as its audit and finance committee until his retirement on May 17, 2013.

In 2011, Forbes magazine ranked David Murdock as the 190th-richest person in the "Forbes 400" list and 613th in the "World's Billionaires" list. He had a net worth of US$2.4 billion as of March 2013.

From 1985, Murdock was a pescetarian and promoted a plant-based diet that is high in fruits and vegetables. He drank smoothies two or three times a day with as many as twenty fruits and vegetables, including pulverized banana and orange peels. He ate fish, seafood, egg whites, legumes and nuts, while avoiding dairy, poultry and red meat. He also shunned the use of alcohol, processed sugar and salt. Murdock did not take vitamin supplements and claimed he could live to 125 years on his plant-based diet.

Murdock died at his ranch in Hidden Valley, California, which is unincorporated Thousand Oaks, on June 9, 2025, at the age of 102.

== Selected publications ==
- The Dole Nutrition Handbook: What to Eat and How to Live for a Longer, Healthier Life (2010)
