= Donnell S. Holt =

Donnell S. Holt (March 7, 1908, Graham, North Carolina – 1982) was president and chairman of the board of Cannon Mills. He graduated from the University of North Carolina in 1926 with a major in chemistry. Holt had aspirations of attending medical school but the Great Depression made that impossible due to his family's financial state. Holt went to work at the Esther Hosiery Mill. He then got a job in the accounting section at Trevora Mills in Graham. Holt married Margaret McConnell in July 1932. Holt became vice president of Trevora in 1937.

During World War II Holt joined the Navy and served as a ground control officer for an aircraft scouting unit. He injured his back while helping pull an American flyer from a plane that had crashed into the ocean. He finished out the war as an executive officer for a navy aircraft carrier service unit. He promoted to the rank of lieutenant commander and was discharged in 1945 and returned to Trevora Mills.

Cannon Mills bought Trevora Mills in 1949. Holt stayed on under Cannon and began his successful rise within the Cannon ranks. In 1950 Holt represented the Cotton Manufacturers Institute on a mission to Japan to convince the Japanese of the benefits of raising textile prices. Holt was promoted to vice president of Cannon Mills in 1951 by Charles Cannon. He was in charge of the decorative fabric and bed-sheet division. In 1959 Holt was elected executive vice president. The following year Holt was named president of Cannon Mills of New York, the sales division of the company. Charles Cannon retired to the position of chairman of the board in 1962. Holt was chosen by Cannon as the new president and chief executive officer of Cannon Mills.

Holt changed things at Cannon Mills once he became president. He introduced a modern management style and was not afraid to bring younger men into the mill and give them leadership roles. He implemented a public relations campaign to combat the negative images of Cannon Mills produced by the Justice Departments claim of discriminatory practices in company housing and for the idea that Cannon personal dominated Kannapolis affairs.

Charlie Cannon died in 1971 and Holt was reelected president and named chairman of the board, taking Cannon's place. Holt's position marked the first time a non-Cannon had been in charge of the mill. He struggled to keep the mill going in a poor economy. Holt stopped an attempt to unionize the mill. Holt retired in 1974 but stayed on the board of directors until 1980. Holt died in 1982 from kidney disease.
