= SS James W. Cannon =

World War II Liberty ship of the United States

History

United States
- Name: James W. Cannon
- Namesake: James William Cannon
- Ordered: as type (EC2-S-C1) hull, MC hull 2366
- Builder: J.A. Jones Construction, Brunswick, Georgia
- Cost: $1,030,096
- Yard number: 151
- Way number: 5
- Laid down: 25 May 1944
- Launched: 12 July 1944
- Sponsored by: Mrs. Charles A. Cannon
- Completed: 26 July 1944
- Identification: Call Signal: WRFV
- Fate: Sold for commercial use, 12 January 1951

United States
- Name: Transoceanic
- Operator: Pan Cargo Shipping Corporation
- Acquired: 19 January 1951
- Renamed: National Mariner
- Fate: Sold to National Shipping & Trading Corp., 7 August 1961

Greece
- Operator: John Theodoracopoulos
- Acquired: 6 September 1961
- Fate: Scrapped, 1963

General characteristics
- Class & type: Liberty ship; type EC2-S-C1, standard
- Tonnage: 10,865 LT DWT; 7,176 GRT
- Displacement: 3,380 long tons (3,434 t) (light); 14,245 long tons (14,474 t) (max)
- Length: 441 feet 6 inches (135 m) oa; 416 feet (127 m) pp; 427 feet (130 m) lwl
- Beam: 57 feet (17 m)
- Draft: 27 ft 9.25 in (8.4646 m)
- Installed power: 2 × Oil fired 450 °F (232 °C) boilers, operating at 220 psi (1,500 kPa); 2,500 hp (1,900 kW)
- Propulsion: 1 × triple-expansion steam engine, (manufactured by General Machinery Corp., Hamilton, Ohio); 1 × screw propeller
- Speed: 11.5 knots (21.3 km/h; 13.2 mph)
- Capacity: 562,608 cubic feet (15,931 m^{3}) (grain); 499,573 cubic feet (14,146 m^{3}) (bale)
- Complement: 38–62 USMM; 21–40 USNAG
- Armament: Varied by ship; Bow-mounted 3-inch (76 mm)/50-caliber gun; Stern-mounted 4-inch (102 mm)/50-caliber gun; 2–8 × single 20-millimeter (0.79 in) Oerlikon anti-aircraft (AA) cannons and/or, 2–8 × 37-millimeter (1.46 in) M1 AA guns

SS James W. Cannon was a Liberty ship built in the United States during World War II. She was named after James William Cannon, the founder of Cannon Mills Corporation.

== Construction ==
James W. Cannon was laid down on 25 May 1944, under a Maritime Commission (MARCOM) contract, MC hull 2366, by J.A. Jones Construction, Brunswick, Georgia; she was sponsored by Mrs. Charles A. Cannon, daughter-in-law of James William Cannon, and launched on 12 July 1944.

== History ==
She was allocated to the International Freighting Corp., on 26 July 1944. On 8 June 1950, she was laid up in the National Defense Reserve Fleet in Astoria, Oregon. On 12 January 1951, she was sold, to Pan Cargo Shipping Corp., for commercial use. She was renamed Transoceanic and later National Mariner. On 7 August 1961, she was sold to National Shipping & Trading Corp., who turned around and sold her to John Theodoracopoulos, on 6 September 1961, and flagged for Greece. She was scrapped in 1963.

== Bibliography ==
- "Jones Construction, Brunswick GA". www.ShipbuildingHistory.com. 13 October 2010.
- "Liberty Ships – World War II".
- Maritime Administration. "James W. Cannon". Ship History Database Vessel Status Card. U.S. Department of Transportation, Maritime Administration. Archived from the original on 12 December 2019.
- Davies, James (May 2004). "Specifications (As-Built)" (PDF). p. 23.
- "SS James W. Cannon".
