= Naptown =

Naptown is a nickname and may refer to:

- Naples, Florida
- Indianapolis, Indiana
- Annapolis, Maryland
- Kannapolis, North Carolina
