= Charles Albert Cannon =

American textile mill owner (1892–1971)

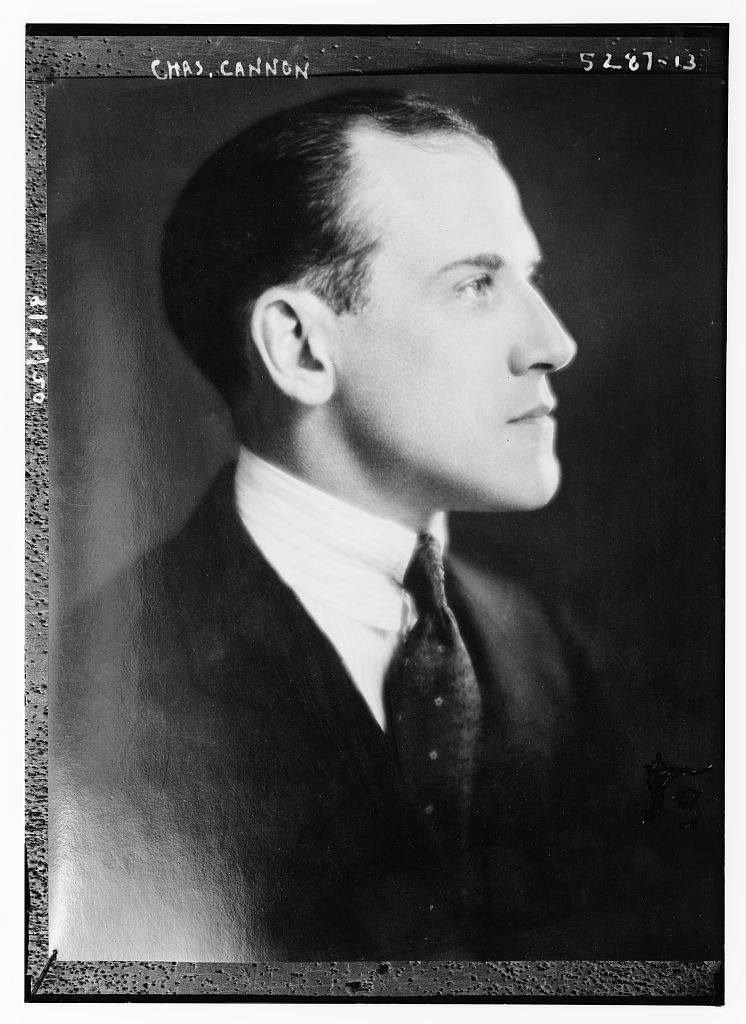
- Charles Albert Cannon c. 1920
- Born: November 29, 1892; Concord, North Carolina
- Died: April 2, 1971 (aged 78); Concord, North Carolina
- Occupation: textile mill owner
- Spouses: Ruth Coltrane Cannon
- Children: Charles Albert Cannon Jr. Mariam Cannon Hayes; Mary Ruth Cannon Spencer; William Coltrane Cannon

Charles Albert Cannon (November 29, 1892 – April 2, 1971) was the son of Cannon Mills Company founder James William Cannon and president of the firm from the 1920s to the 1960s. He was born, lived and died in Concord, North Carolina.

== With Cannon Mills ==
Cannon Mills manufacturing plants were located mainly in and around Concord, North Carolina and particularly in nearby Kannapolis, North Carolina, a company-owned town created and named after the Cannon family. Cannon Mills headquarters was in Concord, and the family mansion in downtown Concord is now part of the First Presbyterian Church complex.

There were multiple plants employing thousands of people during this time, running three shifts and producing sheets and towels.

His grandson, Robin Hayes, was a Republican congressman from North Carolina.
