= Smith Barrier =

American sports journalist (1916–1989)

Henry Smith Barrier Jr. (July 17, 1916 – June 2, 1989) was an American sports journalist. He was the longtime Executive Sports Editor of Greensboro News & Record and served as president of United States Basketball Writers Association from 1970 to 1971. He is a charter member of the United States Basketball Writers Association Hall of Fame. In 1999, Barrier was awarded the Basketball Hall of Fame's Curt Gowdy Media Award for outstanding contributions in electronic and print media. Barrier is also a member of the North Carolina Sports Hall of Fame (inducted in 1980).

Barrier was born in Concord, North Carolina in 1916, and was a 1934 graduate of Concord High School and a 1938 graduate of the University of North Carolina. After graduation, he became a sportswriter at his hometown paper, The Concord Daily Tribune from 1938 to 1941, before moving to the Greensboro Daily News. He became the Daily News sports editor in 1944 and later the Daily Record, which merged to become the Greensboro News & Record. Barrier's account of UCLA's Lew Alcindor in the 1967 UCLA-Dayton game in the 1967 NCAA Men's Division I Basketball Tournament earned him a spot in the book "Best Sports Stories 1970".

Writing about UCLA's national champion basketball teams under John Wooden, he said, "Mister John Wooden has a watch factory out in Los Angeles. It's a bit different from most Swiss works. They don't make watches, they win 'em."
