= James McDuffie =

American politician

James Doyle McDuffie (November 17, 1929 – May 21, 2015) was an American educator and politician.

Born in Kannapolis, North Carolina, McDuffie went to Pfeiffer University, Lenoir–Rhyne University and then graduated from Catawba College. He joined the United States Air Force after college and was stationed in Denver, Colorado. McDuffie then received his bachelor's degree in history from the University of Denver. In 1954, McDuffie and his wife moved to Charlotte, North Carolina where he was a coach and teacher in junior high school. Then, in 1956, he worked for State Farm insurance agency. McDuffie served on the Charlotte City Council. McDuffie then served in the North Carolina Senate as a Republican. McDuffie died in Charlotte in 2015.
