= Nick Leverett =

American football player (born 1997)

No. 51 – Dallas Cowboys
- Position: Guard
- Roster status: Active

Personal information
- Born: January 11, 1997 (age 29); Charlotte, North Carolina, U.S.
- Listed height: 6 ft 3 in (1.91 m)
- Listed weight: 310 lb (141 kg)

Career information
- High school: Concord (Concord, North Carolina)
- College: NC Central (2015–2018); Rice (2019)
- NFL draft: 2020: undrafted

Career history
- Tampa Bay Buccaneers (2020–2023); New England Patriots (2024); Arizona Cardinals (2024–2025)*; Dallas Cowboys (2025–present)
- * Offseason or practice squad member only

Career NFL statistics as of Week 3, 2026
- Games played: 26
- Games started: 11
- Stats at Pro Football Reference

Nicholas Leverett (born January 11, 1997) is an American professional football guard for the Dallas Cowboys of the National Football League (NFL). Leverett played college football for the North Carolina Central Eagles and Rice Owls. Leverett has played for the Tampa Bay Buccaneers, New England Patriots, and Arizona Cardinals.

== Early life ==
Nicholas Leverett was born on January 11, 1997, in Charlotte, North Carolina. He attended Concord High School and played football, baseball, and track and field while there. He was chosen to play in the North Carolina Shrine Bowl while at Concord High School.

== College career ==
After finishing high school, Leverett attended North Carolina Central University. During his freshman year, Leverett chose to redshirt. In his redshirt freshman year, Leverett started all 12 games and earned 3rd team All-Mid-Eastern Athletic Conference (MEAC) in that year. In his redshirt sophomore year, he started all 11 games and earned 2nd team All-MEAC. During his redshirt junior year, he again started all 11 games and earned 2nd team All-MEAC. He was also a distinguished recipient of the 2018 Allstate AFCA Good Works Team award, one of only 22 players to be recognized. Leverett transferred to Rice University and while there as a graduate transfer in his senior year was an All-Conference USA honorable mention. Also while at Rice, Leverett was selected to play in the College Gridiron All-Star Showcase.

== Professional career ==
Pre-draft measurables
Height	Weight	Arm length	Hand span	Wingspan
6 ft 3 in (1.91 m)	310 lb (141 kg)	32 1/4 in (0.82 m)	8 3/4 in (0.22 m)	6 ft 8 3/4 in (2.05 m)
All values from Pro Day

=== Tampa Bay Buccaneers ===
After going undrafted in the 2020 NFL draft, Leverett was signed as an undrafted free agent by the Tampa Bay Buccaneers on May 5, 2020. He continued to be a member of the team, predominantly on the practice squad, until January 27, 2021. Leverett was briefly waived and later re-signed onto the practice squad on February 10. However, this caused Leverett not to be a part of the team that won Super Bowl LV, which was on February 7. Leverett was activated onto the active roster at the outset of the Buccaneers' Week 1 game against the Dallas Cowboys due to linebacker Cam Gill being placed on injured reserve.

=== New England Patriots ===
After four seasons with the Buccaneers, Leverett signed with the New England Patriots on March 15, 2024. On October 14, Leverett was released by the Patriots.

=== Arizona Cardinals ===
On October 16, 2024, Leverett signed with the Arizona Cardinals' practice squad. On December 31, the Cardinals signed Leverett to their active roster.

On August 26, 2025, Leverett was waived by the Cardinals as part of final roster cuts and re-signed to the practice squad the next day. He was released on November 5.

=== Dallas Cowboys ===
On November 19, 2025, Leverett signed with the Dallas Cowboys' practice squad. He signed a reserve/future contract with Dallas on January 6, 2026.

On August 30, 2026, Leverett was released by the Cowboys as a part of final roster cuts; he was re–signed to the practice squad the next day. He was promoted to the active roster on September 9. On October 12, Leverett was released and re-signed to the practice squad the next day. On November 17, he was signed to the active roster.
