= Dole Nutrition Institute =

Coordinates: 35.2264°N 80.8446°W

The Dole Nutrition Institute (DNI) is a research and education foundation within the Dole plc and is based in Kannapolis, North Carolina, at the North Carolina Research Campus. The DNI was founded by David H. Murdock in 2003. The institute exists as a resource offering educational publications on a plant-based diet.

== Activities ==
The Dole Nutrition Institute offers self-produced health and nutrition segments.

=== Newsletter ===
In 2008, the Web Marketing Association (WMA) awarded Dole Nutrition News (DNN) their International Advertising Competition Award for Outstanding Achievement in Internet Advertising - Best Food Industry On-line Newsletter Award.

== Corporate Wellness Toolkit ==
The Corporate Wellness Toolkit teaches businesses how to promote healthy eating and exercise. The kit includes signage, newsletters, videos, and instructional materials which encourage businesses to provide weight loss seminars, trainers, and healthier foods for their employees.

== School Salad Days ==
The School Salad Days program was designed to encourage healthy eating habits and promote daily fruit and vegetable consumption in California public schools. The pilot program was launched in 2006 with the donation of fifty full-service portable salad bars to public schools in California. DNI gave these schools nutrition information, worked with schools to develop fruit baskets to be sold as fund-raising alternatives, and helped schools plant on-site "edible gardens".

== Children's Hunger Fund ==
In 2007, Dole Nutrition Institute donated nearly 250,000 nutrition-focused publications to the Children's Hunger Fund (CHF), an international non-profit organization. CHF is now including these materials in their Food Paks, 20 lb. boxes of staple foods, which are delivered to the homes of needy families. The donation included DNI's "Health & Wellness" brochure series and "What You Need to Eat Every Day & Why" in English and Spanish. For the children, "Dole's 5-A-Day the Color Way" coloring books and bookmarks help kids focus on their own nutrition and to make good food choices in the future.

== Vitamin D mushroom powder ==
In 2012 at the Natural Products ExpoWest convention in California, the Dole Nutrition Institute was awarded the NutrAward for its product entry as the Best New Finished Product – a portobello mushroom powder containing 20,000 IU of vitamin D2 per gram. The product was marketed to provide a simple vegan dietary solution to meeting vitamin D deficiency.

== See also ==
- Nutrition
