= Holland Thompson (historian) =

- Born: July 30, 1873; Randolph County, North Carolina, U.S.
- Died: October 21, 1940 (aged 67); New York City, New York, U.S.
- Occupation: Historian
- Spouse: Isobel Graham Aitken
- Children: 1 son

Holland McTyeire Thompson (July 30, 1873 – October 21, 1940), was an American historian who wrote about the New South.

== Early life ==
Thompson was born in Randolph County, North Carolina. He graduated from the University of North Carolina.

== Career ==
Thompson served as a high school principal at Concord High School in Concord, North Carolina from 1895–99, where he wrote an essay about the transformation of southern culture from a rural agricultural to textile/manufacturing way of life that he witnessed while an educator in Concord. This essay, in part, gained Thompson admittance to Columbia University where he received his Ph.D. in 1901, and became a full professor of history at City College of New York.

Thompson, while professor at CCNY, was among the leading scholar/historians of the social and industrial transformation of the New South in the early decades of the 20th century.

== Personal life and death ==
Thompson married Isobel Graham Aitken of New York in 1905. They had one son, Lawrence.

Thompson died on October 21, 1940.

== Works ==
- From the Cotton Field to the Cotton Mill: A Study of the Industrial Transition in North Carolina (1906). New York: Macmillan. OCLC 16411826
- The New South: A Chronicle of Social and Industrial Evolution Yale Chronicles of America Series (1919). New Haven: Yale University Press. OCLC 17361006
- The Book of History: The World's Greatest War, From the Outbreak of the War to the Treaty of Versailles (1920-1921). New York: Grolier Society. OCLC 433926221
- The Age of Invention: A Chronicle of Mechanical Conquest (1921). New Haven: Yale University Press. OCLC 3616164
- Canada--Newfoundland--Canadian Parks (1940). New York: Grolier Society. OCLC 20137346
- England--Wales (1940). New York: Grolier Society. OCLC 20137360
- North and South Poles: Eskimos, Indians (1940). New York: Grolier Society. OCLC 670479042
- Scandinavia--Finland--Iceland (1940). New York: Grolier Society. OCLC 20137475
- South America (1940). New York: Grolier Society. OCLC 613221376
