= Pillowtex Corporation =

American textile manufacturer (1954–2003)

- Company type: Private
- Traded as: NYSE: PTX
- Industry: Textile
- Founded: 1954; 72 years ago
- Defunct: 2003
- Fate: Bankruptcy, assets liquidated
- Successor: Iconix Brand Group
- Headquarters: Dallas, Texas, Kannapolis, North Carolina
- Key people: David H. Murdock
- Products: Bedding products (pillows, towels, bed sheets, mattress protectors)
- Brands: Cannon; Charisma; Fieldcrest; Royal Velvet
- Number of employees: 14,000
- Parent: Amoskeag Company
- Subsidiaries: Fieldcrest Cannon; Beacon Blankets

Pillowtex Corporation was an American textile manufacturing company from 1954 to 2003. Beginning as a pillow manufacturer, the company diversified and manufactured bedsheets under various brand names. The company was officially declared bankrupt on October 7, 2003. The company liquidated over the following nine years, including machinery and brands.

== Origins ==
Pillowtex was established in 1954 in Dallas, Texas, as a pillow manufacturer. Over time, Pillowtex's range of products extended to bed sheets, and mattress protectors. The company made over 10,000 products and was an industry leader in manufacturing blankets, pillows, mattress pads, and comforters. At its peak, Pillowtex operated 16 manufacturing and distribution facilities and employed over 7,650 people. Its tradenames included Beacon Manufacturing, Bigelow-Sanford, Fieldcrest Cannon, Leshner Corp. and Wiscassett Mills. Pillowtex was publicly traded on the New York Stock Exchange (NYSE) as PTX.

In September 1997, Pillowtex acquired the Fieldcrest-Cannon bedsheet company of Kannapolis, North Carolina, for US$700 million in cash and stock. The acquisition tripled Pillowtex's sales. Pillowtex spent a further $133 million to consolidate operations, update plants to lower manufacturing costs and implement new information technology systems. In 1998, Pillowtex bought The Leshner Corporation for about $75 million. By the third quarter of 1998 however, sales missed expectations, and earnings declined, continuing its slide into 1999. Pillowtex's share price dropped from $46 to $11. By the end of 1999, Pillowtex was heavily leveraged. It had long-term debt of $1.01 billion and equity of just $242 million.

== Bankruptcy ==
In November 2000, Pillowtex filed for Chapter 11 bankruptcy protection. At the time, annual sales were $1.4 billion. The company arranged for debtor-in-possession financing of $150 million from the Bank of America and other lenders. In May 2002, Pillowtex briefly surfaced from bankruptcy for little more than a year, but things kept sliding. On July 30, 2003, Pillowtex Corporation announced the complete bankruptcy of the company. Pillowtex filed a bankruptcy petition in the United States Bankruptcy Court on July 20, 2003. A Chapter 11 liquidating plan was confirmed, which created the Pillowtex Liquidating Trust.

Overnight, 7,650 people were laid off (4,340 in its Kannapolis plant alone). This was the largest permanent layoff in the history of the state of North Carolina. The bankruptcy announcement also included an agreement for Pillowtex assets to be sold to GGST LLC, a joint venture of four liquidation companies (SB Capital Group, Gibbs International, Gordon Brothers Retail Partners and Tiger Capital Group), for $56 million, subject to bankruptcy court approval.

According to a former CEO of Pillowtex, its largest product buyer, Walmart, encouraged the company to move production overseas [to remain competitive] but Pillowtex refused. It was undercut by competitors (producing overseas at lower prices) and when its prices were no longer competitive, the company no longer received orders from Walmart. The UNITE textile workers union issued a statement blaming job layoffs on free-trade legislation, making American companies uncompetitive.

On October 7, 2003, Pillowtex won approval from a bankruptcy court judge to sell company assets, including machinery and brands, to GGST LLC for $128 million. The brands "Cannon", "Royal Velvet", "Charisma", and "Fieldcrest" became the intellectual property of SB Capital. The "Cannon" and "Royal Velvet" brands have since been licensed by Li & Fung, headquartered in Hong Kong. "Fieldcrest" branded products have reappeared as "exclusively at Target". Iconix Brand Group bought the remaining Pillowtex brand in 2007.

== Demolition ==
On December 10, 2004, Castle & Cooke, a real estate company owned by California billionaire David H. Murdock which acquired the Cannon Mills plant in 1983, had won the 264 acres (1.07 km^{2}) land auction with a bid of $6.4 million ($4.25 million in cash and a $2.12 million note).

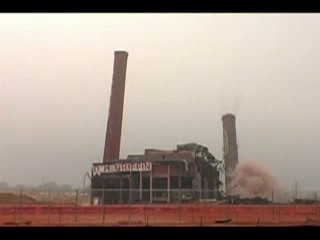
Implosion of the remains of Plant 1 in Kannapolis, August 10, 2006

Beginning in June 2005, workers of the D.H. Griffin Wrecking Company began the demolition of Plant 1 in Kannapolis, an area the size of The Pentagon. In November 2005, the eastern half of the Towel Distribution Center was imploded, and the main office building was completely demolished by the end of the year. Town Lake was drained and filled in.

On March 24, 2006, the remaining portion of the Towel Distribution Center and the Bleachery were imploded. Over 1,200,000 square feet (110,000 m^{2}) was demolished, making it the third largest building implosion in U.S. history. A few months later, on August 10, the smokestacks were imploded. On November 8, of that year, the 268-foot (82 m) water tower was demolished, officially ending the Cannon Mills era.

The Pillowtex brand was bought by Pacific Pillows in 2009, which manufactures and sells memory and latex foam pillows under that name. Oak Point Partners acquired the remnant assets of the Pillowtex Liquidating Trust in February 2012.

== See also ==
- Cannon Mills Company, the Kannapolis, North Carolina facility
