= Dixie Upright =

American baseball player (1926-1986)

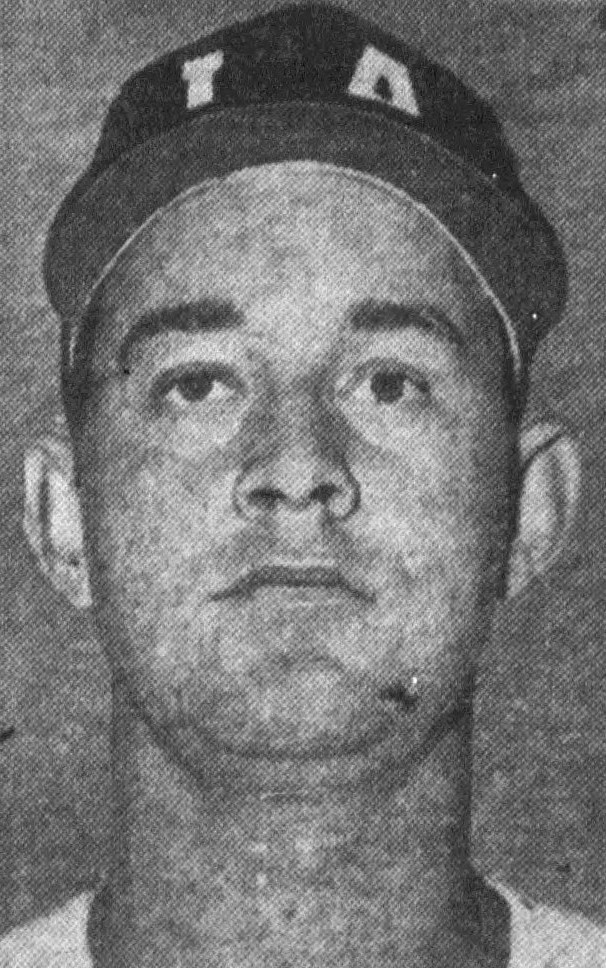
- Upright, circa 1954
- Pinch hitter
- Born: May 30, 1926; Kannapolis, North Carolina, U.S.
- Died: November 13, 1986 (aged 60); Concord, North Carolina, U.S.
- Batted: Left Threw: Left

MLB debut
- April 18, 1953, for the St. Louis Browns

Last MLB appearance
- May 10, 1953, for the St. Louis Browns

MLB statistics
- Batting average: .250
- Home runs: 1
- Runs batted in: 1
- Stats at Baseball Reference

Teams
- St. Louis Browns (1953)

R. T. "Dixie" Upright (May 30, 1926 – November 13, 1986) was an American left-handed, 6 ft 0 in (1.83 m), 175 pound Major League Baseball player who played for the St. Louis Browns in 1953.

Prior to playing professional baseball, he attended Cannon High School in Kannapolis.

Signed by the Pittsburgh Pirates as an amateur free agent in 1947, Upright was sent to the Chicago White Sox in an unknown transaction before the 1951 season. On January 20, 1953, he was traded with $25,000 to the Browns for Fred Marsh. Upright made his big league debut on April 18 of that year. He appeared in a total of nine games, collecting two hits (including a home run) in eight at-bats, for an average of .250. He also scored three times and drove in one run.

Upright played in his final big league game on May 10. On May 13, the Browns released him, and he was quickly signed by the Chicago Cubs on that same day. Upright never again appeared in the major leagues.

In 1958, he hit .343 with 17 homers and 116 RBI for the Amarillo Gold Sox of the Western League, earning him a spot on the All-Star team.
