= George Washington Carver High School (Kannapolis, North Carolina) =

Location
- Kannapolis, North Carolina; U.S.
- Coordinates: 35.4928°N 80.6158°W

Information
- Former name: Centerview Colored School
- Type: Public
- Nickname: Rams

George Washington Carver High School was a public secondary school in Kannapolis, North Carolina. It served as the high school for black students from 1936 until the public schools were integrated in 1967.

== History ==
The school was originally opened in 1923 as Centerview Colored School and was the first official school building for African-Americans in Kannapolis. In 1936, the buildings were augmented with an auditorium and an 8 room brick addition, and renamed after George Washington Carver. The school served students in grades K-12. The largest graduating class, 60 students, graduated in 1965. After integration, the buildings were used as an elementary school. The structures were mostly destroyed by fire in the 1970s. A small portion of the 1936 building survived and is used for offices and as a career center. From 1980 to 2005, the site was used as a middle school. In 2017 a new Carver Elementary School was opened on the site.
