= Harvey Jeremiah Peeler House =

Historic house in North Carolina, United States

- U.S. National Register of Historic Places
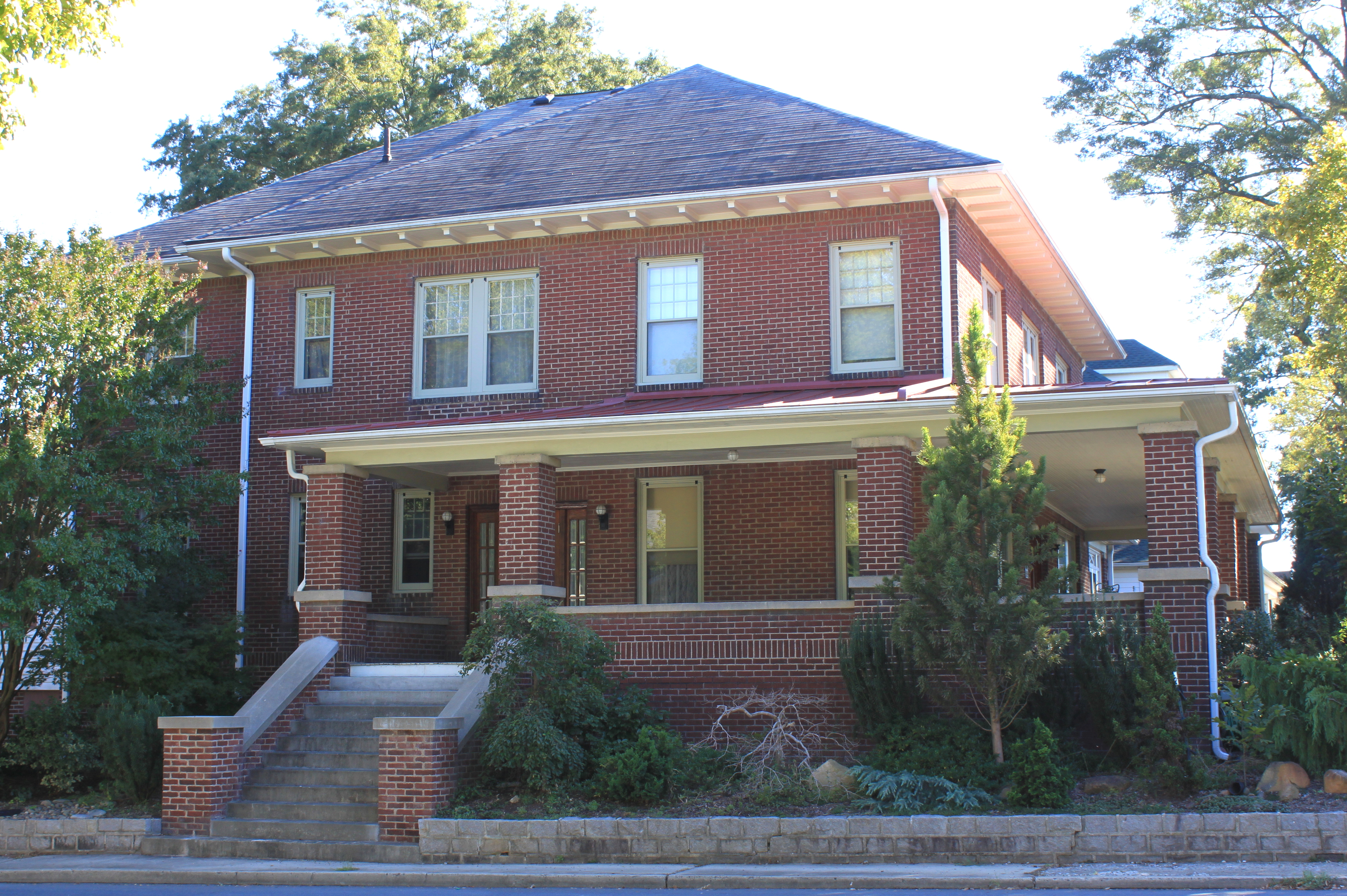

- Location within North Carolina Location within the United States
- Location: 101 S. Ridge Ave. Kannapolis, North Carolina
- Coordinates: 35°29′50″N 80°37′24″W
- Area: 0.3 acres (0.12 ha)
- Built: 1923
- Architect: Reading, Leonard O.
- Architectural style: Bungalow/craftsman, Colonial Revival
- NRHP reference No.: 07000818
- Added to NRHP: August 16, 2007

Harvey Jeremiah Peeler House, also known as Lady's Funeral Home, is a historic home located at Kannapolis, Cabarrus County, North Carolina. It was built in 1923, and is two-story, American Craftsman / Colonial Revival style brick house with a hipped roof. It features a one-story wraparound front porch with two formal entrances. Also on the property is a contributing garage. In 1950 the house was leased to Lady's Funeral Home, which operated there until 1968.

It was listed on the National Register of Historic Places in 2007.
