= Direct solar irradiance =

Direct insolation, also called direct normal irradiance (DNI), is the insolation measured at a given location on Earth with a surface element perpendicular to the Sun's rays, excluding diffuse insolation (the solar radiation that is scattered or reflected by gas molecules and particulate matter in the atmosphere). Direct insolation is equal to the solar irradiance above the atmosphere minus the atmospheric losses due to absorption and scattering. While the solar irradiance above the atmosphere varies with the Earth–Sun distance and solar cycles, the losses depend on the time of day (length of light's path through the atmosphere depending on the solar elevation angle), cloud cover, humidity, and other impurities.

== Simplified formula ==
A simple formula gives the approximate level of direct insolation when there are no clouds:

$$I_D=1.353\text{ kW/m}^2\times 0.7^{AM^{0.678}}$$

where AM is the airmass given, approximately, by

$$AM=\frac 1{\cos\theta}$$

with θ being the solar zenith angle (90° minus the altitude) of the sun. While the above formula for airmass gives reasonable results for solar zenith angles up to 60°, it degrades rapidly afterwards, especially after 75°. For more accurate formulas, refer to the main article about airmass.

For the sun at the zenith, this gives 947 W/m^{2}. However, another source states that direct sunlight under these conditions, with 1367 W/m^{2} above the atmosphere, is about 1050 W/m^{2}, and total insolation about 1120 W/m^{2}.

== Average direct insolation ==
For practical purposes, a time-average of the direct insolation over the course of the year is commonly used. This averaging takes into account the absence of sunlight during the night, increased scatter in the morning and evening hours, average effects of cloud cover and smog, as well as seasonal variations of the mid-day solar elevation.

== Units of measurement ==
Direct insolation is measured in watts per square metre (W/m^{2}) or kilowatt-hours per square meter per day (kW·h/(m^{2}·day)).

1 kW·h/(m^{2}·day) = 1,000 W · 1 hour / ( 1 m^{2} · 24 hours) = 41.67 W/m^{2}

In the case of photovoltaics, average direct insolation is commonly measured in terms of peak direct insolation as kWh/(kWp·y) (kilowatt hours per year per kilowatt peak rating).

== Surface-based measurement ==
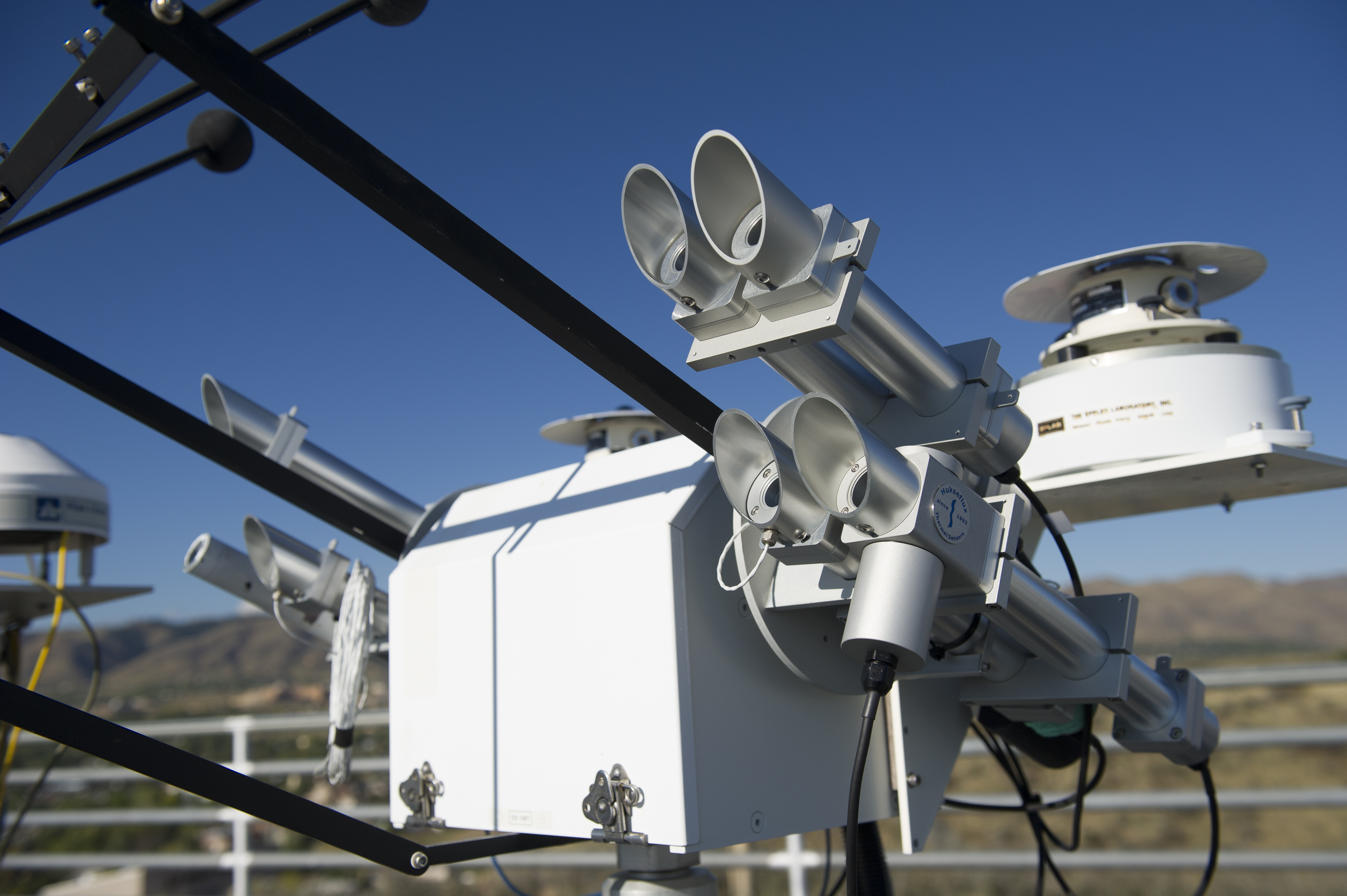
Pyrheliometers mounted on a solar tracker

The most accurate measurements are performed with absolute cavity radiometers, which serve as primary reference standards maintained under the World Radiometric Reference (WRR). Field measurements are usually carried out with precision thermopile pyrheliometers calibrated against WRR standards.

A Pyrheliometer is a radiometric instrument that measures the solar irradiance within a narrow solid angle centered on the solar disk. The pyrheliometer needs to be mounted on a solar tracker which ensures that the sensor’s aperture remains perpendicular to the solar beam throughout the day.

The WMO recommends that the "small solid angle" for measurement of DNI with pyrheliometers be 6 ∙ 10^{−3} sr, equivalent to ≈ 2.5° half angle (WMO 2018), which allows inclusion of a small portion of circumsolar radiation while compensating for minor tracking errors. The measured magnitude is the integrated irradiance over this aperture and thus includes both the direct solar disk and a limited fraction of forward-scattered light (circumsolar irradiance).

Other instruments are used when a pyrheliometer or solar tracker is not available. These include:

- Rotating shadowband irradiometers (RSI) — devices that alternately measure global and diffuse horizontal irradiance at short intervals; DNI is derived as the difference between the two corrected for solar zenith angle.
- Shaded pyranometer systems, where one sensor measures global irradiance and another shaded sensor measures diffuse irradiance.
- Sunshine pyranometers, which estimate DNI algorithmically based on thermopile arrays and shading patterns and sky models.

While these systems offer lower cost and simpler operation, their accuracy is typically lower (often within ±5%) compared with standard pyrheliometers, which can achieve uncertainties below ±1.5% under clear-sky conditions.

== Circumsolar radiation ==
Circumsolar radiation is the scattered radiation coming from the annular region surrounding the solar disk (solar aureola). For the typical field of view of modern pyrheliometers, circumsolar radiation contributes a variable amount to the DNI measurement, depending on atmospheric conditions. Determining the magnitude of the circumsolar radiation is of interest in concentrating solar applications because DNI measurements are typically larger than the beam irradiance that can be effectively used in concentrating systems.

The contribution of circumsolar radiation to the pyrheliometric DNI measurement depends on different factors, like:

- Aerosol optical depth (AOD)
- Cloud and cirrus cover
- Water vapor content
- Air mass and solar elevation
- Geographic and seasonal variations

The ratio of the circumsolar irradiance to the sum of the circumsolar and solar disc irradiances (Circumsolar Ratio or CSR) is often used in solar energy to quantify this contribution.

== Satellite-based measurement ==
Although surface-based measurement is generally much more accurate, its availability is sparse. The NASA POWER provides the CERES-based hourly DNI on a grid system of 1° latitude by 1° longitude along with other variables.

== Applications ==
Since radiation directly from the sun can be focussed with mirrors and lens, it can be applied to concentrated solar thermal (CST) systems. Due to clouds and aerosols, the direct insolation can fluctuate throughout the day, so forecasting the available resource is important in these applications

== Not to be confused with DirHI ==
It is usually assumed that the term direct irradiance, direct radiation, or direct insolation refers to the irradiance intercepted by a surface normal, or perpendicular, to the direct sunlight. However, when the word normal is omitted, it can also mean direct horizontal irradiance (DirHI), the direct irradiance received on a horizontal surface. The following relation holds
$$\text{DirHI}=\text{DNI} \times \cos (z)$$
for instantaneous and coincident values of DirHI, DNI and $z$, the solar zenith angle. For means of DirHI, DNI and $z$ over finite periods of time from minutes up to an hour, the above relation may be used approximately.

== See also ==
- Solar irradiance- main article discussing total solar irradiance and subcomponents direct normal, diffuse horizontal, global horizontal, global tilted and global normal irradiances.
- Diffuse sky radiation
