= Meek House =

Historic house in North Carolina, United States

- U.S. National Register of Historic Places
- Location within North Carolina Location within the United States
- Location: 1615 Morrison Rd. Concord, North Carolina
- Coordinates: 35°27′38.4768″N 80°40′14.6928″W
- Area: 13.8 acres (5.6 ha)
- Built: 1831
- Architectural style: Federal, Greek Revival
- NRHP reference No.: 01001026
- Added to NRHP: September 24, 2001

Meek House, also known as Lin Oaks, is a historic house located in Concord, North Carolina. It was built about 1831, and is a two-story, single-pile, side gabled, Federal / Greek Revival style house. Also on the property is a contributing single-pen "Wheat House."

It was listed on the National Register of Historic Places on September 24, 2001.
