= Documento Nacional de Identidad =

Documento Nacional de Identidad means "National Identity document" (or National identity card) in Spanish. It is the name used by:

- Documento Nacional de Identidad (Argentina)
- Documento Nacional de Identidad (Peru)
- Documento Nacional de Identidad (Spain)

== See also ==
- Cédula de identidad
