= North Carolina Research Campus =

Research center in Kannapolis, North Carolina, United States

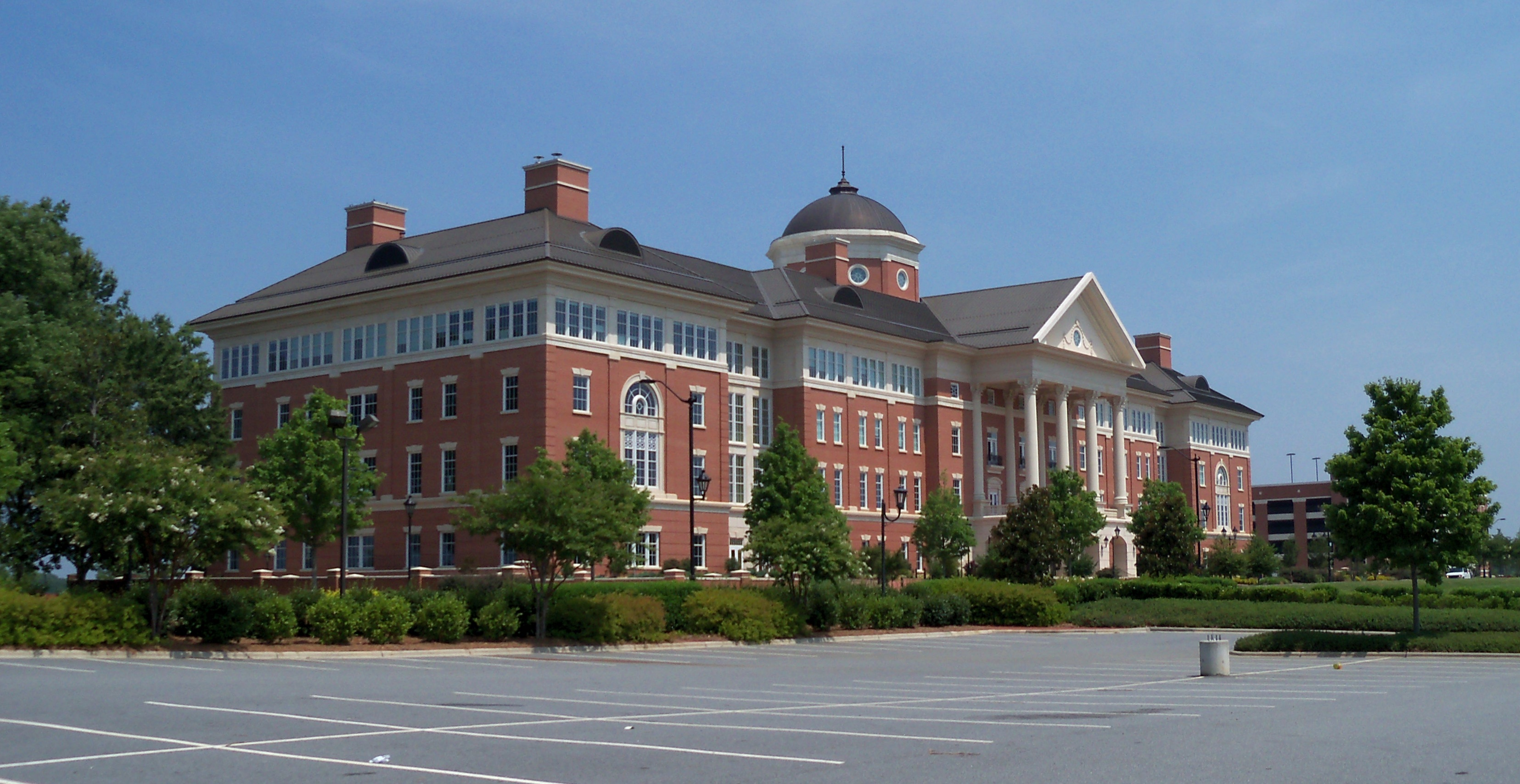
- David H. Murdock Core Laboratory on the North Carolina Research Campus
- Abbreviation: NCRC
- Formation: 2008; 17 years ago
- Headquarters: Kannapolis, North Carolina
- Parent organization: University of North Carolina
- Website: ncresearchcampus.net

The North Carolina Research Campus (NCRC) is a public-private research center in Kannapolis, North Carolina, United States. The Campus was envisioned by David H. Murdock, owner of Dole Food Company and Castle and Cooke, Inc., as a center for improving human health through research into nutrition and agriculture. The campus was formed and operates as a partnership with the State of North Carolina and the University of North Carolina system.

The scientists at the NC Research Campus are known for research that explores the health benefits of plant phytochemicals, nutrients such as choline and the impact of nutrition and exercise on human performance. Research also involves the study of nutrients and plant-based compounds to prevent chronic diseases such as cancer and diabetes.

== About ==
The North Carolina Research Campus is located in Kannapolis, NC, near Charlotte. As a scientific community of eight universities, the David H. Murdock Research Institute, global companies and entrepreneurs, the shared mission is to improve human health through nutrition. Research and development focuses on safer, more nutritious crops, healthier foods and precision nutrition.

== History ==
The textile mill then known as Cannon Mills, the largest manufacturer of home textiles in the world, was purchased by David H. Murdock, chairman and owner of Dole Food Company, in 1982. Murdock's firm Pacific Holding Company sold the mill to Fieldcrest Mills, Inc. in 1986, and it became known as Fieldcrest Cannon. It was later sold to Pillowtex Corporation in 1997. Murdock retained substantial property holdings in Kannapolis after the sale. Pillowtex Corporation filed for bankruptcy in 2003, and the mill closed. This resulted in the largest mass layoff in North Carolina history, affecting 4,800 workers.

Along with support from the State of North Carolina and the University of North Carolina System, Murdock announced the establishment of the North Carolina Research Campus. Murdock acquired the Pillowtex site and demolished the mill. Construction started quickly on the campus after the six-million-square-foot textile mill was demolished in 2004. The first building, the 311,000 square-foot David H. Murdock Research Core Laboratory, opened in 2008 along with the North Carolina State University Plants for Human Health Institute building and the UNC Chapel Hill Nutrition Research Institute building.

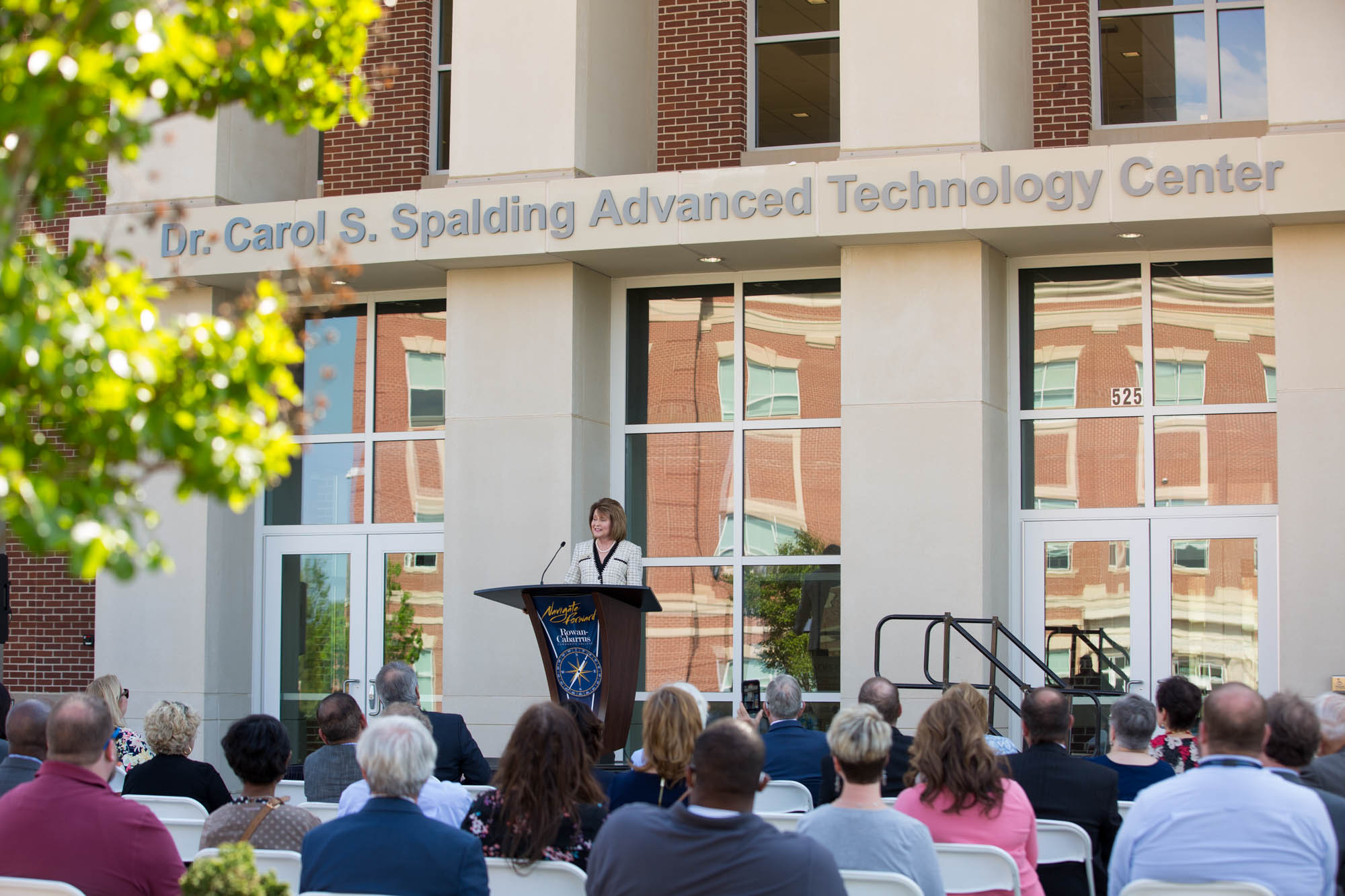

Rowan-Cabarrus Community College was the first community college to establish a presence at the North Carolina Research Campus in 2010. Today, the college operates two buildings on the campus: the Biotechnology Building and the Dr. Carol S. Spalding Advanced Technology Center, which opened in 2021. These facilities provide specialized education and training programs in health sciences, advanced manufacturing, and BioWork, preparing students for careers in high-demand industries.

The headquarters of the Cabarrus Health Alliance, the regional public health authority, opened in 2012. The following year, a 60,000 square foot Class A medical office building opened with Carolinas Healthcare System as the main tenant. In November 2015, Mark Spitzer was chosen by Murdock to be the new Vice President of Operations for Castle & Cooke North Carolina. In December, Kannapolis dedicates the City Hall & Police Headquarters, a 100,000 square-foot facility standing opposite the David H. Murdock Core Laboratory, on land donated by Murdock.

BioArmor, a company that employs nanotechnology to produce hand sanitizers that do not use alcohol, leased space in the David H. Murdock Core Laboratory in 2016. Discovery MS, a non-profit research initiative housed in the David H. Murdock Research Institute, launches with an announcement of several ongoing multiple sclerosis research projects. Ei, A Pharmaceutical Solutionworks begins moving a 24-person research and development team, known as Endev Laboratories, into a 10,000-square-foot laboratory with office space on the third floor of the building.

In 2017, Ideal Health Biotechnology opened its first office at the North Carolina Research Campus. R&S Chemicals and Klear Optix join the North Carolina Research Campus. Catawba College joined in partnership with the North Carolina Research Campus to assist with marketing and business development projects. The Standard Process Center for Excellence is announced and will open in 2019 on the first floor of the laboratory building. The North Carolina Food Processing & Innovation Center, a partnership with the NC State and the NC Department of Agriculture, was announced as another tenant in the building.
