= James William Cannon =

American textiles industrialist (1852–1921)

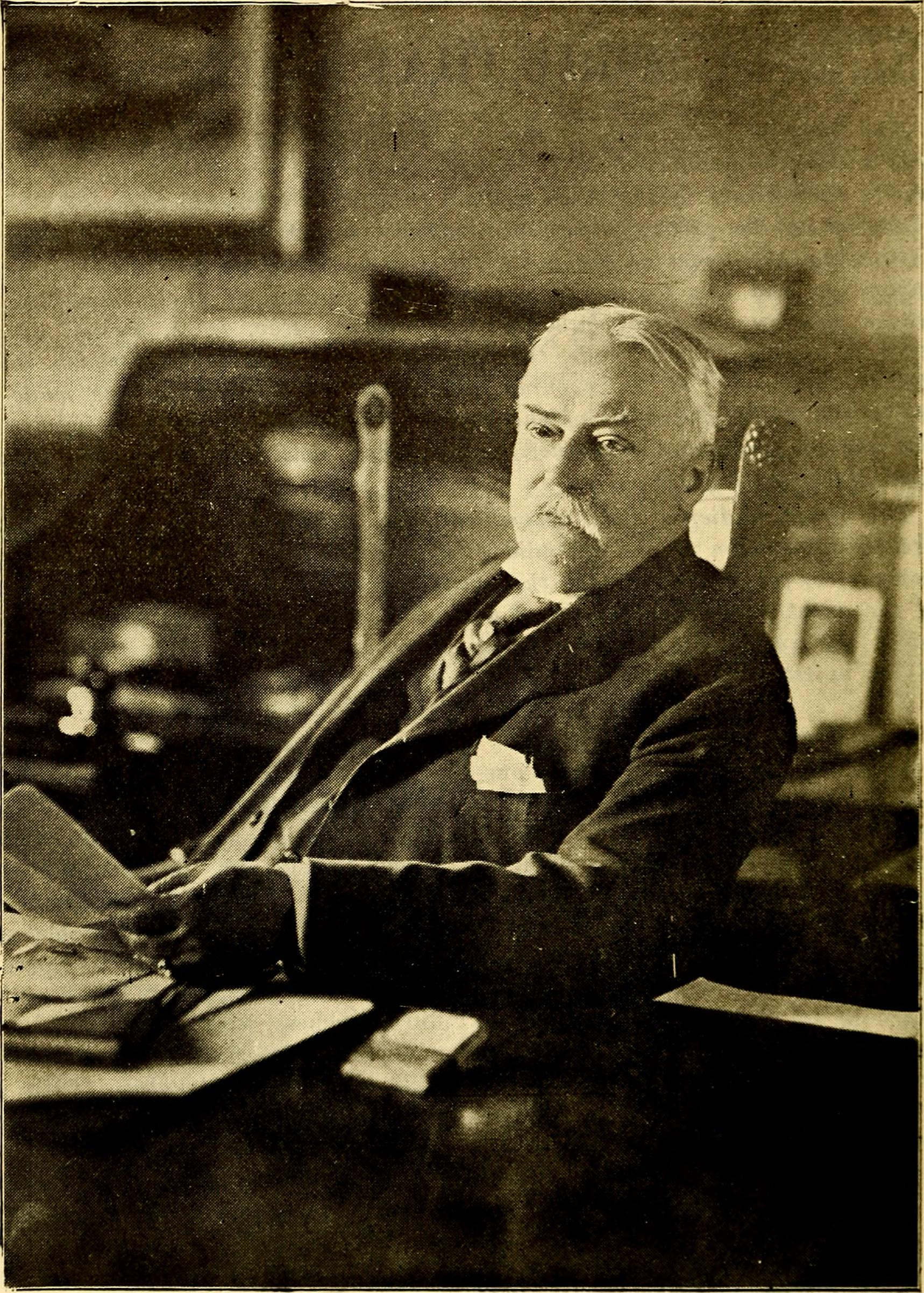
Cannon in 1909

James William Cannon (born Mecklenburg County, North Carolina April 25, 1852 – December 21, 1921) was an American industrialist, and founder of the Cannon Mills Corporation and the City of Kannapolis, North Carolina. He was the maker of the first towel ever manufactured in the South. His son was Charles Albert Cannon and his great-grandson is Robin Hayes, a former Republican congressman from North Carolina.
