= Cannon Mills =

American textile manufacturing company (1887–2003)

Cannon Mills Company
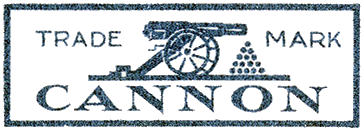

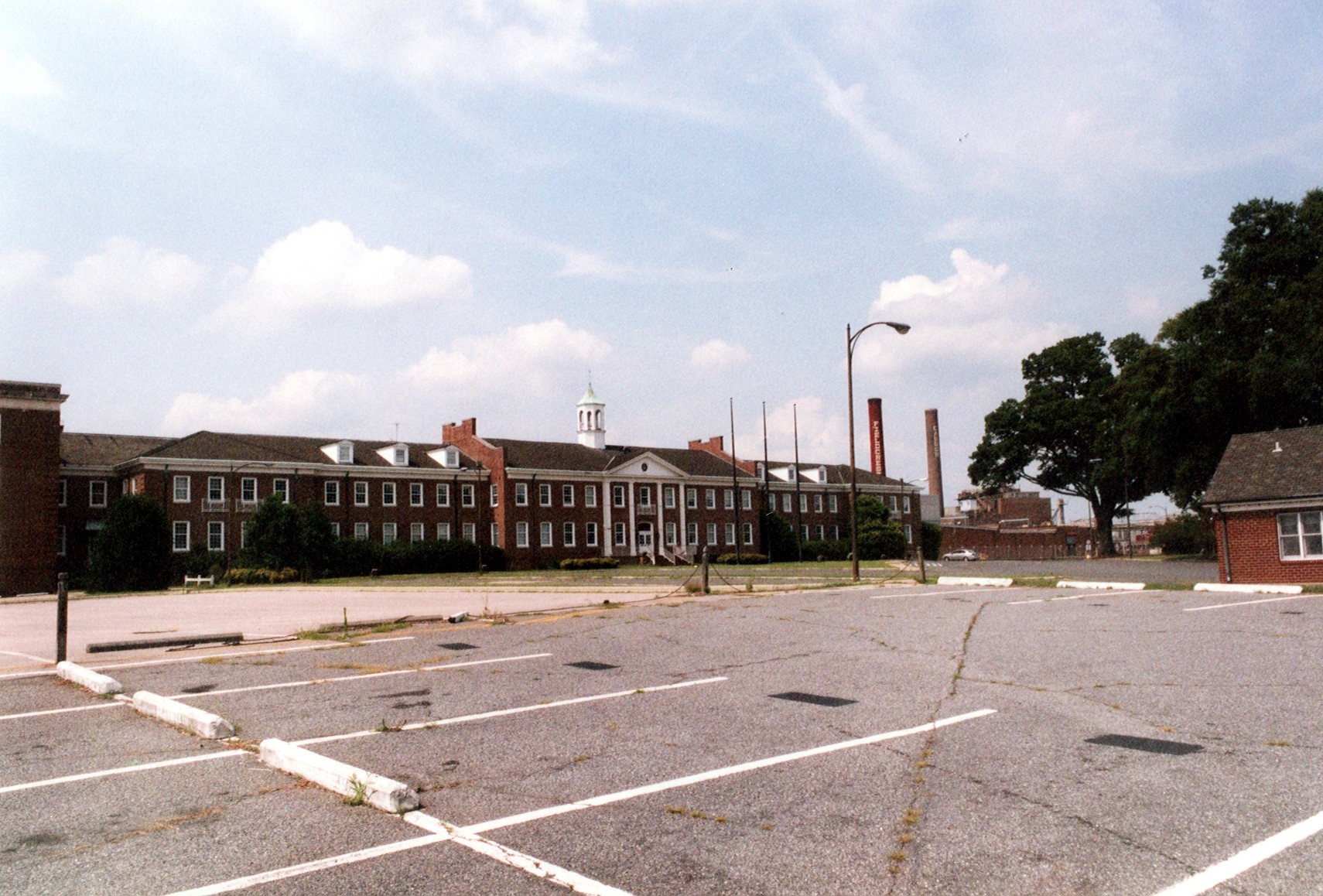
- Main offices of the Cannon headquarters, shortly before demolition in July 2005
- Formerly: Cannon Manufacturing Company (1887–1921)
- Type: Private (1888–1983)
- Industry: Textile
- Founded: 1887
- Founder: James William Cannon
- Defunct: 2003; 23 years ago
- Fate: Acquired by Fieldcrest in 1983, becoming "Fieldcrest-Cannon Corporation", sold to Pillowtex in 1997
- Successor: Fieldcrest-Cannon (1982–1997); Pillowtex Corporation (1997–2003)
- Headquarters: Kannapolis, US
- Key people: Charles A. Cannon (President, 1921–62); Donnell S Holt (President, 1962–64)
- Products: Towels, bed sheets

The Cannon Mills Company was an American textile manufacturing company based in Kannapolis, North Carolina, that mainly produced towels and bed sheets. Founded in 1887 by James William Cannon, by 1914 the company was the largest towel and sheets manufacturer in the world.

Cannon remained family-owned until 1982 when it was sold to David H. Murdock. Murdock sold the company to Fieldcrest in 1985, becoming Fieldcrest-Cannon. The company was sold to Pillowtex Corporation in 1997, which entered bankruptcy in July 2003. The remaining Cannon brands were purchased by the Iconix Brand Group.

== History ==
=== Early years and development ===
In 1887 James William Cannon founded the Cannon Manufacturing Company in Kannapolis, North Carolina. His goal was to produce a basic textile product instead of yarn or another intermediate material. His company produced towels that were sold under the brand name "Cannon Towels". Ten years later, he opened another mill in Concord, North Carolina.

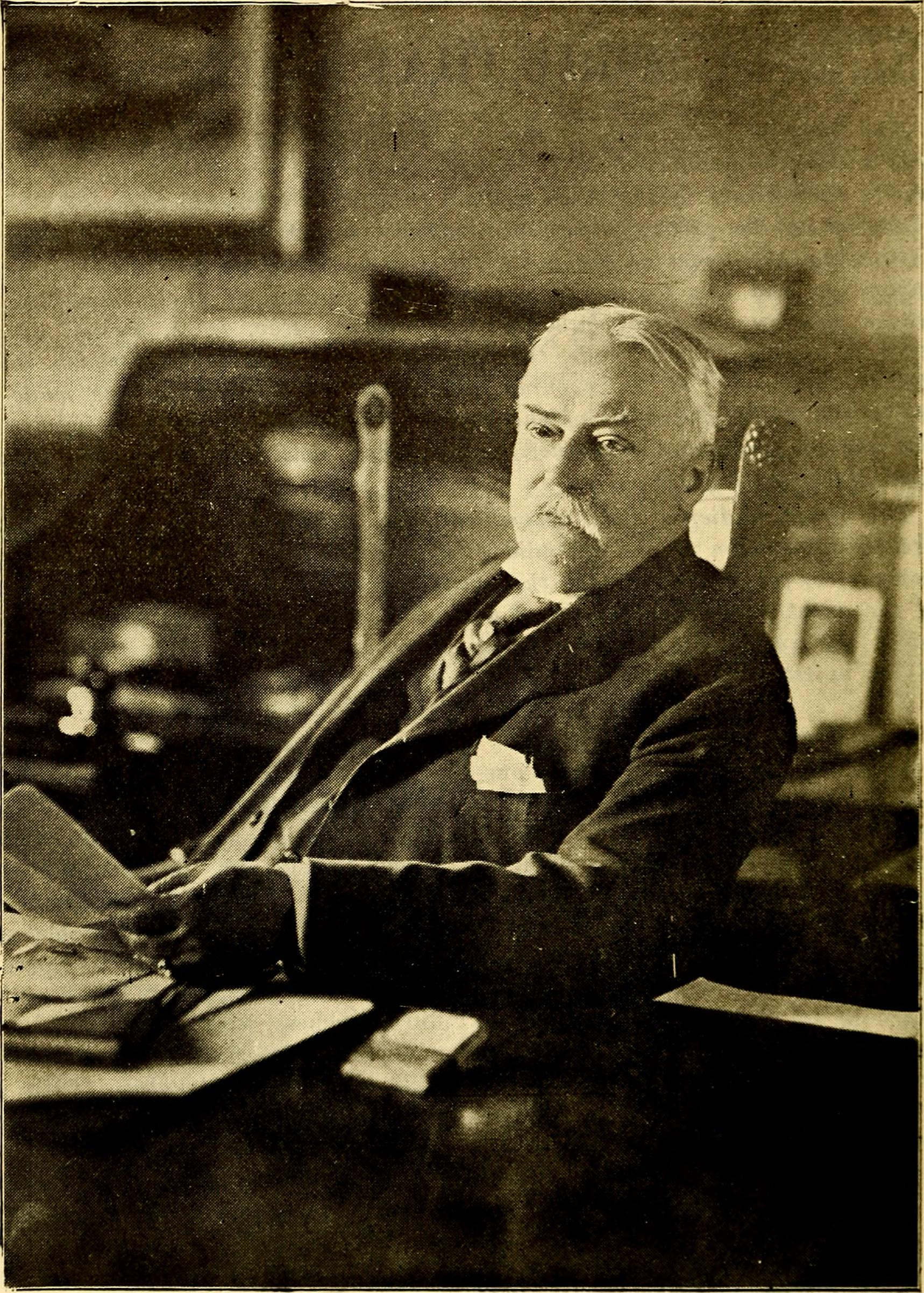
James W. Cannon, founder

In 1905, Jim Cannon designed and purchased 600 acres (2.4 km^{2}) of land in northwestern Cabarrus County, North Carolina. The land had formerly been a cotton plantation. He laid out a plan for a small mill village with homes for the workers. By 1907, the first mill was completed just west of what was Town Lake. The mill, known as Plant 1, was opened in 1908 after a brief two-year cotton shortage.

By January of 1909 the Cannon Manufacturing Company employed 840 people in its single Kannapolis plant. James William Cannon's company built hundreds of homes for the mill workers, and also built a world-class YMCA facility, which had the largest membership in the world at the time. Cannon donated land and money for school construction and education. That year, the first school, McIver was opened. Cannon erected stores, businesses, and churches. He donated funds to Cabarrus County to improve the main road leading to Kannapolis from Concord. In 1917, James Cannon arranged a life insurance policy for all Cannon employees. This had never before been done for employees of a company.

1921 was an important year for the Cannon Mills Company. A strike occurred in the localized Charlotte, North Carolina, area, affecting all textile mills in the region. Charles A. Cannon was already in charge of Cannon Mills affairs since his father was in ill health. On June 1, 1921, the members of the United Textile Workers Union of America went on strike. Although Cannon called the National Guard to "keep the peace," the strike ended because union officials left town. Cannon Mills did not unionize during this attempt, which left the World War I generation skeptical of labor unions.

J.W. Cannon was elected as chairman of the board in 1921 and his son, Charles, was made president of the Company. Later that year, Jim Cannon developed an unknown winter illness and died on December 21, 1921. He was buried at Oakwood Cemetery in downtown Concord. The Cannon Manufacturing Company was left to its president and the youngest son, Charles. By the time of J.W. Cannon's death, the population of Kannapolis was roughly 6,000 citizens and the mill had employed about 15,000 workers.

=== Golden years ===
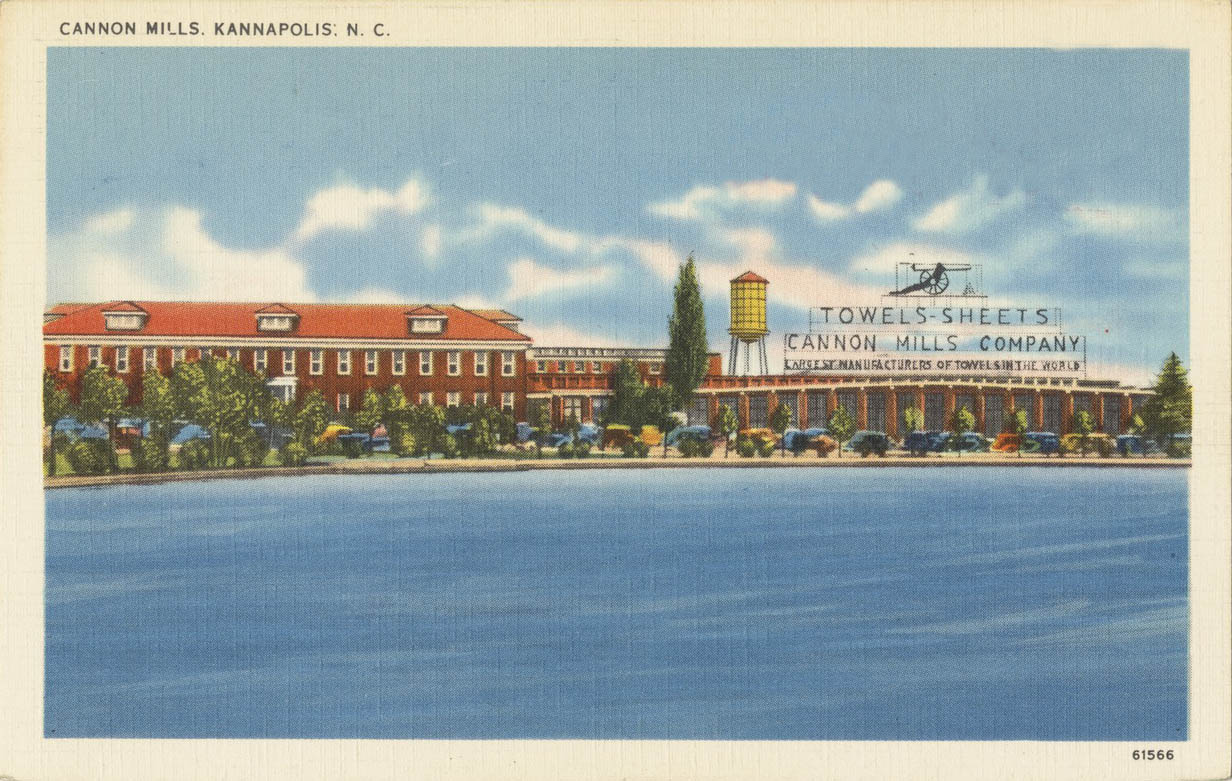
Postcard depicting the Cannon Mills headquarters in North Carolina, c. 1930–45

With Charles Albert Cannon in charge, the Cannon Mills Corporation entered its golden years. In 1924, funds and land for James William Cannon High School were donated by the company. Later in 1928, Charles Cannon organized nine textile companies into a large corporation, Cannon Mills. 300,000 towels were produced each day, and it soon became the world's largest producer of textile products. Cannon retired in 1962 at the age of seventy and was replaced as president by Donnell S Holt, moving up to chairman of the board. Sales and profit continued to rise. The one-million-square-foot towel distribution center was built in 1962 and the 840,000 sq ft (78,000 m^{2}) sheet distribution center was constructed in the early 1970s. Cannon died on April 1, 1971, of a massive stroke. Holt remained president until 1974, helping modernize the management style and fighting hard to combat negative public images of Cannon Mills.

=== Fieldcrest division of Marshall Field ===
In 1911, Marshall Field & Company, the Chicago department store, acquired seven mills in Eden, North Carolina (then known as Leaksville, Spray & Draper) from Benjamin Franklin Mebane, a local entrepreneur who had secured financing from Field's. In 1916, Field's began construction on Fieldcrest Mills in Fieldale, a 1,600-acre (6.5 km^{2}) mill town near Martinsville, Virginia, which was completed in 1919. Field's later purchased more mills to supply its retail and wholesale operation. In 1935, company chairman James O. McKinsey reorganized the firm's 24 textile mills into one manufacturing operation, called Fieldcrest, with headquarters in New York City. In 1953, Fieldcrest was spun off from Field's into a freestanding business.

=== Acquisition by Fieldcrest ===
In 1982, California billionaire David H. Murdock purchased the Cannon Mills Company and its 660 acres (2.7 km^{2}) of surrounding property. Murdock proposed a redevelopment plan to the company and the community which included the renewal of downtown Kannapolis (now Cannon Village) and the construction of a brand new YMCA. On November 6, 1984, the Town of Kannapolis was incorporated as the city of Kannapolis. Also that year the new YMCA opened. The next year, the company was bought by Eden, North Carolina-founded Fieldcrest Mills, Incorporated, for somewhat less than $250 million. This became the Fieldcrest-Cannon Corporation. The newer smokestack of Plant One, painted white since its construction in 1950, was repainted maroon, also bearing the corporate name. In September, 1997, Fieldcrest-Cannon was sold to the Pillowtex Corporation for $700 million.

Pillowtex subsequently went bankrupt in 2003 and Murdock's Castle & Cooke acquired the 264 acres (1.07 km^{2}) of land at auction for $6.4 million in December 2004. The Cannon Mills facilities were demolished in 2006.

== Legacy ==
The Cannon family donated funds for projects in the area. Such include:

- The City of Kannapolis, North Carolina
- The Cannon Memorial YMCA
- Cannon Hall, Appalachian State University
- Cannon School
- Cannon Village
- The Cannon Foundation
- Cannon Reservation, Camp John J. Barnhardt, Central NC Council Boy Scouts of America
- Charles A. Cannon Pool in the Baker Sports Complex at Davidson College, Davidson, North Carolina
- J.W. Cannon Dormitory at Davidson College
- Charlotte Country Day School's Cannon Campus
- The University of North Carolina at Charlotte's Fieldcrest Cannon Foundation Scholarship

== North Carolina Research Campus ==
The North Carolina Research Campus (NCRC) was built on the former site of the Cannon Mills Company. Construction began in 2005, and the campus opened in 2008. The NCRC is a private-public venture involving North Carolina's major universities and private investment. The NCRC is a scientific and economic revitalization project that encompasses the former Cannon Mills plant and the entire downtown area of Kannapolis, North Carolina.

== See also ==
- Kannapolis, North Carolina
- Kannapolis City Schools
- Cabarrus County, North Carolina
- North Carolina Research Campus
