= Kannapolis, North Carolina =

Kannapolis
- City
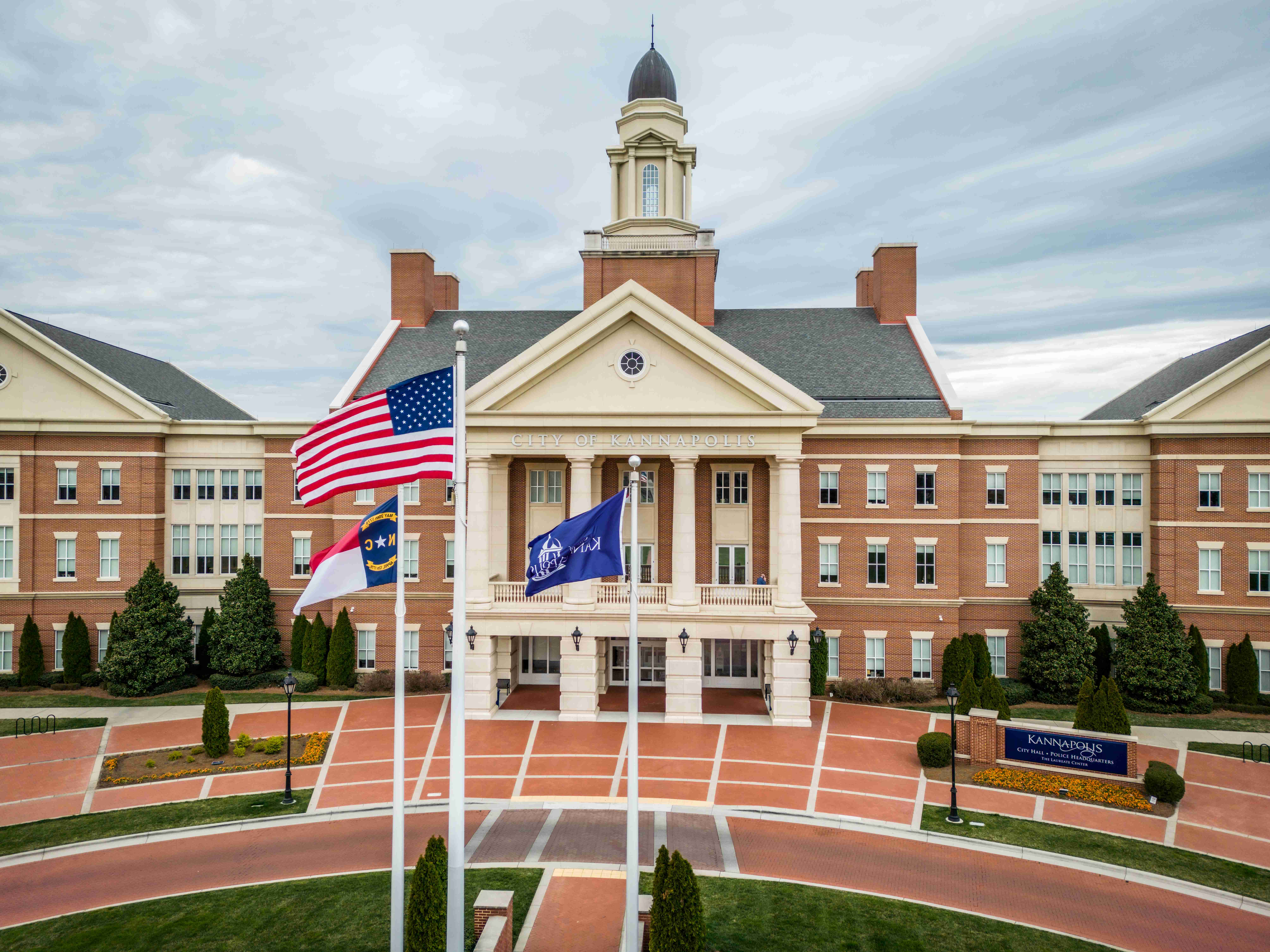
- Kannapolis City Hall

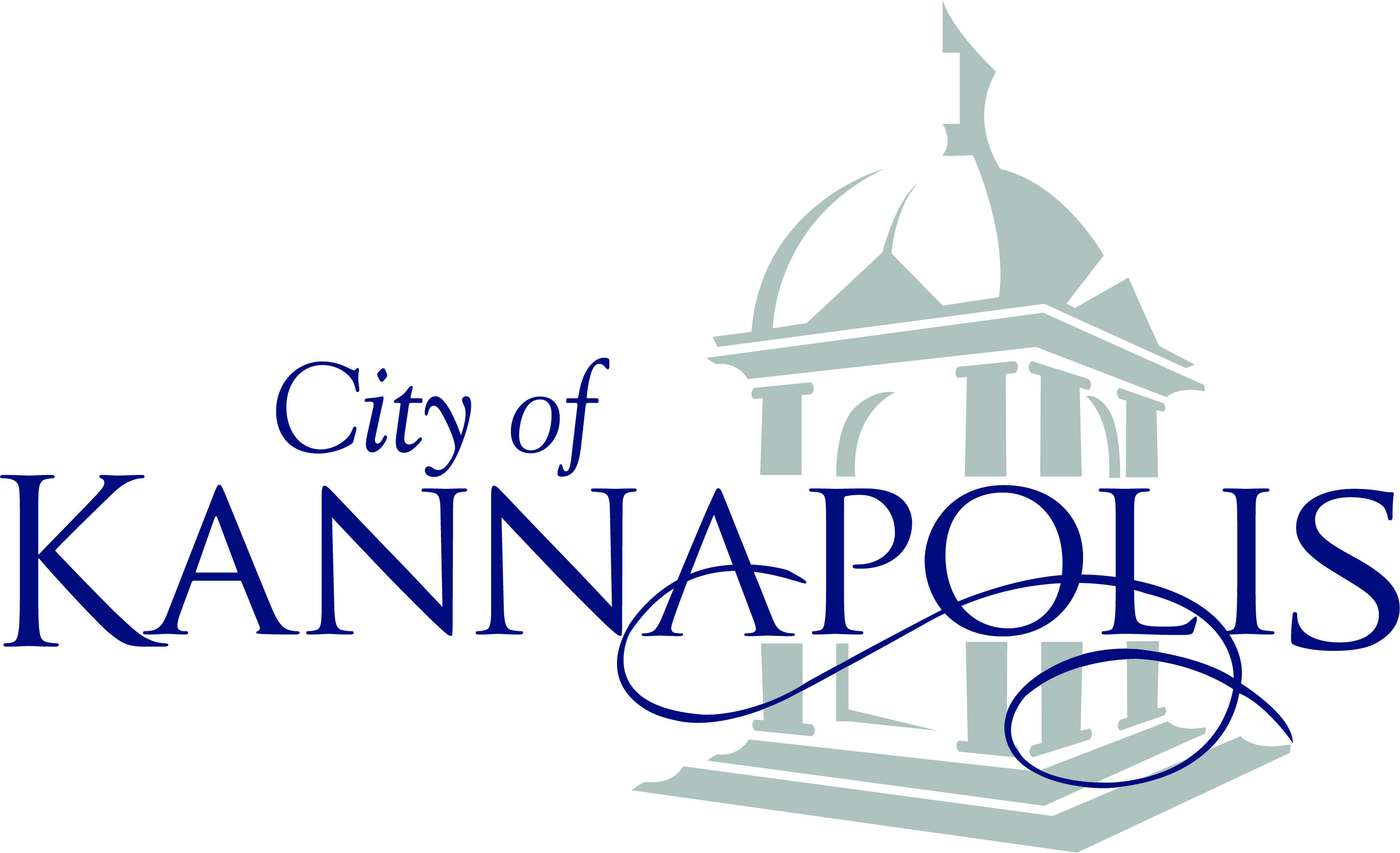
- Flag Seal
- Nickname: City of Looms
- Motto: "Imagine Kannapolis"
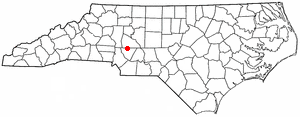
- Location in North Carolina
- Interactive map of Kannapolis
- Coordinates: 35°28′38″N 80°38′22″W
- Country: United States
- State: North Carolina
- Counties: Cabarrus and Rowan
- Founded: 1906
- Incorporated: 1984
- Named for: Cannon Mills

Government
  - Type: Council–manager
  - Mayor: Doug Wilson

Area
  - Total: 34.06 sq mi (88.22 km^{2})
  - Land: 33.50 sq mi (86.76 km^{2})
  - Water: 0.56 sq mi (1.46 km^{2}) 1.64%
- Elevation: 764 ft (233 m)

Population (2020)
  - Total: 53,114
  - Estimate (2023): 59,321
  - Density: 1,585.5/sq mi (612.18/km^{2})
- Time zone: UTC-5 (EST)
  - Summer (DST): UTC-4 (EDT)
- ZIP codes: 28081, 28082, 28083
- Area codes: 704, 980
- FIPS code: 37-35200
- GNIS feature ID: 2404816
- Website: kannapolisnc.gov

Kannapolis (/kəˈnæpəlɪs/) is a city in Cabarrus and Rowan counties in North Carolina, northwest of Concord and northeast of Charlotte, and is a suburb in the Charlotte metropolitan area. The city of Kannapolis was incorporated in 1984. The population was 53,114 at the 2020 census, which makes Kannapolis the 19th-most populous city in North Carolina. It is the home of the Kannapolis Cannon Ballers, the Low-A baseball affiliate of the Chicago White Sox, and it is the hometown of the Earnhardt racing family. It is also the headquarters for the Haas F1 racing team. The center of the city is home to the North Carolina Research Campus, a public-private venture that focuses on food, nutrition, and biotech research.

== History ==
=== Name ===
Early meaning and usage of the city's name was a direct reference to Cannon Mills Corporation, or James William Cannon himself. Early published name variations include "Cannon-opolis" and "Cannapolis". A widely accepted origin of the word "Kannapolis" comes from the combination of the Greek words kanna (reeds, not looms) and polis (city), which some believed meant "City of Looms". Dr. Gary Freeze, Catawba College history and politics department chairman, said a Concord newspaper used the name "Cannon City" in 1906. After mill workers or newspapers called the town "Cannapolis", J.W. Cannon asked Cabarrus County commissioners to give the town the name, but starting with a "K". Kannapolis historian Norris Dearmon said the K might have been to distinguish the town from his Concord mill village. Since, Freeze said, "Jim Cannon didn't study Greek," Cannon did not name the town "city of looms". In 1906 J.W. Cannon purchased the land that later became Kannapolis, and acquired a total of 1,008 acres in Cabarrus and Rowan Counties. Around 808 of those acres of farmland, purchased along the historic wagon road between Salisbury and Charlotte, became the location of the new textile mill, Cannon Manufacturing, which began production in 1908. In 1914, Cannon Manufacturing became known as the world's largest producer of sheets and towels. Shortly after, Cannon opened plants in Rowan County, Concord, and South Carolina totaling 20,000 workers. Mill founder J.W. Cannon's youngest son, Charles A. Cannon, consolidated all the separate mills into the giant Cannon Mills Company in 1928.

== Geography ==
Kannapolis is located on the boundary of Cabarrus and Rowan Counties, with a greater portion of its area in Cabarrus County. U.S. Route 29 (Cannon Boulevard) passes through the city east of the downtown area; U.S. 29 leads northeast 15 miles (24 km) to Salisbury and south 7 miles (11 km) to Concord. Interstate 85 bypasses the city on the south and the east, with access from exits 54 through 63 (five exits total). I-85 leads northeast 65 miles (105 km) to Greensboro and southwest 21 miles (34 km) to Charlotte.

According to the United States Census Bureau, the city has a total area of 34.06 square miles (88.2 km^{2}), of which 0.56 square miles (1.5 km^{2}) (1.64%) are covered by water.

== Demographics ==
Historical population
| Census | Pop. | Note | %± |
|---|---|---|---|
| 1990 | 29,696 | | — |
| 2000 | 36,910 | | 24.3% |
| 2010 | 42,625 | | 15.5% |
| 2020 | 53,114 | | 24.6% |
| 2025 (est.) | 61,708 | ▲ | 16.2% |
U.S. Decennial Census; 2020

=== 2020 census ===
As of the 2020 census, Kannapolis had a population of 53,114. The median age was 36.3 years. 25.8% of residents were under the age of 18 and 13.3% of residents were 65 years of age or older. For every 100 females there were 92.2 males, and for every 100 females age 18 and over there were 88.2 males age 18 and over.

97.8% of residents lived in urban areas, while 2.2% lived in rural areas.

There were 20,313 households, including 12,092 families, of which 35.7% had children under the age of 18 living in them. Of all households, 44.3% were married-couple households, 17.5% were households with a male householder and no spouse or partner present, and 30.5% were households with a female householder and no spouse or partner present. About 25.6% of all households were made up of individuals and 9.8% had someone living alone who was 65 years of age or older.

There were 21,963 housing units, of which 7.5% were vacant. The homeowner vacancy rate was 1.6% and the rental vacancy rate was 6.2%.

Racial composition as of the 2020 census
| Race | Number | Percent |
|---|---|---|
| White | 30,191 | 56.8% |
| Black or African American | 11,853 | 22.3% |
| American Indian and Alaska Native | 331 | 0.6% |
| Asian | 1,312 | 2.5% |
| Native Hawaiian and Other Pacific Islander | 25 | 0.0% |
| Some other race | 4,875 | 9.2% |
| Two or more races | 4,527 | 8.5% |
| Hispanic or Latino (of any race) | 8,462 | 15.9% |

=== 2000 census ===
At the 2000 census, 36,910 people, 14,804 households, and 10,140 families lived in the city. The population density was 1,236.5 people per square mile (477.4 people/km^{2}). The 15,941 housing units had an average density of 534.0 per square mile (206.2/km^{2}). The racial makeup of the city was 77.74% White, 16.45% Black or African American, 0.86% Asian American, 0.34% Native American, 0.01% Native Hawaiian or other Pacific Islander, 3.43% some other race, and 1.16% two or more races. About 6.33% were Hispanic or Latino people of any race,

Of the 14,804 households, 30.0% had children under 18 living with them, 50.4% were married couples living together, 13.5% had a female householder with no husband present, and 31.5% were not families. About 26.5% of all households were made up of individuals, and 11.4% had someone living alone who was 65 or older. The average household size was 2.46 and the average family size was 2.96.

In the city, the age distribution was 24.2% under 18, 9.0% from 18 to 24, 30.4% from 25 to 44, 20.8% from 45 to 64, and 15.6% who were 65 or older. The median age was 36 years. For every 100 females, there were 93.7 males. For every 100 females 18 and over, there were 90.0 males.

The median income for a household in the city was $35,532, and for a family was $42,445. Males had a median income of $30,990 versus $23,277 for females. The per capita income for the city was $17,539. About 7.7% of families and 10.5% of the population were below the poverty line, including 14.6% of those under age 18 and 10.7% of those age 65 or over.

== Arts and culture ==
=== National Register of Historic Places ===
The Gem Theater, Meek House, and Harvey Jeremiah Peeler House are listed on the National Register of Historic Places.

=== Museums ===
- Curb Museum for Music and Motorsports

== Sports ==
- Kannapolis Cannon Ballers, Class "A" baseball affiliate of the Chicago White Sox
- Haas Factory Team, a NASCAR Cup Series team established by Gene Haas
- Haas F1 Team, a Formula One team, also established by Gene Haas

== Parks and recreation ==
=== Public ===
Kannapolis has several public recreational areas, including parks, athletic fields, and greenways. One public park in the city, Vietnam Veterans Park (formerly, North Cabarrus Park) is maintained and operated by Cabarrus County.

- Bakers Creek Park
- Dale Earnhardt Plaza
- Veterans Park
- Village Park
- Walter M. Safrit Park

=== Private ===
- The Club at Irish Creek (formerly, Kannapolis Country Club)
- Kannapolis Recreation Park

== Education ==
=== K–12 ===
The Kannapolis City Schools system is the primary school system for the city. Two additional systems also serve its jurisdiction: Cabarrus County Schools and Rowan–Salisbury School System.

Faith Christian Academy (FCA) is a private, nonprofit Christian educational institution that is operated by Faith Baptist Church. FCA offers a combination of the A Beka program (K5–2nd grade) and the Alpha-Omega computerized, individual learning program (3rd–12th grade). FCA was organized in 1982.

Franklin Heights Christian Academy (FHCA) was a private, nonprofit Christian educational institution that was operated by Franklin Heights Baptist Church. FHCA was organized in 2009. This school is now closed.

=== Higher education ===
Shaw University has an extramural site in Kannapolis offering undergraduate, graduate, and continuing-educational programs.

Ambassador Christian College has a campus in Kannapolis offering undergraduate and graduate degrees in theology. The school was founded in 2003 by Dr. Keith Slough.

=== North Carolina Research Campus ===
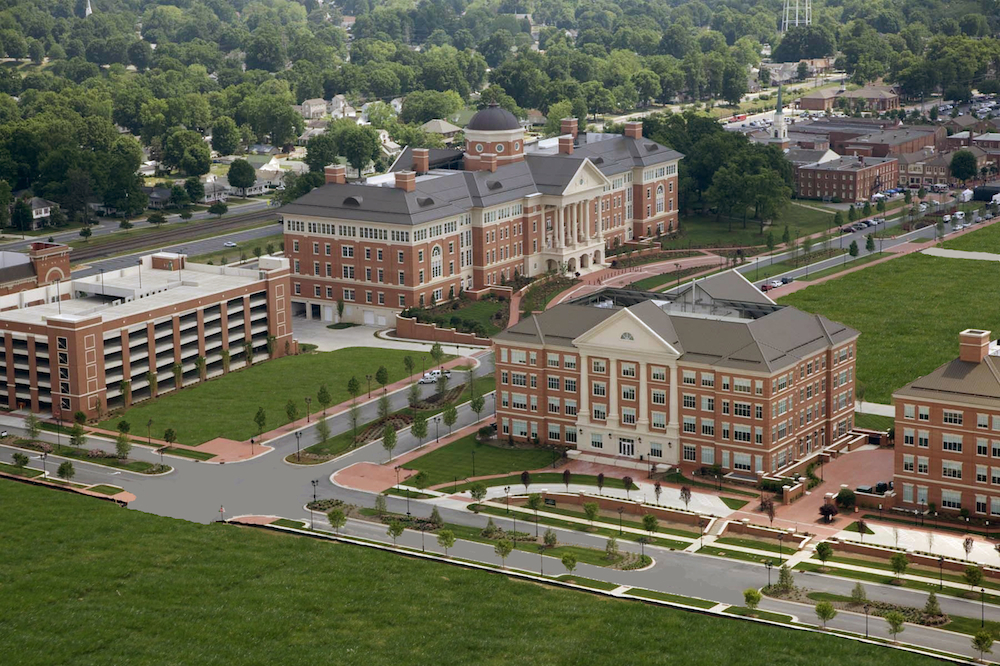
Aerial image of the North Carolina Research Campus

The North Carolina Research Campus in Kannapolis is a 350-acre (140 ha) research center.

== Infrastructure ==
=== Transportation ===
Kannapolis is located adjacent to Interstate 85, about 20 miles (32 km) northeast of Charlotte.

Concord Kannapolis Area Transit, also known as Rider, provides multiple local bus routes, with its farthest point reaching Concord Mills Mall.

Charlotte Area Transit System (CATS) provides multiple transportation options including bus, vanpool or carpool. CATS provides a bus stop and parking at Kannapolis' Home Depot parking lot.

The Kannapolis Amtrak station is located at 201 South Main Street.

== Notable people ==
- Tavis Bailey, Olympic discus thrower representing Team USA, competed at the 2016 Summer Olympics
- George Clinton, leader of Parliament-Funkadelic
- Dale Earnhardt, former driver, seven-time NASCAR Cup Series champion, member of the NASCAR Hall of Fame
- Dale Earnhardt Jr., former NASCAR driver, member of the NASCAR Hall of Fame
- Kelley Earnhardt Miller, businesswoman and vice president of JR Motorsports
- Kerry Earnhardt, former NASCAR driver
- Ralph Earnhardt, former NASCAR driver
- Carl Ford, member of the North Carolina Senate
- Daniel Hemric, current NASCAR driver
- Ethan Horton, former NFL tight end
- Skip Hollandsworth, writer
- Argie Johnson, educator
- Kameron Marlowe, country music singer-songwriter
- Glenn McDuffie, retired World War II sailor, picture subject of V-J Day in Times Square
- James McDuffie, North Carolina Senator
- Eddie Mills, actor
- Melissa Morrison-Howard, track hurdler and winner of two Olympic bronze medals
- Mike Morton, NFL linebacker, Super Bowl XXXIV champion with the St. Louis Rams
- Brandon Parker, NFL offensive tackle
- Corey Seager, MLB shortstop, 2020 World Series champion and MVP for the Los Angeles Dodgers
- Kyle Seager, MLB third baseman
- George Shinn, former owner of the Charlotte Hornets
- Haskel Stanback, former NFL running back
- Dixie Upright, former MLB player
- Jeffery Beam, gay male poet

== In popular culture ==
In 2004, a silent film about Kannapolis, showing the everyday behavior of ordinary people, which was made in 1941 by itinerant filmmaker H. Lee Waters, was selected by the Library of Congress for listing in the United States National Film Registry, as a representative of this kind of filmed "town portrait" popular in the 1930s and 1940s.

== See also ==
- List of municipalities in North Carolina
