= Savoyard–Waldensian wars =

Series of conflicts

- Part of the European wars of religion
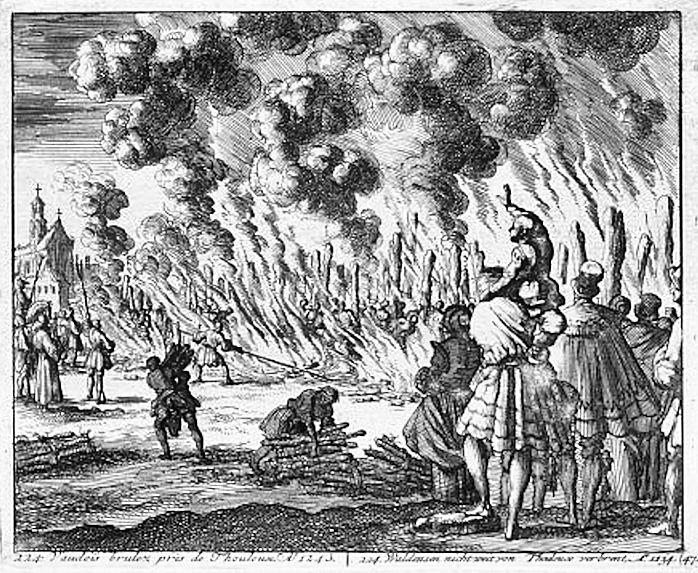
Date	24 April 1655 – 4 June 1690
Location	Piedmont, Duchy of Savoy
Result	Status quo

Belligerents
Duchy of Savoy; Kingdom of France (1686–1690)	Waldensian rebels

Commanders and leaders
Charles Emmanuel II; Victor Amadeus II; Nicolas Catinat	Joshua Janavel; Jean Léger; Bartolomeo Jahier; Henri Arnaud

Strength
4,500 Savoyard troops (1686); 4,000 French regulars (1686)	

The Savoyard–Waldensian wars were a series of conflicts between the community of Waldensians (also known as Vaudois) and the Savoyard troops in the Duchy of Savoy from 1655 to 1690. The Piedmontese Easter in 1655 sparked the conflict. It was largely a period of persecution of the Waldensian Church, rather than a military conflict. Joshua Janavel (1617–1690) was one of the Waldensian military leaders against the Savoyard ducal troops.

== Background ==
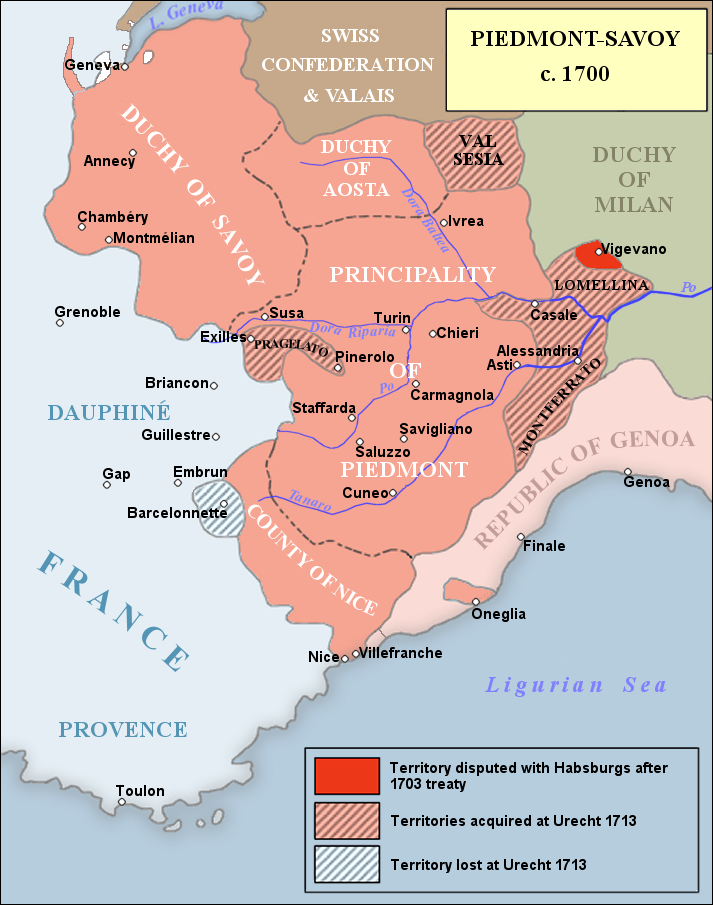
Duchy of Savoy (1700) including Piedmont.

A previous war between Emmanuel Philibert, Duke of Savoy and his Waldensian subjects raged from 1560 to 1561, beginning when the duke ordered all Protestants in his domain to revert to Catholicism. The duke had been forced to implement this policy by signing the Peace of Cateau-Cambrésis (1559). The Waldensians petitioned him, saying they had always stayed loyal to him and that their religion was the same as Jesus Christ originally taught it, and swore to become Catholics if their theology could be disproven in a debate. For months the duke did not respond to the petition, while tensions between his Catholic noblemen and Waldensian peasants rose and eventually escalated to violence on 4 April 1560, and would only cease on 5 July 1561 when the Peace of Cavour was concluded between them.

Alexis Muston, a 19th-century French Protestant pastor based in Bordeaux, claimed in L'Israel des Alpes (Paris 1852) that neither Duke Charles Emmanuel II of Savoy nor the Waldensians themselves had sought to wage war, and both parties were content with maintaining the peace. It was due to the constant pressure exerted by New Council of Propagation of the Faith and the Extermination of Heresy (Concilium Novum de Propaganda Fide et Extirpandis Haereticis), an institution of the Roman Catholic Church established in Turin in 1650, that regularly convened in the palace of the Archbishop of Turin.

Although the Waldensian population (numbering around 15,000 in 1685) in certain areas of Piedmont had held privileges of tolerance and freedom of belief and conscience for centuries that were written down in several documents, these long-established rights for Protestant Italians were being violated by new decrees passed by Andrea Gastaldo, member of the council. Two decrees in particular threatened the continued existence of Waldensian communities in Piedmont: the Edict of 15 May 1650, abrogating the old Waldensian privileges, and the Edict of 25 January 1655, which was in fact a religious expulsion order:

That every head of a family, with the individuals of that family, of the reformed religion, of what rank, degree, or condition soever, none excepted inhabiting and possessing estates in Lucerne, St. Giovanni, Bibiana, Campiglione, St. Secondo, Lucernetta, La Torre, Fenile and Bricherassio, should, within three days after the publication thereof, withdraw and depart, and be withdrawn out of the said places, and translated into the places and limits tolerated by his highness during his pleasure; particularly Bobbio, Angrogne, Vilario, Rorata, and the county of Bonetti. And all this to be done on pain of death, and confiscation of house and goods, unless within the limited time they turned Roman Catholics.

== Events ==
=== Piedmontese Easter ===
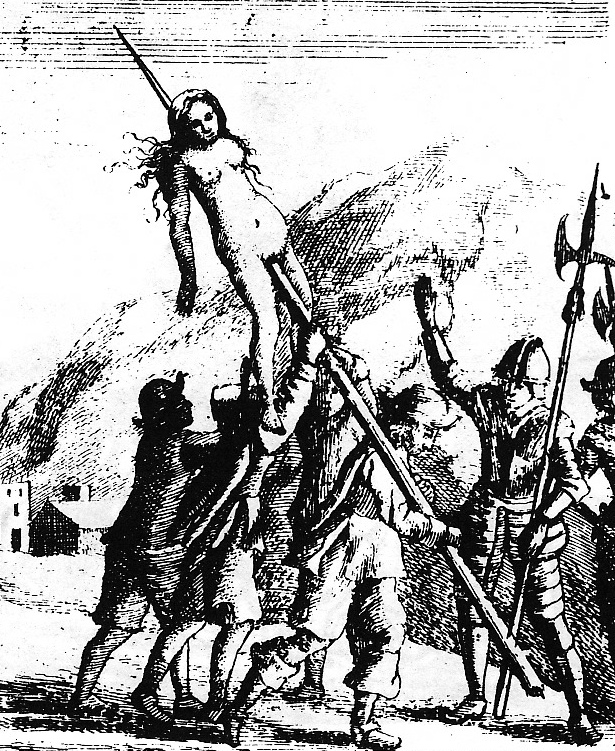
A young woman, said by the artist to be Anna, the daughter of Giovanni Charboniere of La Torre, being impaled by Savoyan soldiers.

The Waldensian refusal to obey the Edict of 25 January 1655 led the government to send troops to plunder and burn Waldensian houses, and to station over 15,000 soldiers in their valleys. On 24 April 1655, the Piedmontese Easter commenced: a massacre of 4,000 to 6,000 Waldensian civilians was committed by ducal troops. This caused a mass exodus of Waldensian refugees to the Valley of Perosa (Pérouse), and led to the formation of rebel groups under the leadership of Joshua Janavel, Jean Léger and Bartolomeo Jahier, whilst several states including England, France, Germany and the Protestant cantons of Switzerland attempted to intervene diplomatically. On 18 August, the Pirenolo Declaration of Mercy was issued, which constituted a peace treaty between Charles Emmanuel II and the Waldensians.

=== War of the Banished ===
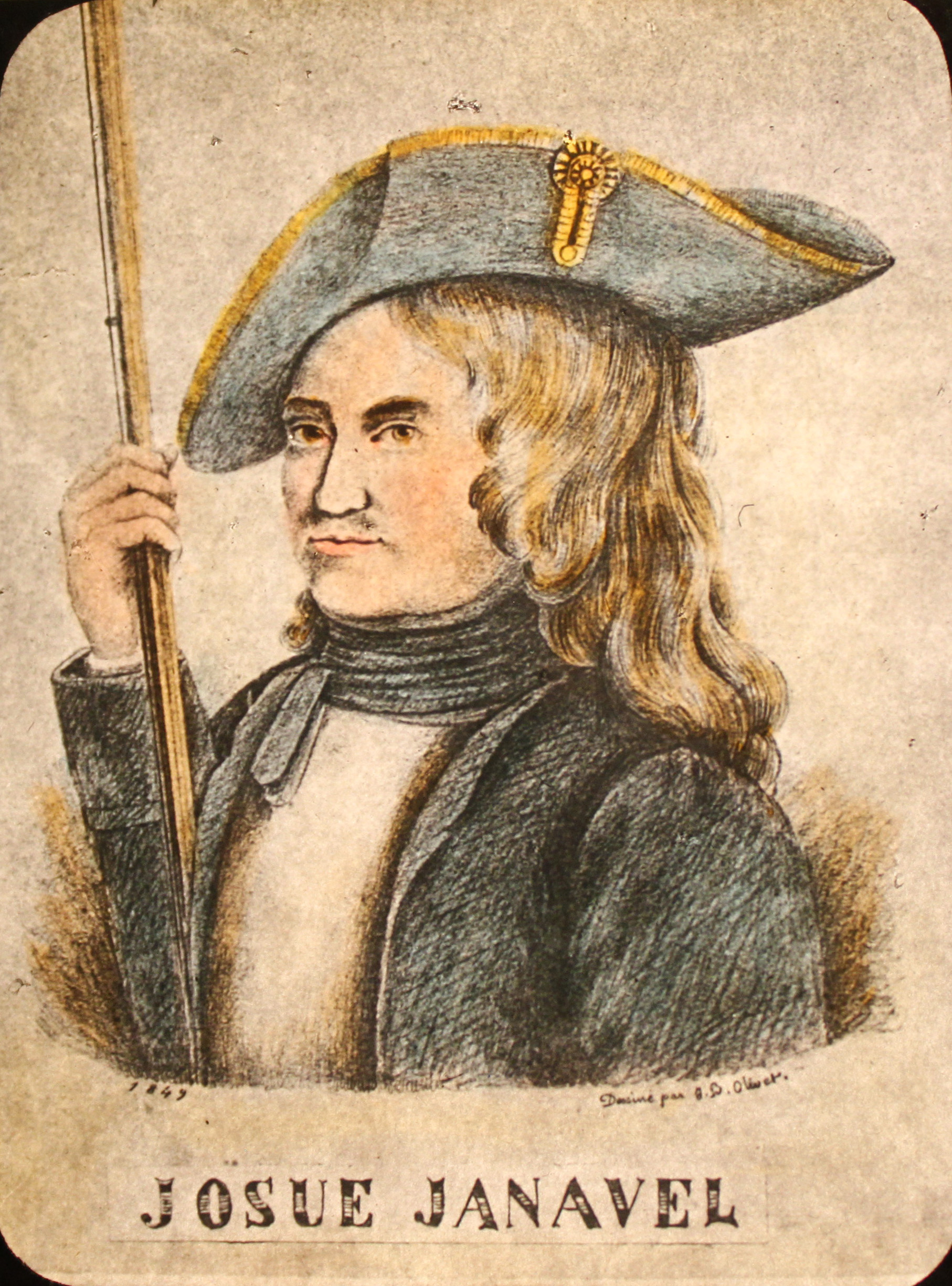
An 1895 portrait of Joshua Janavel.

In 1661, the Savoyard government proclaimed that Jean Léger should be put to death, thereby violating the Pinerolo peace agreement. Ducal troops once again occupied the valleys in 1663 and persecuted the Waldensians. The rebels under Janavel waged a guerrilla war against the Savoyard soldiers known as the "War of the Banished", and managed to emerge victorious. On 14 February 1664, the Peace Treaty of Turin was signed, but Léger, Janavel and 26 other Waldensians were not granted amnesty for their part in the uprising.

=== Time of peace ===
From 1664 to 1684, there was a period of peace and tranquility for the Savoyard Waldensians. Nevertheless, Léger went into exile to Leiden in the Dutch Republic, where he published his book Histoire générale des Églises évangéliques des vallées du Piémont ou vaudoises ("General History of the Evangelical Churches of the Piedmontese or Waldensian Valleys", 1669).

=== Renewed persecution and war ===
In 1685, King Louis XIV of France rescinded the Edict of Nantes and started purging the Val Chisone of Waldensians, forcefully converting the inhabitants to Catholicism. Pressured by Louis XIV, the new duke Victor Amadeus II decreed an Edict on 31 January 1686 prohibiting the Reformed religion in all of Savoy. Waldensians under pastor Henri Arnaud resisted the ban, and on 22 April a new war broke out.

The Waldensians had about 3,000 rebel soldiers at their disposal, which sought to protect around 12,000 non-combatants (mainly women and children). The ducal troops numbered around 4,500, aided by thousands of local militiamen and 4,000 French regulars under marshal Nicolas Catinat. On 22 May, Victor Amadeus marched his forces from the Bricherasio plain towards the valleys, while the French troops flanked the Waldensians from the French fortress at Pinerolo up the Val Chisone. All organised resistance was crushed within three days. About 2,000 Waldensians were killed in the fighting or massacred afterwards, almost all others were taken prisoner and abducted to Turin. Some 3,000 survivors, mostly children, were forcibly converted to Catholicism through baptism and placed in Catholic homes. The remainder of about 8,500 prisoners were incarcerated in several fortresses. Only 3,841 of them had survived by the time they were released in March 1687. About one third of the Waldensian population of the Val Pragela fled to Graubünden in Switzerland or to Germany between 1685 and 1687. A small number of rebels continued fighting until June, and raids continued until November. The valleys, which were only inhabited by about 2,500 of pre-1686 converts to Catholicism, were resettled by Catholic Savoyard subjects from elsewhere in the summer of 1686 as part of a government colonisation programme to confiscate and resell the Waldensian properties.

The few Waldensians that were not defeated yet, were granted a free pass to Switzerland on 17 October 1686. The duke also promised to release the prisoners, and to return the forcefully Catholicised children back to their Waldensian families. On 3 January 1687, the released prisoners were granted permission to leave the country, but only 2565 reached Geneva. Many Waldensian refugees resided in Brandenburg, Württemberg, Hesse and the Palatinate from 1687 to 1689.

When the Nine Years' War broke out in September 1688, Victor Amadeus II gradually took the side of the anti-French Grand Alliance (League of Augsburg), although he would not formally accede to the coalition until June 1690. Due to his intentions to ally himself with the Protestant-dominated Dutch Republic and England (which was undergoing the Dutch Protestant-led Glorious Revolution), he was put under pressure to cease his persecutions of the Protestant Waldensians from 1688.

=== Glorious Return ===
Waldensian rebel commander Henri Arnaud led the Glorious Return.

The Genevan Waldensian exiles formed a rebel army of about 900 men under leadership of Henri Arnaud in the summer of 1689, with the objective of returning home and retaking possession of their valleys. On 16 August O.S. or 26 August N.S. they departed from Switzerland first with boats across Lake Geneva, and then on a 200 kilometre march over hills and mountains towards Piedmont. This event is known as the "Glorious Return" (French: Glorieuse Rentrée), a name inspired by the recent Glorious Revolution on the British Isles. Due to hardships during the journey, the Waldensians and a number of Huguenot refugees that were with them suffered many losses. A battle with French troops blocking their way took place at Salbertrand; the Protestants defeated them and reached their valleys on 6 September. Farms of the new Catholic settlers in the area were plundered, ducal patrols were ambushed. The Glorious Return, which had been planned for years, was a great success, despite the small numbers and heavy casualties.

Louis XIV was alarmed by the surprise attack, fearing this would encourage new Huguenot rebellions at the borders and inside France. Indeed, in autumn 1689, several bands of Protestants invaded the Dauphiné to incite revolts, but they did not succeed. Louis XIV determined it was time to crush the Waldensians once and for all, demanding Victor Amadeus' cooperation whose loyalty he felt was starting to fail him. At first, the duke and the king did work together in clearing the Val Pellice and Val di Luserne of Protestant rebels, and surrounded them at their stronghold at the border village of Balsiglia (Balziglia). However, when winter set on in late November and heavy snow started to fall, the campaign season was over and the Franco–Savoyard advance stalled.

Victor Amadeus requested several times that the Waldensians would pack up and leave his domain again without being attacked, but this offer was refused. He also entered into negotiations with the Swiss cantons for military aid in exchange for leniency towards the Waldensians, and considering allying himself with William III of Orange, now Protestant king of England and stadtholder in most provinces of the Dutch Republic. The eventual break between France and Savoy was caused by the latter's cooperation with Leopold I, Holy Roman Emperor in February 1690.

=== Renversement des alliances ===
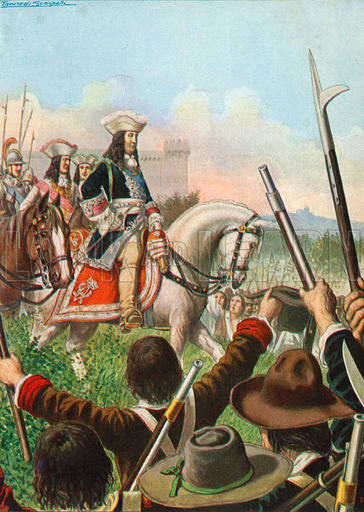
Victor Amadeus declares war on France; his subjects cheer. 1929 image.

To teach the duke a lesson, Louis moved to finish the Waldensians himself, thereby violating Savoy's territory. He planned to occupy Piedmont, and used the Waldensian insurrection and the hostile Duchy of Milan (a Spanish possession east of Savoy) as an excuse. On 2 May 1690, a group of 300 Waldensian soldiers were surrounded by 4,000 French dragoons led by Nicolas Catinat near Balsiglia. The three hundred managed to escape when thick mist appeared at night. On the same day, Louis found out Victor Amadeus' secret plans for an alliance with the Emperor and Spain, and instructed Catinat to present the duke with an ultimatum to allow French troops passage through Piedmont to attack Spanish forces in Lombardy (Milan). Catinat received this order on 6 May, left most of his troops to besiege Balsiglia and visited the duke in the capital city of Turin to demand a free pass.

Victor Amadeus was trying to buy time to switch alliances and to get Spain, the Emperor, William III, the Protestant Swiss cantons and the Waldensian troops on his side in exchange for freedom of worship in their valleys according to their old privileges. On 9 May, he granted Catinat's demand for passage through Savoyard territory, but was also withdrawing his soldiers from the Waldensian valleys and secretly preparing his capital for a French siege. Catinat realised the duke was trying to betray him, advanced his army further, and on 20 May, acting on fresh orders of the French king, demanded that Victor Amadeus hand over the citadel of Turin and the fort of Verrua. The duke responded that he would, but again tried to buy more time.

On 28 May he signed a truce with the Waldensian rebels, and made plans for a joint attack on the French invaders. On 3 June, he concluded an alliance with Spain through Fuensalida, the Spanish governor of Milan. On 4 June, he formed an alliance with the Emperor through his Imperial envoys. The same day, he formally declared war on France to French ambassador Rébenac in Turin, which was received with enthusiastic support from his notables at the ducal palace. Savoy formally joined the League of Augsburg against France. Also on 4 June, Victor Amadeus II recalled the Waldensians from abroad back home to Piedmont; the vast majority did indeed return to their valleys in northwestern Italy.

Duke Victor Amadeus's June 1690 defection to the League of Augsburg effectively put an end to the Savoyard–Waldensian wars, as the duchy once again tolerated the presence of Protestant subjects on its territory, and protected them against the persecuting French troops invading Piedmont.

== Aftermath ==
It was not until 23 May 1694 that the duke officially annulled the 1686 edicts of persecution with the Edict of Reintegration, allowing the Waldensians to live undisturbed in their old places of residence. This was not to last long, however. On 29 June 1696, Savoy concluded a separate peace with France, under the conditions that the Val Perouse would become Savoyard territory only if no Protestants were allowed to live in it, and all Reformed Christians born in France would be expelled from the Duchy of Savoy-Piedmont. Two years later, on 1 July 1698, Victor Amadeus issued an edict expelling all French-born Protestants from Savoy-Piedmont, which forced about 3,000 of them to leave the Waldensian valleys over the next two months.
