= Dorking Caves =

Tunnels in Dorking, Surrey, England

Coordinates: 51.2305°N 0.3343°W

The Dorking Caves are a network of manmade tunnels excavated in the soft sandstone of the Upper Greensand deposits beneath Dorking in Surrey, England.

== Location and layout ==
The present entrance to the caves is in South Street in the centre of Dorking.

There is evidence of a number of original entrances to the caves, including two shafts, but all with the exception of the South Street entrance have been sealed. The upper level of the caves is laid out as a wine cellar and was last used for this purpose in the 19th century. In the centre of the upper level is a set of steps leading down to a landing, from which leads a further set of steps to a lower passage. At the far end of this passage is a circular room with a bench cut out of the rock.

== History ==
The Dorking 'caves' are tunnels, being manmade and as such not caves in the true sense of the word (a natural underground/cliff-side space large enough for a human to enter). Dorking Caves is a long-used name and the one used in all promotional and official literature.

The exact age of the caves is unknown. Historian John Aubrey mentioned them in the late 17th century, praising their qualities as wine cellars, in which capacity parts of them served until the 19th century. Extensive graffiti adorns the caves, largely from the 18th and 19th centuries. The oldest date found inscribed on the walls is 1672.

The caves formed a network connecting the cellars of buildings around the town and were probably used initially for storage, but have had a variety of uses including as hiding places for smugglers' contraband. One cave in High Street provided a venue for cock fighting while others according to recent oral tradition were used as a hiding places by persecuted religious groups (see European Wars of Religion) and secret societies.

== Access ==
The caves are open to the public during the summer with tours organised by Dorking Museum. Prince Edward, Earl of Wessex, formally re-opened the caves to the public on his visit to the town on 11 March 2015.
