= Rorà =

- Comune
- Comune di Rorà
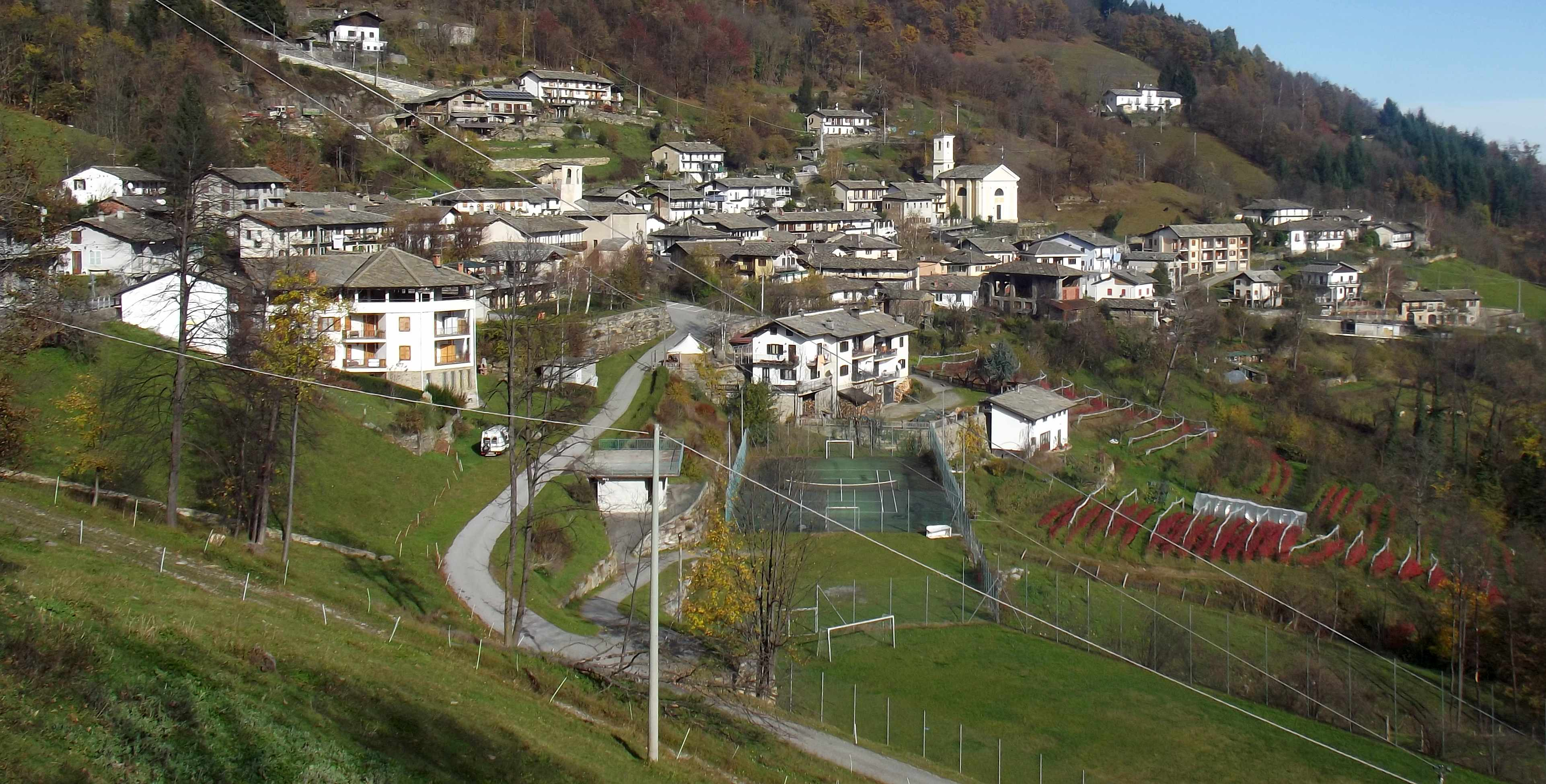

- Coat of arms

- Location within Italy Location within Piedmont
- Coordinates: 44°48′N 7°12′E
- Country: Italy
- Region: Piedmont
- Metropolitan city: Turin (TO)
- Frazioni: Ruà

Government
  - Mayor: Claudia Bertinat

Area
  - Total: 12.41 km^{2} (4.79 sq mi)
- Elevation: 967 m (3,173 ft)

Population (31 December 2016)
  - Total: 251
  - Density: 20.2/km^{2} (52.4/sq mi)
- Demonym: Rorenghi
- Time zone: UTC+1 (CET)
  - Summer (DST): UTC+2 (CEST)
- Postal code: 10060
- Dialing code: 0121

Rorà is a comune (municipality) in the Metropolitan City of Turin in the Italian region Piedmont, located about 50 km southwest of Turin

Situated 5 km from Luserna San Giovanni, the small center of Rorà lies at the foot of Mount Frioland in the upper valley of the river Luserna.

In its territory are the quarries that since antiquity were used to extract the renowned Luserna stone, and the houses of the village shows beautiful walls made with this stone.

It was the scene of several campaigns against the Waldensians and is historically linked to Joshua Janavel. Nearby Torre Pellice is the center of the Waldensian church.

Rorà borders the following municipalities: Villar Pellice, Torre Pellice, Luserna San Giovanni, and Bagnolo Piemonte.

== History ==
Rorà is the transcription of the ancient name of the village, which means oakwood (from rou, oak), alluding to the woods that once covered the valley. The existence of a municipal organization with delimitation of borders (still substantially unchanged) is attested by a document dated 1251. Its history is similar to all the mountain villages of Piedmont: initially was a fief of a noble family (Luserna), later a free community.

The history of Rorà is also characterized (as well as several surrounding municipalities, part of the so-called Waldensian valleys) by the presence of the Waldensians, a religious movement born in the twelfth century in Lyon from the story of Valdo (hence the name), a merchant who abandoned all their own belongings to follow the teaching of Christ. His movement, similar in some ways to the one of St. Francis, was however excommunicated by the Roman Church.

In the sixteenth century the Waldensians joined the Protestant Reformation, organizing their communities on the Calvinist model. So they were then victims of legal discrimination, incarcerations, violence, risking to disappear. On April 24(Easter Eve), in the morning, Savoy army led by the Marquis of Pianezza attacked the population without any warning, thus revealing his mission: to quickly and brutally erase Waldensian faith. Many people died in Pellice Valley in that massacre that is still known nowadays as “Piedmontese Easters”. Rorà was defended by Joshua Janavel and his fellows. In 1686 there was a new persecution, many were deported and imprisoned, or exiled to Switzerland, and returned three years later (known as the Glorious Repatriation). Civil and political rights were recognized only on February 17, 1848.

As a mountain municipality, Rorà was touched by the phenomenon of emigration, in the second half of the nineteenth century (especially towards France and South America, founding the Argentinean town of Alejandra, with whom the Municipality is twinned), and depopulation; unlike other municipalities, however, it was able to combine a poor agricultural economy with a more profitable and industrial activity, until the nineteenth century with the production of lime, and later with the processing of the Luserna stone.

During the period of the Resistance, other painful events affected the town, as in general Val Pellice. The fact that at that time Rorà hosted a group of families from the Jewish community of Turin was quite particular. In this way they found accommodation for rent with families in the De Benedetti, Levi, Amar, Bachi and Terracini families. These 21 people, a number that is not very significant but significant considering that the population was slightly over 200 people, officially lived as displaced people, naturally with false documents, without being reported.

== Economy ==
In the economy of Rorà have always coexisted agriculture, livestock and mining. The oldest mining business is the one of iron, which remains in the toponym of the hamlet Fucine. Later the limestone was exploited for the production of a lime, made inside the furnaces (evidenced by the locality Fornaci, recently restored).

Since 1800 it has been established the processing of lamellar gneiss, or Luserna stone, which for decades has become an essential element of the local economy.

Among the resources of the country, in addition to stone and wood, it is very important the water of some springs, which is channeled and bottled, then also sold outside of Italy.

Finally, tourism has been an important industry since the beginning of the twentieth century, which has made Rorà a holiday resort: initially in villas and structures such as the Alpine Colony, a destination for groups of children and young people from Turin, then with the spread of second homes, campsites and farm stays.

== Geography ==
The municipality is located in Val Pellice, on the right bank of the Pellice stream.

== Nature ==
The Rorà valley largely preserves its natural aspect and therefore offers the opportunity for interesting walks in the middle of beech and chestnut woods (particularly interesting that of the Montano Park). The ascent on the heights (Rocca Bera, on the border with Torre Pellice, easy walk for everyone, and Uvert-Valanza, accessible via a wide dirt road) offer sweeping views over the plain.

There are several naturalistic and historical routes, also for mountain bikes, which are part of the Pinerolese cycle touristic circuit.

Given the forest nature of the territory, however, it is good to make sure of their practicability before embarking on them.

The flora of the area includes the Lou Fraisi of Rouzéi, classified as a monumental tree of interest.

== Culture ==
In 1973 in Rorà was founded the Società di Studi Rorenghi, an association that promotes the cultural life of the town through exhibitions, conferences, walks and projections. Several shows were represented at the Museum of Rorà, that collects testimonies of the life of the village (the processing of stone and lime, the Waldesian history and everyday life). Other activities often take place in the Waldesian hall and in the library. In 1980 was born a craft workshop, that since 2004 started a project related the preservation of the use of local wool. The Municipality of Rorà is also member of the Musicainsieme association which belongs to the Music School of the Val Pellice; therefore contributes to the financing of the school and hosts on its territory the appointments that are part of the musical events organized by the school itself. In 2017 in town was born another cultural project: Stone Oven House art residency curated by artists Sergey Balovin and Claudia Beccato, attracted to Rorà many international artists that created and represented their artworks finding inspiration from nature and local life.

=== Ecomuseum of Stone “Le Loze di Rorà” ===
The Ecomuseum of Stone in Rorà consists of two sites, both greatly representative of community life. The first site can be located in the heart of the village: one of the most ancient buildings hosts the Waldensian museum, which, through artifacts and tools, testifies the rich and eventful life of the inhabitants of Rorà, peasants and quarrymen. The other site is in the open: it's the historical quarry of Tupinet, which is no longer operative and effectively represents the condition of the original 19th century quarries. The track, along which life-sized mannequins have been placed, unfolds through the mountains, depicting the various phases of the work inside the quarry. The visitor explores and rediscovers in a “material” fashion techniques and tools - both ancient and modern, working and operational needs, working conditions and atavistic daily gestures.
