= Henri Arnaud (pastor) =

- Henri Arnaud
- Born: 15 July 1643; Embrun, Hautes-Alpes, France
- Died: 8 September 1721 (aged 78); Schönenberg
- Church: Waldensian
- Writings: "Histoire de la glorieuse rentrée des Vaudois dans leurs vallées" (History of the glorious return of the Vaudois to their valleys)
- Offices held: Pastor, General

Henri Arnaud (July 15, 1643 (and not 1641), Embrun, Hautes-Alpes – September 8, 1721) was a pastor of the Waldensians in Piedmont, who turned soldier in order to protect his co-religionists from persecution at the hands of Victor Amadeus II the Duke of Savoy. When the Waldensians were exiled a second time, Arnaud accompanied them in their exile to Schönenberg, and continued to act as their pastor until his death.

== Life ==
Arnaud was born in Embrun, Hautes-Alpes, France. About 1650 his family returned to their native valley of Luserna, where Arnaud was educated at La Tour (the chief village), later visiting the college at Basel (1662 and 1668) and the academy at Geneva (1666). He then returned home, and seems to have been pastor in several of the Waldensian valleys before attaining that position at La Tour (1685).

== Christian leader ==
He was thus the natural leader of his co-religionists after Victor Amadeus II of Savoy expelled them (1686) from their valleys, and most probably visited Holland; William of Orange, the ruler of that province, certainly gave him help and money. Arnaud occupied himself with organizing his 3,000 countrymen who had taken refuge in Switzerland, and who twice (1687–1688) attempted to regain their homes. The English revolution of 1688, and the election of William to the throne, encouraged the Waldensians to make yet another attempt. Furnished with detailed instructions from the veteran Joshua Janavel (prevented by age from taking part in the expedition) Arnaud, with about 1,000 followers, started on 17 August 1689 from near Nyon on Lake Geneva for their return. On the 27 August, the band, after many hardships and dangers, reached the Valley of St Martin, having passed by Sallanches and crossed many cols and passes reaching up to 9085 ft. They soon took refuge in the lofty and secure rocky citadel of the Balsille, where they were besieged from 24 October 1689 to 14 May 1690 by the troops (about 4,000 in number) of the King of France and the Duke of Savoy.

They maintained this natural fortress against many fierce attacks and during the whole of a winter. In particular, on 2 May, one assault was defeated without the loss of a single man of Arnaud's small band. But another attack (14 May) was not so successful, so that Arnaud withdrew his force, under cover of a thick mist, and led them over the hills to the Val di Angrogna, above La Tour. A month later the Waldensians were received into favour by the duke of Savoy, who had then abandoned his alliance with France for one with Great Britain and Holland. Hence for the next six years the Waldensians helped Savoy against France, though suffering much from the repeated attacks of the French troops. By a clause in the Treaty of Turin (1696), made public in 1698, Victor Amadeus again became hostile to the Waldensians, about 3,000 of whom, with Arnaud, found a shelter in Protestant countries, mainly in Württemberg, where Arnaud became the pastor of Dürrmenz-Schönenberg, northwest of Stuttgart, in 1699. Once again (1704–1706) the Waldensians aided the duke against France. Arnaud, however, took no part in the military operations, though he visited England (1707) to obtain financial aid from Queen Anne.

== Theology ==
Henri Arnaud is among the later Waldensians who had joined the Protestant Reformation in Geneva.

== Death and legacy ==
He died at Schönenberg, which was the church hamlet of the parish of Durrmenz, in 1721. It was during his retirement that he compiled from various documents by other hands his Histoire de la glorieuse rentrée des Vaudois dans leurs vallées, which was published (probably at Kassel) in 1710, with a dedication to Queen Anne. It was translated into English (1827) by H. Dyke Acland, and has also appeared in German and Dutch versions. A part of the original MS. is preserved in the Royal Library in Berlin.
