= European wars of religion =

Series of wars (c. 1522–1697)

The Battle of White Mountain (1620) in Bohemia was one of the decisive battles of the Thirty Years' War that ultimately led to the reconversion of Bohemia to Catholicism.

The European wars of religion were waged in Europe during the 16th, 17th and early 18th centuries. Fought after the Protestant Reformation began in 1517, the wars disrupted the religious and political order in the Catholic countries of Europe. Other motives during the wars involved revolt, territorial ambitions and great power conflicts. By the end of the Thirty Years' War (1618–1648), Catholic France had allied with the Protestant forces against the Catholic Habsburg monarchy. The wars were largely ended by the Peace of Westphalia (1648), which established a new political order that is now known as Westphalian sovereignty.

The conflicts began with the minor Knights' War (1522–1523), followed by the larger German Peasants' War (1524–1525) in the Holy Roman Empire. Warfare intensified after the Catholic Church began the Counter-Reformation against the growth of Protestantism in 1545. The conflicts culminated in the Thirty Years' War, which devastated Germany and killed one third of its population. The Peace of Westphalia broadly resolved the conflicts by recognising three separate Christian traditions in the Holy Roman Empire: Roman Catholicism, Lutheranism, and Calvinism. Smaller religious wars continued to be waged in Western Europe until the 1710s, including the Wars of the Three Kingdoms (1639–1651) in the British Isles, the Savoyard–Waldensian wars (1655–1690), and the Toggenburg War (1712) in the Western Alps.

== Definitions and discussions ==
The European wars of religion are also known as the Wars of the Reformation. In 1517, Martin Luther's Ninety-five Theses took only two months to spread throughout Europe with the help of the printing press, overwhelming the abilities of Holy Roman Emperor Charles V and the papacy to contain it. In 1521, Luther was excommunicated, sealing the schism within Western Christendom between the Roman Catholic Church and the Lutherans and opening the door for other Protestants to resist the power of the papacy.

Although most of the wars ended with the Peace of Westphalia in 1648, religious conflicts continued to be fought in Europe until at least the 1710s. These included the Savoyard–Waldensian wars (1655–1690), the Nine Years' War (1688–1697, including the Glorious Revolution and the Williamite War in Ireland), and the War of the Spanish Succession (1701–1714). Whether these should be included in the European wars of religion depends on how one defines a "war of religion", and whether these wars can be considered "European" (i.e. international rather than domestic).

The religious nature of the wars has also been debated, and contrasted with other factors at play, such as national, dynastic (e.g. they could often simultaneously be characterised as wars of succession), and financial interests. Scholars have pointed out that some European wars of this period were not caused by disputes occasioned by the Reformation, such as the Italian Wars (1494–1559, only involving Catholics), (Note: Although the Italian Wars broke out in 1494, before the Reformation began in 1517, one of the peace conditions of the Treaty of Cateau-Cambrésis (1559) to all parties involved was that they needed to 'purge their lands of heresy'; in other words, all their subjects had to be forcefully reverted to Catholicism. When pressured by Spain to implement this obligation, Emmanuel Philibert, Duke of Savoy proclaimed the Edict of Nice (15 February 1560), which soon led to an armed revolt by the Protestant Waldensians in his domain that would last until July 1561.) as well as the Northern Seven Years' War (1563–1570, only involving Lutherans). Others emphasise the fact that cross-religious alliances existed, such as the Lutheran duke Maurice of Saxony assisting the Catholic emperor Charles V in the first Schmalkaldic War in 1547 in order to become the Saxon elector instead of John Frederick, his Lutheran cousin, while the Catholic king Henry II of France supported the Lutheran cause in the Second Schmalkaldic War in 1552 to secure French bases in modern-day Lorraine. The Encyclopædia Britannica maintains that "[the] wars of religion of this period [were] fought mainly for confessional security and political gain."

In the late 20th century, revisionist historians including William M. Lamont argued religion was a primary driver behind the 1639 to 1653 Wars of the Three Kingdoms, while John Morrill (1993) claimed it "was not the first European revolution...[but] the last of the Wars of Religion." This view was subsequently criticised by historians like Glen Burgess, whose views were based on a study of Parliamentarian political propaganda. He concluded that while many Puritans took up arms in protest against the religious reforms promoted by Charles I of England, they often justified their opposition as a revolt against a monarch who had violated crucial constitutional principles, and thus had to be overthrown. They even warned other Parliamentarians to avoid overt use of religious arguments in making their case for war against the king.

It can be argued that religious motives were often concealed by legalistic arguments, for example emphasising the need to defend the Church of England as the national church: "Seen in this light, the defenses of Parliament's war, with their apparent legal-constitutional thrust, are not at all ways of saying that the struggle was not religious. On the contrary, they are ways of saying that it was."

== Overview of the wars ==
- British Isles
- Low Countries
- Spain & Portugal
- Central Europe (HRE)
- France & Italy
- Scandinavia, Baltics & Eastern Europe

Individual conflicts that may be distinguished within this topic include:

- Pre-Reformation wars:
  - The Oldcastle Revolt (1414) in England (sometimes considered to have "foreshadowed the wars of religion")
  - The Hussite Wars (1419–1434) in the Lands of the Bohemian Crown
- Conflicts immediately connected with the Reformation:
  - The Knights' War (1522–1523) in the Holy Roman Empire
  - The First Dalecarlian Rebellion (1524–1525) in Sweden.
  - The German Peasants' War (1524–1526) in the Holy Roman Empire
  - The Second Dalecarlian Rebellion (1527–1528) in Sweden.
  - The Wars of Kappel (1529–1531) in the Old Swiss Confederacy
  - The Tudor conquest of Ireland (1529–1603) on the Catholic population of Ireland by the Tudor kings of England and their Protestant allies
    - The Kildare Rebellion (1534–1535)
    - The First Desmond Rebellion (1569–1573)
    - The Second Desmond Rebellion (1579–1583)
    - The Nine Years' War (1593–1603)
  - The Third Dalecarlian Rebellion (1531–1533) in Sweden.
  - The War of Two Kings (1531–1532) in the Kalmar Union (Denmark and Norway)
  - The Count's Feud (1534–1536) in the Kalmar Union (Denmark and Norway)
  - The Münster rebellion (1534–1535) in the Prince-Bishopric of Münster
  - The Anabaptist riot (1535) in Amsterdam
  - Olav Engelbrektsson's rebellion (1536–1537) in Norway
  - Bigod's rebellion (1537) in England
  - The Dacke War (1542–1543) in Sweden
- Conflicts after the death of Martin Luther:
  - The Schmalkaldic War (1546–1547) in the Holy Roman Empire
  - The Prayer Book Rebellion (1549) in England
  - The Battle of Sauðafell (1550) on Iceland
  - The Second Schmalkaldic War or Princes' Revolt (1552–1555)
  - Wyatt's rebellion (1554) in England over Mary I of England's decision to marry the Catholic non-English prince Philip II of Spain. Mary's repression of the rebellion earned her the nickname "Bloody Mary" amongst Protestants.
  - The French Wars of Religion (1562–1598) in France
  - The Eighty Years' War (1566/68–1648) in the Low Countries
  - The Cologne War (1583–1588) in the Electorate of Cologne
  - The Strasbourg Bishops' War (1592–1604) in the Prince-Bishopric of Strasbourg
  - The War against Sigismund (1598–1599) in the Polish–Swedish union
  - The Bocskai uprising (1604–1606) in Hungary and Transylvania
  - The War of the Jülich Succession (1609–10, 1614) in the United Duchies of Jülich-Cleves-Berg
- The Thirty Years' War (1618–1648), affecting the Holy Roman Empire including the Habsburg monarchy and Bohemia and Moravia, France, Denmark-Norway and Sweden
  - Bohemian Revolt (1618–1620) between the Protestant nobility of the Bohemian Crown and their Catholic Habsburg king. This revolt started the Thirty Years' War, causing additional conflicts elsewhere in Europe, and subsuming other already ongoing conflicts.
  - Hessian War (1567–1648) between the Lutheran Landgraviate of Hesse-Darmstadt (member of the Catholic League) and the Calvinist Landgraviate of Hesse-Kassel (member of the Protestant Union)
- The Huguenot rebellions (1621–1629) in France
- The Wars of the Three Kingdoms (1639–1653), affecting England, Scotland and Ireland
  - Bishops' Wars (1639–1640)
  - English Civil War (1642–1651)
  - Scotland in the Wars of the Three Kingdoms (1639–1652)
  - Irish Confederate Wars (1641–1653) and the Cromwellian conquest of Ireland (1649–1653)
- The post-Westphalian wars:
  - The Düsseldorf Cow War (1651)
  - The Savoyard–Waldensian wars (1655–1690) beginning with the Piedmontese Easter (Pasque piemontesi) of April 1655, in the Duchy of Savoy
  - The First War of Villmergen (1656) in the Old Swiss Confederacy
  - The Second Anglo-Dutch War (1665–1667) between England and the Dutch Republic
  - The Kuruc rebellion (1672) in Hungary
  - Emeric Thököly's rebellion (1677–1685) in Hungary
  - The Nine Years' War (1688–1697)
    - The Glorious Revolution (1688–1689)
    - The Williamite War in Ireland (1688–1691)
    - The Jacobite rising of 1689 in Scotland saw Roman Catholics and Anglican Tories supporting the deposed Catholic king James Stuart take up arms against the newly enthroned Calvinist William of Orange and his Presbyterian Covenanter allies; the religious component may be regarded as secondary to the dynastic factor, however.
  - The War of the Spanish Succession (1701–1714) across Europe had a strong religious component
  - The War in the Cevennes (1702–1710) in France
  - Rákóczi's War of Independence (1703–1711) in Hungary
  - The Toggenburg War (Second War of Villmergen) (1712) in the Old Swiss Confederacy

== Holy Roman Empire ==
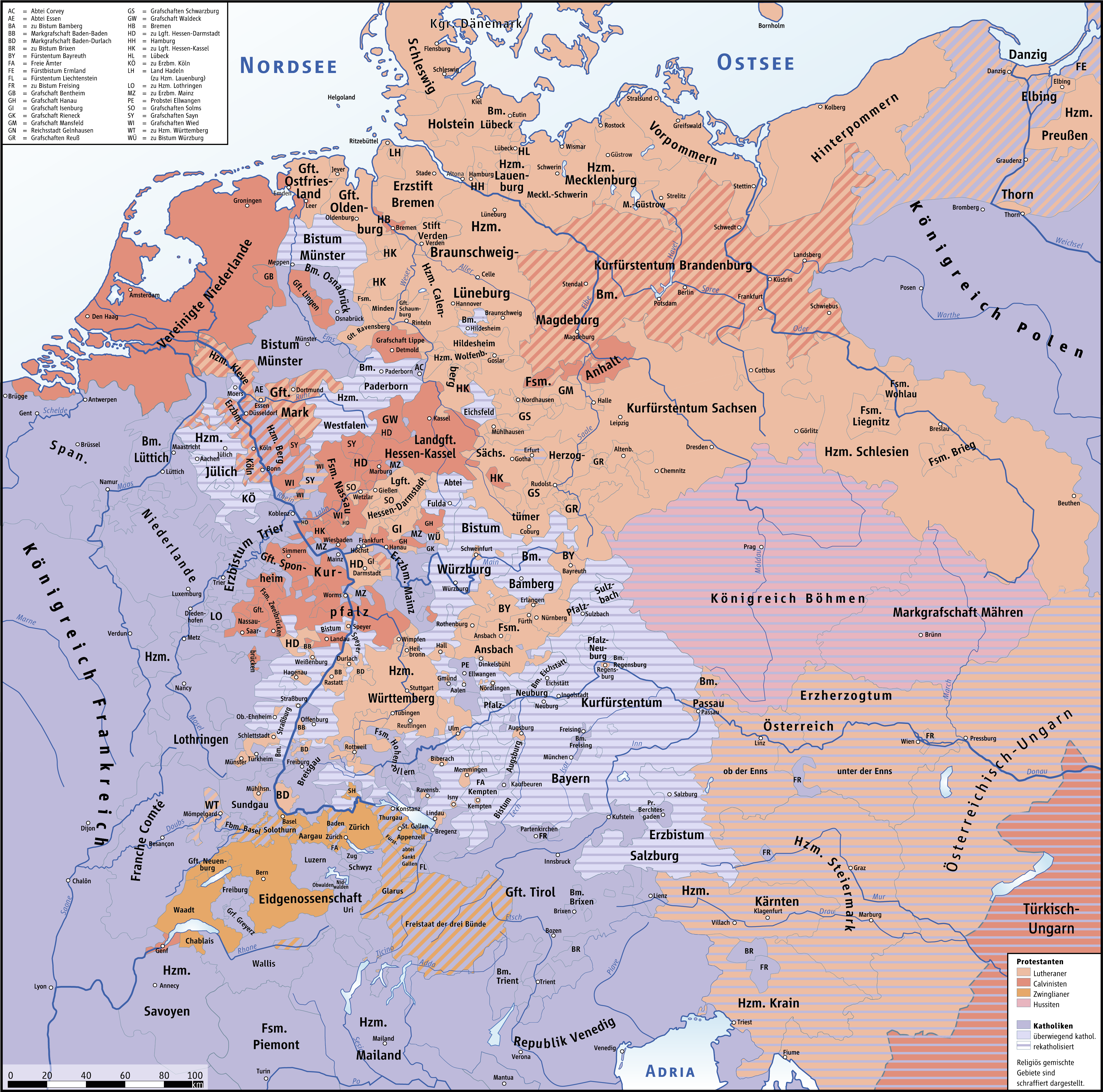
Religious situation in the Holy Roman Empire at the outbreak of the Thirty Years' War in 1618

The Holy Roman Empire, encompassing present-day Germany and surrounding territory, was the area most devastated by the wars of religion. The Empire was a fragmented collection of practically independent states with an elected Holy Roman Emperor as their titular ruler; after the 14th century, this position was usually held by a Habsburg. The Austrian House of Habsburg, who remained Catholic, was a major European power in its own right, ruling over some eight million subjects in present-day Germany, Austria, Bohemia and Hungary. The Empire also contained regional powers, such as Bavaria, the Electorate of Saxony, the Margraviate of Brandenburg, the Electorate of the Palatinate, the Landgraviate of Hesse, the Archbishopric of Trier, and Württemberg. A vast number of minor independent duchies, free imperial cities, abbeys, bishoprics, and small lordships of sovereign families rounded out the Empire.

Lutheranism, from its inception at Wittenberg in 1517, found a ready reception in Germany, as well as German-speaking parts of Hussite Bohemia (where the Hussite Wars took place from 1419 to 1434, and Hussites remained a majority of the population until the 1620 Battle of White Mountain). The preaching of Martin Luther and his many followers raised tensions across Europe. In Northern Germany, Luther adopted the tactic of gaining the support of the local princes and city elites in his struggle to take over and re-establish the church along Lutheran lines. The Elector of Saxony, the Landgrave of Hesse, and other North German princes not only protected Luther from retaliation from the edict of outlawry issued by the Holy Roman Emperor, Charles V, but also used state power to enforce the establishment of Lutheran worship in their lands, in what is called the Magisterial Reformation. Church property was seized, and Catholic worship was forbidden in most territories that adopted the Lutheran Reformation. The political conflicts thus engendered within the Empire led almost inevitably to war.

The Knights' War of 1522 was a revolt by a number of Protestant and religious humanist German knights led by Franz von Sickingen, against the Roman Catholic Church and the Holy Roman Emperor. It has also been called the "Poor Barons' Rebellion". The revolt was short-lived but would inspire the bloody German Peasants' War of 1524–1526.

=== Rebellions of Anabaptists and other radicals ===
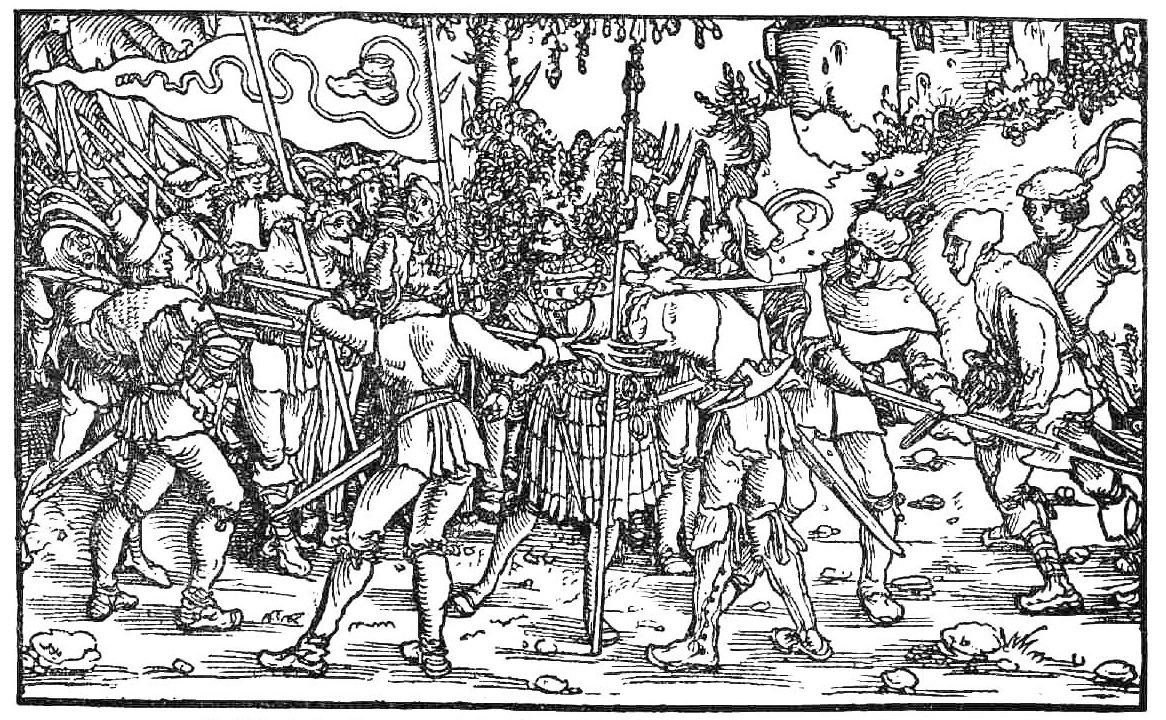
Rebellious peasants surrounding a knight

The first large-scale wave of violence was engendered by the more radical wing of the Reformation movement, whose adherents wished to extend the wholesale reform of the Church into a similarly wholesale reform of society in general. This was a step that the princes supporting Luther were not willing to countenance. The German Peasants' War of 1524/25 was a popular revolt inspired by the teachings of the radical reformers. It consisted of a series of economic as well as religious revolts by Anabaptist peasants, townsfolk and nobles. The conflict took place mostly in southern, western and central areas of modern Germany but also affected areas in neighboring modern Switzerland, Austria and the Netherlands (for example, the 1535 Anabaptist riot in Amsterdam). At its height, in the spring and summer of 1525, it involved an estimated 300,000 peasant insurgents. Contemporary estimates put the dead at 100,000. It was Europe's largest and most widespread popular uprising before the 1789 French Revolution.

Because of their revolutionary political ideas, radical reformers like Thomas Müntzer were compelled to leave the Lutheran cities of North Germany in the early 1520s. They spread their revolutionary religious and political doctrines into the countryside of Bohemia, Southern Germany, and Switzerland. Starting as a revolt against feudal oppression, the peasants' uprising became a war against all constituted authorities, and an attempt to establish by force an ideal Christian commonwealth. The total defeat of the insurgents at Frankenhausen on 15 May 1525, was followed by the execution of Müntzer and thousands of his peasant followers. Martin Luther rejected the demands of the insurgents and upheld the right of Germany's rulers to suppress the uprisings, setting out his views in his polemic Against the Murderous, Thieving Hordes of Peasants. This played a major part in the rejection of his teachings by many German peasants, particularly in the south.

After the Peasants' War, a second and more determined attempt to establish a theocracy was made at Münster, in Westphalia (1532–1535). Here a group of prominent citizens, including the Lutheran pastor turned Anabaptist Bernhard Rothmann, Jan Matthys, and Jan Bockelson ("John of Leiden") had little difficulty in obtaining possession of the town on 5 January 1534. Matthys identified Münster as the "New Jerusalem", and preparations were made to not only hold what had been gained, but to proceed from Münster toward the conquest of the world.

Claiming to be the successor of David, John of Leiden was installed as king. He legalized polygamy and took sixteen wives, one of whom he beheaded in the marketplace. Community of goods was also established. After obstinate resistance, the town was taken by the besiegers on 24 June 1535, and then Leiden and some of his more prominent followers were executed in the marketplace.

=== Swiss Confederacy ===
In 1529 under the lead of Huldrych Zwingli, the Protestant canton and city of Zürich had concluded with other Protestant cantons a defence alliance, the Christliches Burgrecht, which also included the cities of Konstanz and Strasbourg. The Catholic cantons in response had formed an alliance with Ferdinand of Austria.

At the Second Battle of Kappel, Zwingli's supporters were defeated and Zwingli himself was killed.

After numerous minor incidents and provocations from both sides, a Catholic priest was executed in the Thurgau in May 1528, and the Protestant pastor J. Keyser was burned at the stake in Schwyz in 1529. The last straw was the installation of a Catholic vogt at Baden, and Zürich declared war on 8 June (First War of Kappel), occupied the Thurgau and the territories of the Abbey of St. Gall, and marched to Kappel at the border to Zug. Open war was avoided by means of a peace agreement (Erster Landfriede) that was not exactly favourable to the Catholic side, which had to dissolve its alliance with the Austrian Habsburgs. Tensions remained essentially unresolved.

On 11 October 1531, the Catholic cantons decisively defeated the forces of Zürich in the Second War of Kappel. The Zürich troops had little support from allied Protestant cantons, and Huldrych Zwingli was killed on the battlefield, along with twenty-four other pastors. After the defeat, the forces of Zürich regrouped and attempted to occupy the Zugerberg, and some of them camped on the Gubel hill near Menzingen. A small force of Aegeri succeeded in routing the camp, and the demoralized Zürich force had to retreat, forcing the Protestants to agree to a peace treaty to their disadvantage. Switzerland was to be divided into a patchwork of Protestant and Catholic cantons, with the Protestants tending to dominate the larger cities, and the Catholics the more rural areas.

In 1656, tensions between Protestants and Catholics re-emerged and led to the outbreak of the First War of Villmergen. The Catholics were victorious and able to maintain their political dominance. The Toggenburg War in 1712 was a conflict between Catholic and Protestant cantons. According to the Peace of Aarau of 11 August 1712 and the Peace of Baden of 7 September 1714, the war ended with the end of Catholic hegemony. The Sonderbund War of 1847 was also based on religion: the liberal-Protestant anti-clerical cantons led by Zürich and Bern sought to reduce the influence of Catholic monasteries, against which the conservative ultramontanist Catholic cantons of Central Switzerland formed the Sonderbund.

=== Schmalkaldic Wars and other early conflicts ===
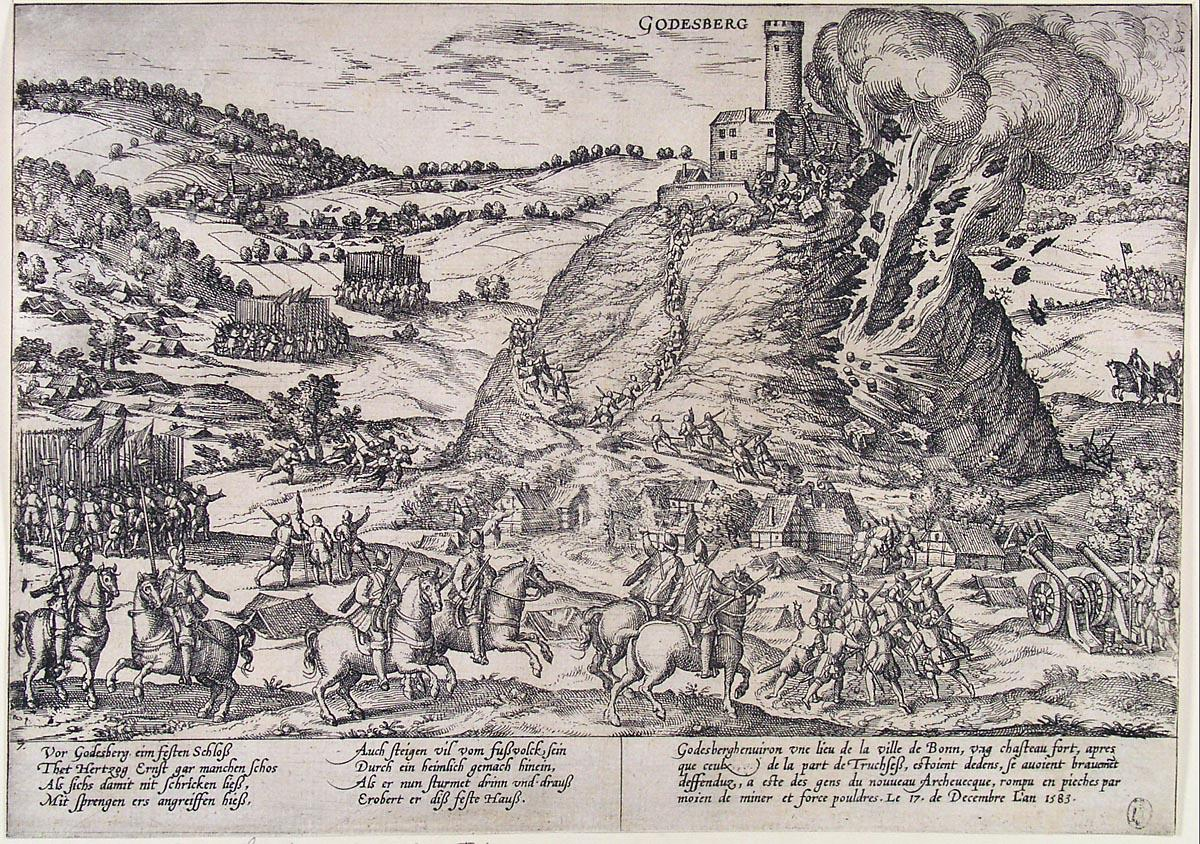
Destruction of the fortress above the village of Godesberg during the Cologne War, 1583; the walls were breached by mines, and most of the defenders were put to death. Engraved by Frans Hogenberg, a Dutch engraver and artist of the 16th century.

Following the Diet of Augsburg in 1530, the Emperor demanded that all religious innovations not authorized by the Diet be abandoned by 15 April 1531. Failure to comply would result in prosecution by the Imperial Court. In response, the Lutheran princes who had set up Protestant churches in their own realms met in the town of Schmalkalden in December 1530. Here they banded together to form the Schmalkaldic League (German: Schmalkaldischer Bund), an alliance designed to protect themselves from the Imperial action. Its members eventually intended the League to replace the Holy Roman Empire itself, and each state was to provide 10,000 infantry and 2,000 cavalry for mutual defense. In 1532 the Emperor, pressed by external troubles, stepped back from confrontation, offering the "Peace of Nuremberg", which suspended all action against the Protestant states pending a General Council of the Church. The moratorium kept peace in the German lands for over a decade, yet Protestantism became further entrenched, and spread, during its term.

The peace finally ended in the Schmalkaldic War (German: Schmalkaldischer Krieg), a brief conflict between 1546 and 1547 between the forces of Charles V and the princes of the Schmalkaldic League. The conflict ended with the advantage of the Catholics, and the Emperor was able to impose the Augsburg Interim, a compromise allowing slightly modified worship, and supposed to remain in force until the conclusion of a General Council of the Church. However various Protestant elements rejected the Interim, and the Second Schmalkaldic War broke out in 1552, which would last until 1555.

The Peace of Augsburg (1555), signed by Charles V, Holy Roman Emperor, confirmed the result of the 1526 Diet of Speyer and ended the violence between the Lutherans and the Catholics in Germany. It stated that:

- German princes could choose the religion (Lutheranism or Catholicism) of their realms according to their conscience. The citizens of each state were forced to adopt the religion of their rulers (the principle of cuius regio, eius religio).
- Lutherans living in an ecclesiastical state (under the control of a bishop) could continue to practice their faith.
- Lutherans could keep the territory that they had captured from the Catholic Church since the Peace of Passau in 1552.
- The ecclesiastical leaders of the Catholic Church (bishops) that had converted to Lutheranism were required to give up their territories.

Religious tensions remained strong throughout the second half of the 16th century. The Peace of Augsburg began to unravel as some bishops converting to Protestantism refused to give up their bishoprics. This was evident from the Cologne War (1582–83), a conflict initiated when the prince-archbishop of the city converted to Calvinism. Religious tensions also broke into violence in the German free city of Donauwörth in 1606, when the Lutheran majority barred the Catholic residents from holding a procession, provoking a riot. This prompted intervention by Duke Maximilian of Bavaria on behalf of the Catholics.

By the end of the 16th century the Rhine lands and those of southern Germany remained largely Catholic, while Lutherans predominated in the north, and Calvinists dominated in west-central Germany, Switzerland, and the Netherlands. The latter formed the League of Evangelical Union in 1608.

=== Thirty Years' War ===
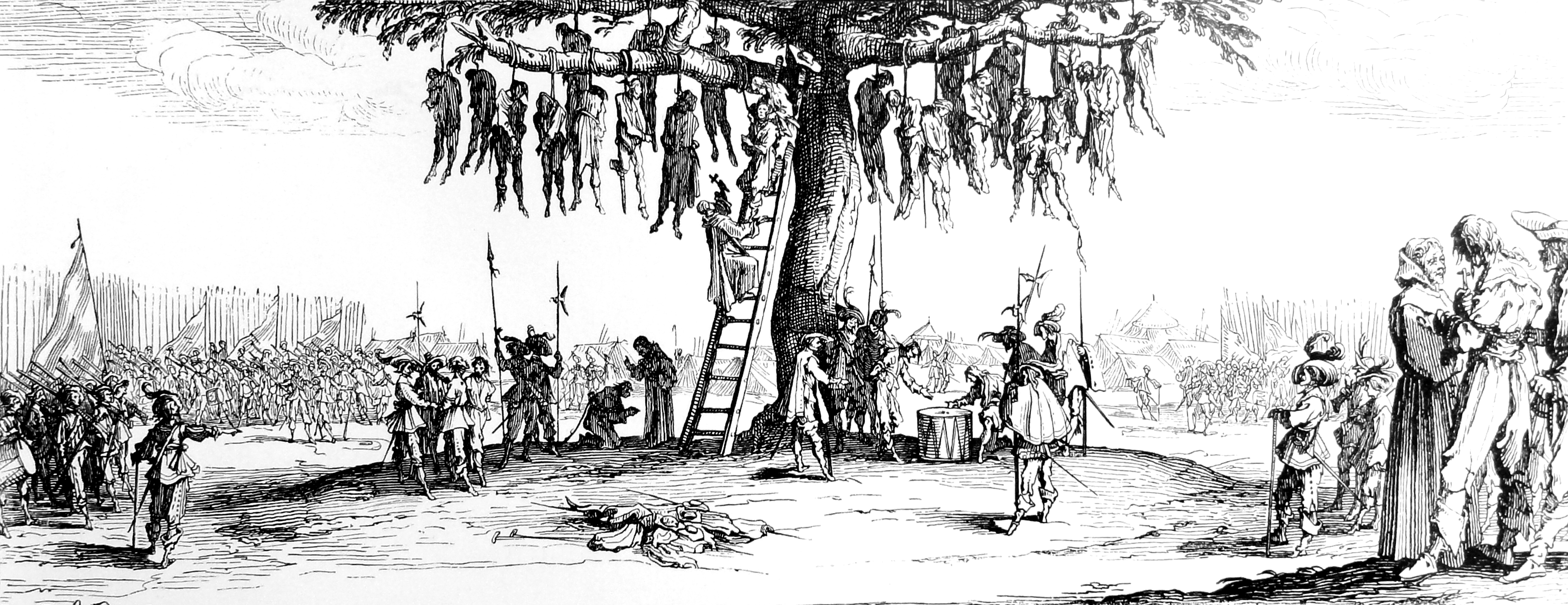
The Great Miseries of War by Jacques Callot, 1632

By 1617, Germany was bitterly divided, and it was clear that Matthias, Holy Roman Emperor and King of Bohemia, would die without an heir. His lands would therefore fall to his nearest male relative, his cousin Ferdinand of Styria. Ferdinand, having been educated by the Jesuits, was a staunch Catholic. The rejection of Ferdinand as Crown Prince by the mostly Hussite Bohemia triggered the Thirty Years' War in 1618, when his representatives were defenestrated in Prague.

The Thirty Years' War was fought between 1618 and 1648, principally on the territory of today's Germany, and involved most of the major European powers. Beginning as a religious conflict between Protestants and Catholics in the Holy Roman Empire, it gradually developed into a general war involving much of Europe, for reasons not necessarily related to religion. The war marked a continuation of the France-Habsburg rivalry for pre-eminence in Europe, which led later to direct war between France and Spain. Military intervention by external powers such as Denmark and Sweden on the Protestant side increased the duration of the war and the extent of its devastation. In the latter stages of the war, Catholic France, fearful of an increase in Habsburg power, also intervened on the Protestant side.

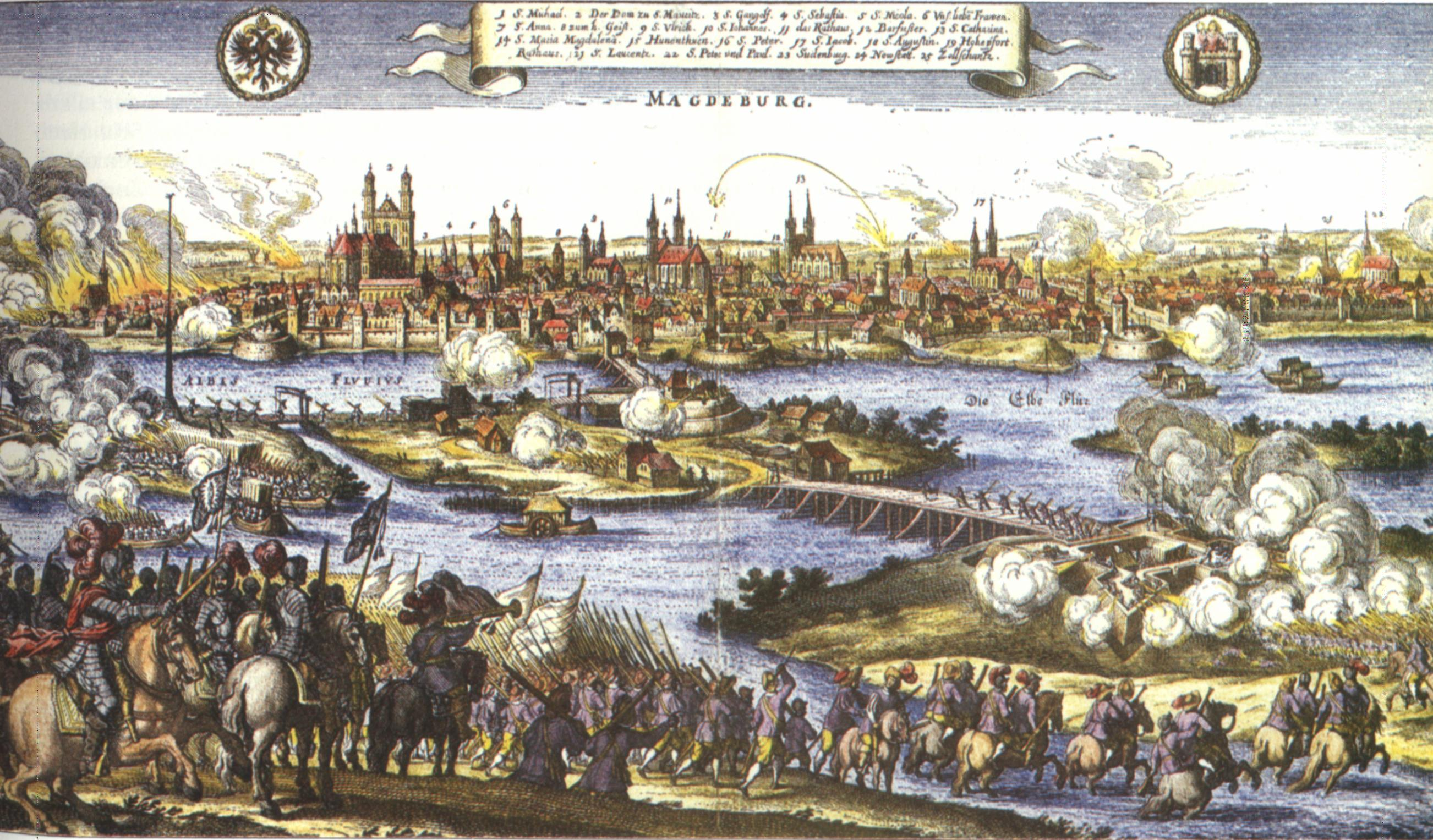
The sack of Magdeburg in 1631. The Imperialist troops, particularly the Croat and Walloon regiments, went on a rampage of murder and mayhem that left only 10,000 survivors out of the city's 30,000 citizens and defenders. It was the war's worst massacre.

The major impact of the Thirty Years' War, in which mercenary armies were extensively used, was the devastation of entire regions scavenged bare by the foraging armies. Episodes of widespread famine and disease devastated the population of the German states and, to a lesser extent, the Low Countries and Italy, while bankrupting many of the powers involved. The war ended with the Treaty of Münster, a part of the wider Peace of Westphalia.

During the war, Germany's population was reduced by 30% on average. In the territory of Brandenburg, the losses had amounted to half, while in some areas an estimated two thirds of the population died. The population of the Czech lands declined by a third. The Swedish army alone, which was no greater a ravager than the other armies of the Thirty Years' War, destroyed 2,000 castles, 18,000 villages and 1,500 towns during its tenure of 17 years in Germany. For decades armies and armed bands had roamed Germany like packs of wolves, slaughtering the populace like sheep. One band of marauders even styled themselves as "Werewolves". Huge damage was done to monasteries, churches and other religious institutions. The war had proved disastrous for the German-speaking parts of the Holy Roman Empire. Germany lost population and territory, and was henceforth further divided into hundreds of largely impotent semi-independent states. The Imperial power retreated to Austria and the Habsburg lands. The Netherlands and Switzerland were confirmed independent. The peace institutionalised the Catholic, Lutheran, Calvinist religious divide in Germany, with populations either converting, or moving to areas controlled by rulers of their own faith.

One authority puts France's losses against Austria at 80,000 killed or wounded and against Spain (including the years 1648–1659, after Westphalia) at 300,000 dead or disabled. Sweden and Finland lost, by one calculation, 110,000 dead from all causes. Another 400,000 Germans, British, and other nationalities died in Swedish service.

== Low Countries ==
The Eighty Years' War (Note: Dutch: Tachtigjarige Oorlog; Spanish: Guerra de los Ochenta Años or Guerra de Flandes, lit. 'War of Flanders'; Picard: Wère ed Quateur-vingts Ans) or Dutch Revolt (Note: Dutch: Nederlandse Opstand; Spanish: La Revuelta neerlandesa; Picard: Rèvolte hollandaise) (c. 1566/1568–1648) (Note: There is disagreement about name and periodisation of the war, see Historiography of the Eighty Years' War § Name and periodisation.) was an armed conflict in the Habsburg Netherlands (Note: The Habsburg Netherlands were at the time also known as the Seventeen Provinces, today roughly covering the Netherlands, Belgium, Luxembourg and parts of northern France, but excluding areas such as the Principality of Liège.) between disparate groups of rebels and the Spanish government. The causes of the war included the Reformation, centralisation, excessive taxation, and the rights and privileges of the Dutch nobility and cities.

After the initial stages, Philip II of Spain, the sovereign of the Netherlands, deployed his armies and regained control over most of the rebel-held territories. However, widespread mutinies in the Spanish army caused a general uprising. Under the leadership of the exiled William the Silent, the Catholic and Protestant-dominated provinces sought to establish religious peace while jointly opposing the king's regime with the Pacification of Ghent, but the general rebellion failed to sustain itself.

Despite steady military and diplomatic successes by the Governor of Spanish Netherlands and General for Spain, the Duke of Parma, the Union of Utrecht continued their resistance, proclaiming their independence through the 1581 Act of Abjuration and establishing the Calvinist-dominated Dutch Republic in 1588. In the Ten Years thereafter, the Republic (whose heartland was no longer threatened) made conquests in the north and east and received diplomatic recognition from France and England in 1596. The Dutch colonial empire emerged, which began with Dutch attacks on Portugal's overseas territories.

Facing a stalemate, the two sides agreed to a Twelve Years' Truce in 1609; when it expired in 1621, fighting resumed as part of the broader Thirty Years' War. An end was reached in 1648 with the Peace of Münster when Spain retained the Southern Netherlands and recognised the Dutch Republic as an independent country.

== France ==
In 1532, King Francis I intervened politically and militarily in support of Protestant German princes against the Habsburgs, as did King Henry II in 1551; both kings firmly repressed attempts to spread Lutheran ideas within France. An organised influx of Calvinist preachers from Geneva and elsewhere during the 1550s succeeded in setting up hundreds of underground Calvinist congregations in France.

=== 1560s ===
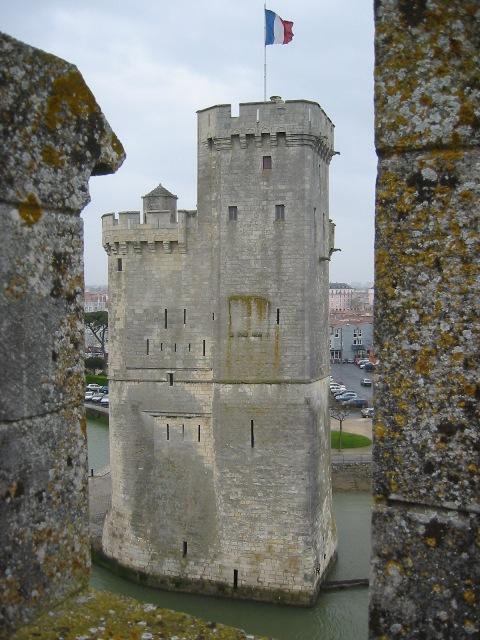
The fortified harbour of La Rochelle in western France became a Protestant stronghold that was fought over in two lengthy sieges.

In a pattern soon to become familiar in the Netherlands and Scotland, underground Calvinist preaching and the formation of covert alliances with members of the nobility quickly led to more direct action to gain political and religious control. The prospect of taking over rich church properties and monastic lands had led nobles in many parts of Europe to support a princely Reformation. Added to this was the Calvinist teaching that leading citizens had the duty to overthrow what they perceived as an ungodly ruler (i.e. one who was not supportive of Calvinism). In March 1560, the "Amboise conspiracy", or "Tumult of Amboise", was an attempt on the part of a group of disaffected nobles to abduct the young king Francis II and eliminate the Catholic House of Guise. It was foiled when their plans were discovered. The first major instances of systematic Protestant destruction of images and statues in Catholic churches occurred in Rouen and La Rochelle in 1560. The following year, the attacks extended to over 20 cities and towns, and would, in turn, incite Catholic urban groups to massacres and riots in Sens, Cahors, Carcassonne, Tours and other cities.

In December 1560, Francis II died, and Catherine de' Medici became regent for her young son Charles IX. Although a Roman Catholic, she was prepared to deal favourably with the Huguenot House of Bourbon. She therefore supported religious toleration in the shape of the Edict of Saint-Germain (January 1562), which allowed the Huguenots to worship publicly outside of towns and privately inside of them. On 1 March, a faction of the Guise family's retainers attacked an illegal Calvinist service in Wassy-sur-Blaise in Champagne. As hostilities broke out, the Edict was revoked.

This provoked the First War. The Bourbons, with English support and led by Louis I de Bourbon, Prince de Condé, and Admiral Coligny, began to seize and garrison strategic towns along the Loire. The Battle of Dreux and the battle of Orléans were the first major engagements of the conflict. In February 1563, at Orléans, Francis, Duke of Guise was assassinated, and Catherine's fears that the war might drag on led her to mediate a truce and the Edict of Amboise (1563), which again provided for a controlled religious toleration of Protestant worship.

However, this was generally regarded as unsatisfactory by both Catholics and Protestants. The political temperature of the surrounding lands was rising, as religious unrest grew in the Netherlands. The Huguenots tried to gain French government support for intervention against the Spanish forces arriving in the Netherlands. Failing this, Protestant troops then made an unsuccessful attempt to capture and take control of King Charles IX at Meaux in 1567. This provoked a further outbreak of hostilities (the Second War), which ended in another unsatisfactory truce, the Peace of Longjumeau (March 1568).

In September of that year, war again broke out (the Third War). Catherine and Charles decided this time to ally themselves with the House of Guise. The Huguenot army was under the command of Louis I de Bourbon, prince de Condé, and aided by forces from south-eastern France and a contingent of Protestant militias from Germany—including 14,000 mercenary reiters led by the Calvinist Duke of Zweibrücken. After the Duke was killed in action, he was succeeded by the Count of Mansfeld and the Dutch William of Orange and his brothers Louis and Henry. Much of the Huguenots' financing came from Queen Elizabeth I of England. The Catholics were commanded by the Duke d'Anjou (later King Henry III) and assisted by troops from Spain, the Papal States and the Grand Duchy of Tuscany.

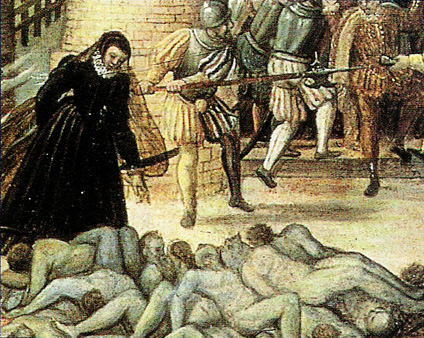
St. Bartholomew's Day massacre in 1572

The Protestant army laid siege to several cities in the Poitou and Saintonge regions (to protect La Rochelle), and then Angoulême and Cognac. At the Battle of Jarnac (16 March 1569), the Prince de Condé was killed, forcing Admiral de Coligny to take command of the Protestant forces. Coligny and his troops retreated to the south-west and regrouped with Gabriel, comte de Montgomery, and in the spring of 1570, they pillaged Toulouse, cut a path through the south of France and went up the Rhone valley to La Charité-sur-Loire. The staggering royal debt and Charles IX's desire to seek a peaceful solution led to the Peace of Saint-Germain-en-Laye (8 August 1570), which once more allowed some concessions to the Huguenots. In 1572, rising tensions between local Catholics and Protestant forces attending the wedding of the Protestant Henry of Navarre, and the King's sister, Marguerite de Valois, culminated in the Saint Bartholomew's Day Massacre. This led to the Fourth and Fifth Civil wars in 1572 and 1573–1576.

=== Henry III ===
Henry of Anjou was crowned King Henry III of France in 1575, at Reims, but hostilities—the Fifth War—had already flared up again. Henry soon found himself in the difficult position of trying to maintain royal authority in the face of feuding warlords who refused to compromise. In 1576, the King signed the Edict of Beaulieu, granting minor concessions to the Calvinists, but a brief Sixth Civil War took place in 1577. Henry I, Duke of Guise, formed the Catholic League to protect the Catholic cause in France. Further hostilities—the Seventh War (1579–1580)—ended in the stalemate of the Treaty of Fleix.

The fragile compromise came to an end in 1584, when the King's youngest brother and heir presumptive, François, Duke of Anjou, died. As Henry III had no son, under Salic Law, the next heir to the throne was the Calvinist Prince Henry of Navarre. Under pressure from the Duke of Guise, Henry III reluctantly issued an edict suppressing Protestantism and annulling Henry of Navarre's right to the throne.

In December 1584, the Duke of Guise signed the Treaty of Joinville on behalf of the Catholic League with Philip II of Spain, who supplied a considerable annual grant to the League. The situation degenerated into the Eighth War (1585–1589). Henry of Navarre again sought foreign aid from the German princes and Elizabeth I of England. Meanwhile, the solidly Catholic people of Paris, under the influence of the Committee of Sixteen, were becoming dissatisfied with Henry III and his failure to defeat the Calvinists. On 12 May 1588, a popular uprising raised barricades on the streets of Paris, and Henry III fled the city. The Committee of Sixteen took complete control of the government and welcomed the Duke of Guise to Paris. The Guises then proposed a settlement with a cypher as heir and demanded a meeting of the Estates-General, which was to be held in Blois.

King Henry decided to strike first. On 23 December 1588 at the Château de Blois, Henry of Guise and his brother, the Cardinal de Guise, were lured into a trap and were murdered. The Duke of Guise had been highly popular in France, and the league declared open war against King Henry. The Parlement of Paris instituted criminal charges against the King, who now joined forces with his cousin, Henry of Navarre, to war against the League.

Charles of Lorraine, Duke of Mayenne, then became the leader of the Catholic League. League presses began printing anti-royalist tracts under a variety of pseudonyms, while the Sorbonne proclaimed that it was just and necessary to depose Henry III. In July 1589, in the royal camp at Saint-Cloud, a monk named Jacques Clément gained an audience with the King and drove a long knife into his spleen. Clément was executed on the spot, taking with him the information of who, if anyone, had hired him. On his deathbed, Henry III called for Henry of Navarre and begged him, in the name of Statecraft, to become a Catholic, citing the brutal warfare that would ensue if he refused. In keeping with Salic Law, he named Henry as his heir.

=== Henry IV ===
The situation on the ground in 1589 was that King Henry IV of France, as Navarre had become, held the south and west, and the Catholic League the north and east. The leadership of the Catholic League had devolved to the Duke de Mayenne, who was appointed Lieutenant-General of the kingdom. He and his troops controlled most of rural Normandy. However, in September 1589, Henry inflicted a severe defeat on the Duke at the Battle of Arques. Henry's army swept through Normandy, taking town after town throughout the winter.

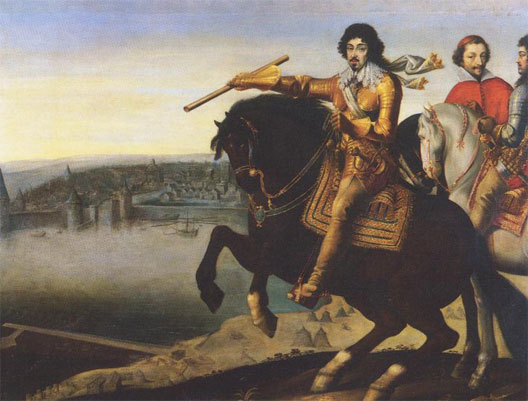
The first part of the reign of Henry IV's son Louis XIII was marked by domestic conflict, including a series of Huguenot rebellions in the 1620s.

The King knew that he had to take Paris if he stood any chance of ruling all of France, and this was no easy task. The Catholic League's presses and supporters continued to spread stories about atrocities committed against Catholic priests and the laity in Protestant England, such as the Forty Martyrs of England and Wales. The city prepared to fight to the death rather than accept a Calvinist king. The Battle of Ivry, fought on 14 March 1590, was another victory for the king, and Henry's forces went on to lay siege to Paris, but the siege was broken by Spanish support. Realising that his predecessor had been right and that there was no prospect of a Protestant king succeeding in Catholic Paris, Henry reputedly uttered the famous phrase Paris vaut bien une messe ("Paris is well worth a Mass"). He was formally received into the Roman Catholic Church in 1593 and was crowned at Chartres in 1594.

Some members of the League fought on, but enough Catholics were won over by the King's conversion to increasingly isolate the diehards. The Spanish withdrew from France under the terms of the Peace of Vervins. Henry was faced with the task of rebuilding a shattered and impoverished Kingdom and reuniting France under a single authority. The wars concluded in 1598, when Henry IV issued the Edict of Nantes, which granted a degree of religious toleration to Protestants.

France, although always ruled by a Catholic monarch, had played a major part in supporting the Protestants in Germany and the Netherlands against their dynastic rivals, the Habsburgs. The period of the French Wars of Religion effectively removed France's influence as a major European power, allowing the Catholic forces in the Holy Roman Empire to regroup and recover.

== Denmark–Norway ==
=== Denmark ===
In 1524, King Christian II converted to Lutheranism and encouraged Lutheran preachers to enter Denmark despite the opposition of the Danish diet of 1524. Following the death of King Frederick I in 1533, war broke out between Catholic followers of Count Christoph of Oldenburg and the firmly Lutheran Count Christian of Holstein. After losing his main support in Lübeck, Christoph quickly fell to defeat, finally losing his last stronghold of Copenhagen in 1536. Lutheranism was immediately established, the Catholic bishops were imprisoned, and monastic and church lands were soon confiscated to pay for the armies that had brought Christian to power. In Denmark, this increased royal revenues by 300%.

=== Norway, Faroe Islands, and Iceland ===
Christian III established Lutheranism by force in Norway in 1537, Faroe Islands in 1540, and Iceland in 1550. In 1536/1537, he also made Norway a puppet state under the Danish crown. It would be a puppet state until 1814, when Frederick VI renounced his claims to the Crown of Norway in favor of the King of Sweden as part of the Treaty of Kiel.

=== Thirty Years' War ===
In 1625, as part of the Thirty Years' War, Christian IV, who was also the Duke of Holstein, agreed to help the Lutheran rulers of neighbouring Lower Saxony against the forces of the Holy Roman Empire by intervening militarily. Denmark's cause was aided by France, which, together with England, had agreed to help subsidize the war. Christian had himself appointed war leader of the Lower Saxon Alliance and raised an army of 20,000–35,000 mercenaries. Christian, however, was forced to retire before the combined forces of Imperial generals Albrecht von Wallenstein and Tilly. Wallenstein's army marched north, occupying Mecklenburg, Pomerania, and ultimately Jutland. However, lacking a fleet, he was unable to take the Danish capital on the island of Zealand. Peace negotiations were concluded in the Treaty of Lübeck in 1629, which stated that Christian IV could keep his control over Denmark-Norway if he would abandon his support for the Protestant German states.

== Great Britain and Ireland ==
The Reformation in Britain and Ireland was launched by King Henry VIII of England's breach with the Roman Catholic Church in 1533. At that time, there was only a small number of Protestants among the general population, and most of them were living in the towns which were located in the South and the East of England. After the state-ordered break with the Pope in Rome, the Church in England, Wales and Ireland was placed under the rule of the King and Parliament.

The first major changes in doctrine and practice took place under Vicar-General Thomas Cromwell, and the newly appointed Protestant-leaning Archbishop of Canterbury, Thomas Cranmer. The first challenge to the institution of these reforms came from Ireland, where "Silken" Thomas Fitzgerald cited the controversy to justify his armed uprising of 1534. The young Fitzgerald failed to gain much local support, however, and in October a 1,600-strong army of English and Welshmen arrived in Ireland, along with four modern siege guns. The following year Fitzgerald was blasted into submission, and in August he was induced to surrender.

Shortly after this episode, local resistance to the reforms emerged in England. The dissolution of the monasteries, which began in 1536, provoked a violent northern Catholic rebellion in the Pilgrimage of Grace, which was eventually put down with much bloodshed. The reformation continued to be imposed on an often unwilling population with the aid of stern laws that made it treason, punishable by death, to oppose the King's actions with respect to religion. The next major armed resistance took place in the Prayer Book Rebellion of 1549, which was an unsuccessful rising in western England against the enforced substitution of Cranmer's English language service for the Latin Catholic Mass.

Following the restoration of Catholicism under Queen Mary I of England in 1553, there was a brief unsuccessful Protestant rising in the south-east of England.

=== Scottish Reformation ===
The Reformation in Scotland began in conflict. Fiery Calvinist preacher John Knox returned to Scotland in 1560, having been exiled for his part in the assassination of Cardinal Beaton. He proceeded to Dundee where a large number of Protestant sympathisers and noblemen had gathered. Knox was declared an outlaw by the Queen Regent, Mary of Guise, but the Protestants went at once to Perth, a walled town that could be defended in case of a siege. At the church of St John the Baptist, Knox preached a fiery sermon that provoked an iconoclastic riot. A mob poured into the church and it was entirely gutted. In the pattern of Calvinist riots in France and the Netherlands, the mob then attacked two friaries in the town, looting their gold and silver and smashing images. Mary of Guise gathered those nobles loyal to her and a small French army.

With Protestant reinforcements arriving from neighbouring counties, the queen regent retreated to Dunbar. By now, Calvinist mobs had overrun much of central Scotland, destroying monasteries and Catholic churches as they went. On 30 June, the Protestants occupied Edinburgh, though they were only able to hold it for a month. Even before their arrival, the mob had already sacked the churches and the friaries. On 1 July, Knox preached from the pulpit of St Giles', the most influential in the capital.

Knox negotiated by letter with William Cecil, 1st Baron Burghley, Elizabeth's chief advisor, for English support. When additional French troops arrived in Leith, Edinburgh's seaport, the Protestants responded by retaking Edinburgh. This time, on 24 October 1559, the Scottish nobility formally deposed Mary of Guise from the regency. Her secretary, William Maitland of Lethington, defected to the Protestant side, bringing his administrative skills. For the final stage of the revolution, Maitland appealed to Scottish patriotism to fight French domination. Support from England finally arrived and by the end of March, a significant English army joined the Scottish Protestant forces. The sudden death of Mary of Guise in Edinburgh Castle on 10 June 1560 paved the way for the signing of the Treaty of Edinburgh, and the withdrawal of French and English troops from Scotland, leaving the Scottish Calvinists in control on the ground. Catholicism was forcibly suppressed.

The return of Mary, Queen of Scots, to Scotland in 1560, led to further tension between her and the Protestant Lords of the Congregation. Mary claimed to favour religious toleration on the French model, however, the Protestant establishment feared a reestablishment of Catholicism, and sought English help to neutralise or depose Mary. Mary's marriage to a leading Catholic precipitated Mary's half-brother, the Earl of Moray, to join with other Protestant Lords in open rebellion. Mary set out for Stirling on 26 August 1565 to confront them. Moray and the rebellious lords were routed and fled into exile; the decisive military action became known as the Chaseabout Raid. In 1567, Mary was captured by another rebellious force at the Battle of Carberry Hill and imprisoned in Loch Leven Castle, where she was forced to abdicate the Scottish throne in favour of her one-year-old son James. Mary escaped from Loch Leven the following year, and once again managed to raise a small army. After her army's defeat at the Battle of Langside on 13 May, she fled to England, where she was imprisoned by Queen Elizabeth. Her son James VI was raised as a Protestant, later becoming King of England as well as Scotland.

The Rising of the North from 1569 to 1570 was an unsuccessful attempt by Catholic nobles from Northern England to depose Queen Elizabeth I and replace her with Mary, Queen of Scots.

=== English Civil War ===
England, Scotland and Ireland, in personal union under the Stuart king, James I & VI, continued Elizabeth I's policy of providing military support to European Protestants in the Netherlands and France. King Charles I decided to send an expeditionary force to relieve the French Huguenots whom Royal French forces held besieged in La Rochelle. However, tax-raising authority for these wars was getting harder and harder to raise from parliament.

In 1638 the Scottish National Covenant was signed by aggrieved Presbyterian lords and commoners. A Scottish rebellion, known as the Bishops War, soon followed, leading to the defeat of a weak royalist counter-force in 1640. The rebels went on to capture Newcastle upon Tyne, further weakening King Charles' authority.

In October 1641, a major rebellion broke out in Ireland. Charles soon needed to raise more money to suppress this Irish Rebellion. Meanwhile, English Puritans and Scottish Calvinists intensely opposed the king's main religious policy of unifying the Church of England and the Church of Scotland under a form of High Church Anglicanism. This, its opponents believed, was far too catholic in form, and based on the authority of bishops.

The English parliament refused to vote enough money for Charles to defeat the Scots without the King giving up much of his authority and reforming the English church along more Calvinist lines. The king refused, and deteriorating relations led to the outbreak of war in 1642. The first pitched battle of the war, fought at Edgehill on 23 October 1642, proved inconclusive, and both the Royalists and Parliamentarians claimed it as a victory. The second field action of the war was a stand-off at Turnham Green, and Charles was forced to withdraw to Oxford, which would serve as his base for the remainder of the war.

In general, the early part of the war went well for the Royalists. The turning point came in the late summer and early autumn of 1643, when the Earl of Essex's army forced the king to raise the siege of Gloucester and then brushed the Royalist army aside at the First Battle of Newbury on 20 September 1643. In an attempt to gain an advantage in numbers, Charles negotiated a ceasefire with the Catholic rebels in Ireland, freeing up English troops to fight on the Royalist side in England. Simultaneously Parliament offered concessions to the Scots in return for their aid and assistance.

With the help of the Scots, Parliament won at Marston Moor (2 July 1644), gaining York and much of the north of England. Oliver Cromwell's conduct in this battle proved decisive, and demonstrated his leadership potential. In 1645 Parliament passed the Self-denying Ordinance, by which all members of either House of Parliament laid down their commands, allowing the re-organization of its main forces into the New Model Army. By 1646 Charles had been forced to surrender himself to the Scots, and the parliamentary forces were in control of England. Charles was executed in 1649, and the monarchy was not restored until 1660. Even then, religious strife continued through the Glorious Revolution and thereafter.

=== Ireland ===
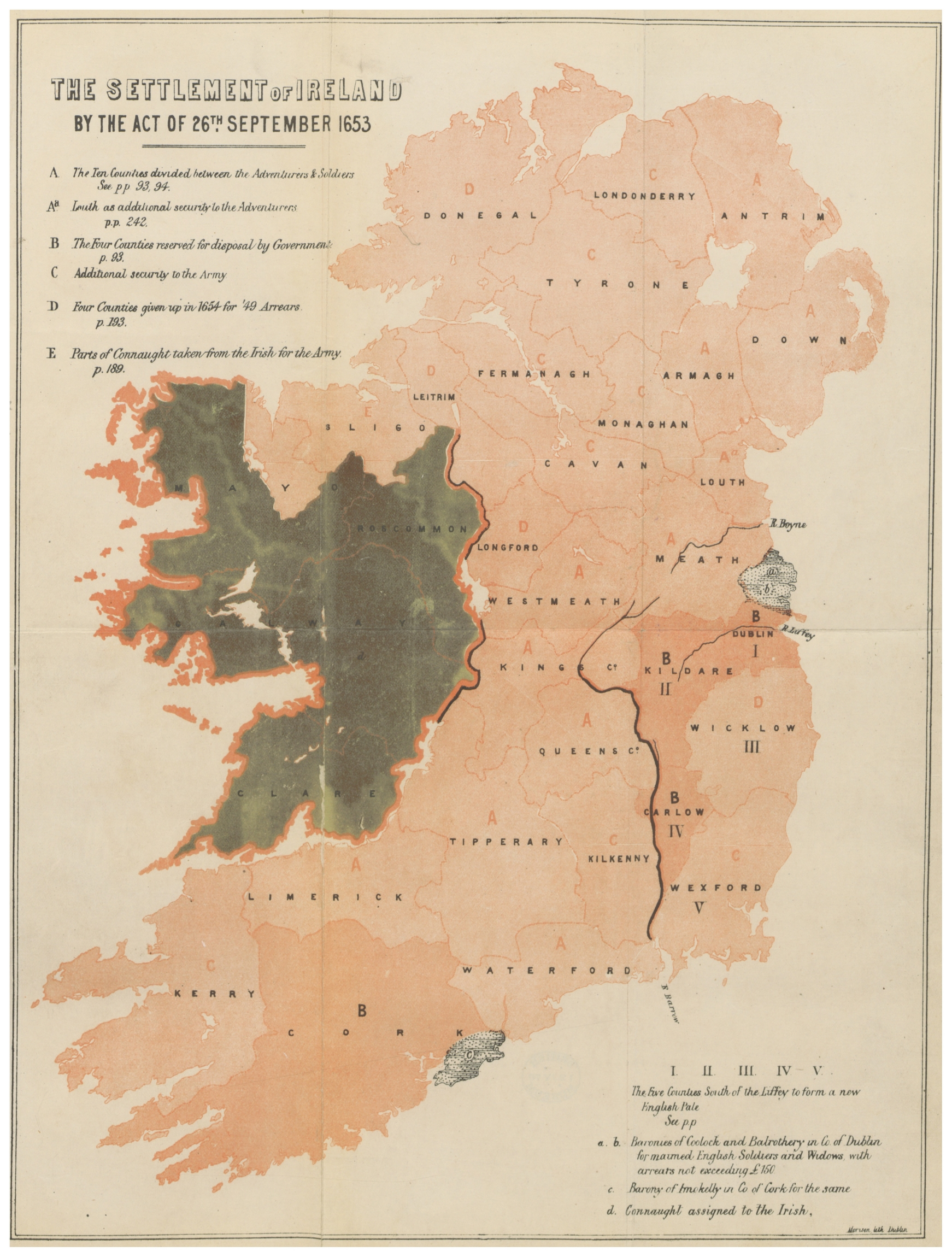
After Cromwell's victory, huge areas of land were confiscated and the Irish Catholics were banished to the lands of Connacht.

The wars of religion in Ireland took place in the context of a country that had already rebelled frequently against English rule in the previous decades. In 1534, Thomas Fitzgerald, known as Silken Thomas, led what was called the Silken Thomas Rebellion. In the province of Ulster in the North of the country, Shane O'Neill's Rebellion occurred from 1558 to 1567, and in the South of the Country, the Desmond Rebellions occurred in 1569–1573 and 1579–1583 in the province of Munster.

Ireland entered into a continuous state of war with the rebellion of 1641, with most of the island controlled by the Irish Confederates. Increasingly threatened by the armies of the English Parliament after Charles I's arrest in 1648, the Confederates signed a treaty of alliance with the English Royalists. The joint Royalist and Confederate forces under the Duke of Ormonde attempted to eliminate the Parliamentary army holding Dublin, but their opponents routed them at the Battle of Rathmines (2 August 1649). As the former Member of Parliament Admiral Robert Blake blockaded Prince Rupert's fleet in Kinsale, Oliver Cromwell could land at Dublin on 15 August 1649 with an army to quell the Royalist alliance in Ireland.

Cromwell's suppression of the Royalists in Ireland during 1649 still has a strong resonance for many Irish people. The siege of Drogheda and massacre of nearly 3,500 people—comprising around 2,700 Royalist soldiers and all the men in the town carrying arms, including civilians, prisoners, and Catholic priests—became one of the historical memories that has driven Irish-English and Catholic-Protestant strife during the last three centuries. However, the massacre has significance mainly as a symbol of the Irish perception of Cromwellian cruelty, as far more people died in the subsequent guerrilla warfare and scorched-earth fighting in the country than at infamous massacres such as Drogheda and Wexford. The Parliamentarian conquest of Ireland ground on for another four years until 1653, when the last Irish Confederate and Royalist troops surrendered. Historians have estimated that up to 30% of Ireland's population either died or had gone into exile by the end of the wars. The victors confiscated almost all Irish Catholic-owned land in the wake of the conquest and distributed it to the Parliament's creditors, to the Parliamentary soldiers who served in Ireland, and to English people who had settled there before the war.

=== Scotland ===
The execution of Charles I altered the dynamics of the Civil War in Scotland, which had raged between Royalists and Covenanters since 1644. By 1649, the struggle had left the Royalists there in disarray, and their erstwhile leader, the Marquess of Montrose, had gone into exile. However, Montrose, who had raised a mercenary force in Norway, later returned but did not succeed in raising many Highland clans, and the Covenanters defeated his army at the Battle of Carbisdale in Ross-shire on 27 April 1650. The victors captured Montrose shortly afterwards and took him to Edinburgh. On 20 May, the Scottish Parliament sentenced him to death and had him hanged the next day.

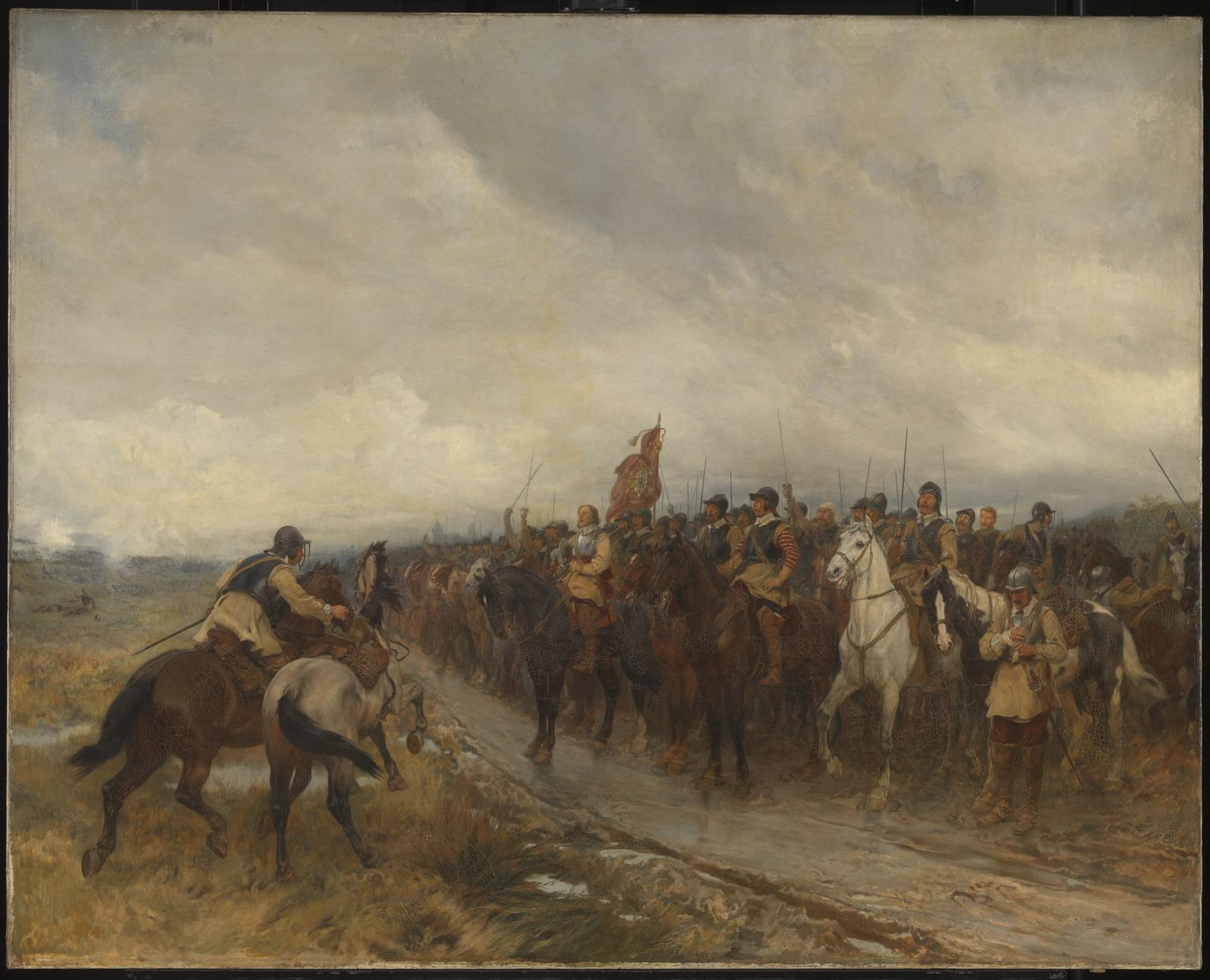
Cromwell at Dunbar, by Andrew Carrick Gow

Charles II landed in Scotland at Garmouth in Moray on 23 June 1650 and signed the 1638 National Covenant and the 1643 Solemn League and Covenant immediately after coming ashore. With his original Scottish Royalist followers and his new Covenanter allies, King Charles II became the greatest threat facing the new English republic. In response to the threat, Cromwell left some of his lieutenants in Ireland to continue the suppression of the Irish Royalists and returned to England.

Cromwell arrived in Scotland on 22 July 1650 and proceeded to lay siege to Edinburgh. By the end of August disease and a shortage of supplies had reduced his army, and he had to order a retreat towards his base at Dunbar. A Scottish army, assembled under the command of David Leslie, tried to block the retreat, but Cromwell defeated them at the Battle of Dunbar on 3 September. Cromwell's army then took Edinburgh, and by the end of the year, his army had occupied much of southern Scotland.

In July 1651, Cromwell's forces crossed the Firth of Forth into Fife and defeated the Scots at the Battle of Inverkeithing (20 July 1651). The New Model Army advanced towards Perth, which allowed Charles, at the head of the Scottish army, to move south into England. Cromwell followed Charles into England, leaving George Monck to finish the campaign in Scotland. Monck took Stirling on 14 August and Dundee on 1 September. In 1652, the army finished off the remnants of Royalist resistance, under the terms of the "Tender of Union".

In late 1688, William of Orange successfully invaded England. After the Convention of Estates deposed the Catholic king James VII on 11 April 1689, they offered the royal title to William and his wife Mary (the Protestant daughter of James), which they accepted on 11 May 1689. During the subsequent Jacobite rising of 1689, instigated by James' Roman Catholic and Anglican Tory supporters, the Calvinist forces in the south and lowlands of Scotland triumphed. Despite this defeat, many Scottish Highland clans remained either Catholic or Episcopalian in sympathy. The Catholic Clan MacDonald was subject to the 1691 Glencoe Massacre for being late in pledging loyalty to the new Protestant king William II. Highland clans also rallied to the support of Catholic claimants to the British throne in later, failed Jacobite risings of the erstwhile Stuart King James III in 1715 and Charles Edward Stuart in 1745.

=== Other ===
- The Pilgrimage of Grace was a popular rising in Yorkshire in 1536–37 against Henry VIII's break with the Roman Catholic Church.
- Bigod's rebellion was an armed rebellion by English Roman Catholics in Cumberland and Westmorland against King Henry VIII of England and the English Parliament.
- Prayer Book Rebellion (1549)
- Rising of the North (1569–1570)
- Desmond Rebellions (1569–1573, 1579–1583)
- Monmouth Rebellion (1685)

== Death tolls ==
These figures include the deaths of civilians from diseases, famine, etc., as well as deaths of soldiers in battle and massacres and genocide.

Lowest estimate	Highest estimate	Event	Location	From	To	Duration	Main opponents*	Character
4,000,000	12,000,000	Thirty Years' War	Holy Roman Empire	1618	1648	30 years	Protestants (mainly Lutherans, Reformed and Hussites) against Catholics	began as a religious war; quickly became a French–Habsburg political clash
2,000,000	4,000,000	French Wars of Religion	France	1562	1598	36 years	Protestants (mainly Reformed) against Catholics	began as a religious war, and largely remained such
315,000	868,000 (616,000 in Ireland)	War of the Three Kingdoms	Great Britain and Ireland	1639	1651	12 years	Protestants (Anglicans, Reformed, various other nonconformists), Catholics distributed in various factions of the war	civil, religion-state relation and religious freedom issues, with a national element
600,000	700,000	Eighty Years' War	Low Countries in the Holy Roman Empire	1568	1648	80 years	Protestants (mainly Reformed) against Catholics	conflicts over religion (and taxes and privileges) evolved into a war of independence
100,000	200,000	German Peasants' War	Holy Roman Empire	1524	1525	1 year	Protestants (mainly Anabaptists), Catholics against Protestants (mainly Lutherans), Catholics	mixed economic and religious reasons, war between peasants and Protestant/Catholic landowners

The wars listed were the most severe in casualties; the remaining religious conflicts in Europe lasted for only a few years, a year, or less and/or were much less violent. Huguenot rebellions were possibly the most damaging conflict after the German Peasants' War and may have taken up to 100,000 lives.

== See also ==
- Concordat of Worms
- English Reformation
- Long Reformation
- Northern Crusades
- Ottoman wars in Europe

== Bibliography ==
- Burgess, Glenn (1998). "Was the English Civil War a War of Religion? The Evidence of Political Propaganda". Huntington Library Quarterly. 61 (2). University of California Press: 173–201. doi:10.2307/3817797. JSTOR 3817797.
- Greengrass, Mark. The European Reformation 1500–1618. Longman, 1998. ISBN 0-582-06174-1
- Jouanna, Arlette; Boucher, Jacqueline; Biloghi, Dominique; Thiec, Guy (1998). Histoire et dictionnaire des Guerres de religion. Collection: Bouquins (in French). Paris: Laffont. ISBN 2221074254.
- MacCulloch, Diarmaid. The Reformation: A History. New York: Penguin 2003.
- MacGregor, Geddes (1957), The Thundering Scot, Philadelphia: The Westminster Press, OCLC 740182.
- Nolan, Cathal J. (2006). The Age of Wars of Religion, 1000–1650: An Encyclopedia of Global Warfare and Civilization, Volume 2. London: Greenwood Publishing Group. p. 1076. ISBN 978-0313337345.
- Onnekink, David (2013). War and Religion after Westphalia, 1648–1713. Ashgate Publishing. pp. 1–8. ISBN 9781409480211.
