= Piedmontese Easter =

Series of massacres on Waldensians in Piedmont, Italy

- Part of the Savoyard–Waldensian Wars
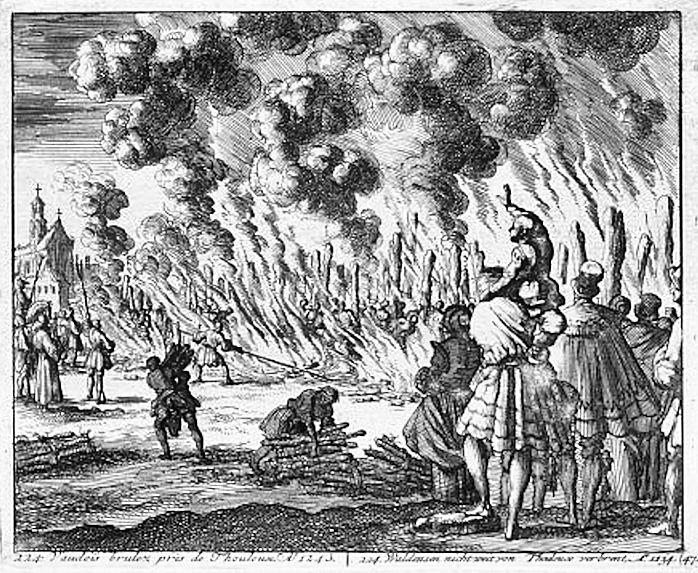
Date	April 1655
Location	Piedmont, Duchy of Savoy

Belligerents
Duchy of Savoy	Waldensian rebels

Commanders and leaders
(Duchy of Savoy) Charles Emmanuel II	Joshua Janavel; Jean Léger; Bartolomeo Jahier

Strength
15,000+ soldiers	

The Piedmontese Easter (Italian: Pasque piemontesi, French: Pâques piémontaises or Pâques vaudoises) was a series of massacres of Waldensians (also known as Waldenses or Vaudois) by Savoyard troops in the Duchy of Savoy in 1655.

== Background ==
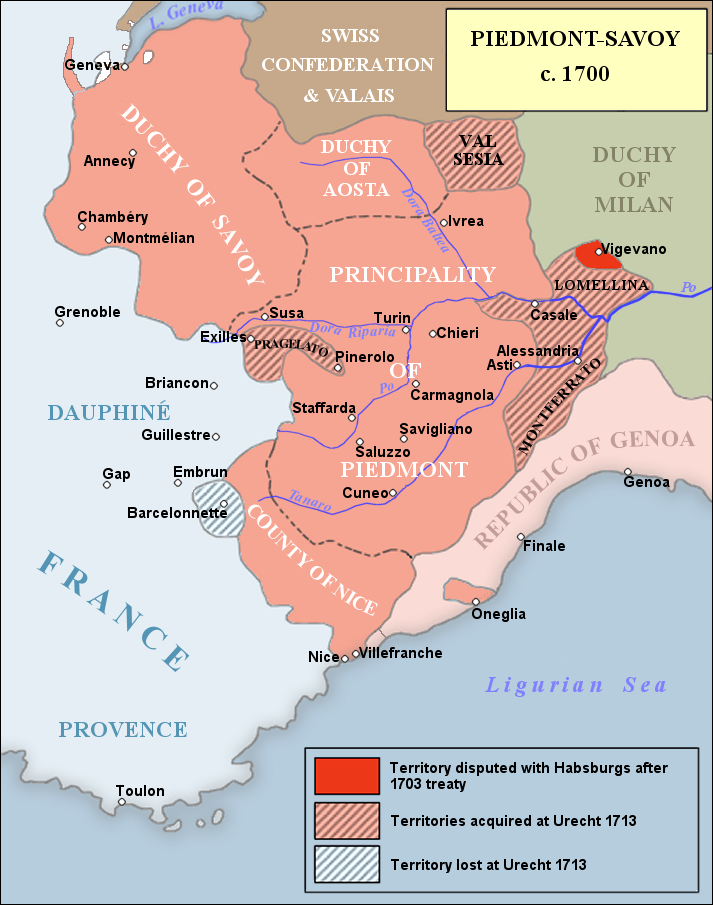
Duchy of Savoy (1700) including Piedmont.

Alexis Muston, a 19th-century French Protestant pastor based in Bordeaux, claimed in L'Israel des Alpes (Paris 1852) that neither Duke Charles Emmanuel II of Savoy nor the Waldensians themselves had sought to wage war, and both parties were content with maintaining the peace. It was due to the constant pressure exerted by New Council of Propagation of the Faith and the Extermination of Heresy (Concilium Novum de Propaganda Fide et Extirpandis Haereticis), an institution of the Catholic Church established in Turin in 1650, that regularly convened in the palace of the Archbishop of Turin.

Although the Waldensian population (numbering around 15,000 in 1685) in certain areas of Piedmont had held privileges of tolerance and freedom of belief and conscience for centuries that were written down in several documents, these long-established rights for Protestant Italians were being violated by new decrees passed by Andrea Gastaldo, member of the council. Two decrees in particular threatened the continued existence of Waldensian communities in Piedmont: the Edict of 15 May 1650, abrogating the old Waldensian privileges, and the Edict of 25 January 1655, which was in fact a religious expulsion order:

That every head of a family, with the individuals of that family, of the reformed religion, of what rank, degree, or condition soever, none excepted inhabiting and possessing estates in Lucerne, St. Giovanni, Bibiana, Campiglione, St. Secondo, Lucernetta, La Torre, Fenile, and Bricherassio, should, within three days after the publication thereof, withdraw and depart, and be withdrawn out of the said places, and translated into the places and limits tolerated by his highness during his pleasure; particularly Bobbio, Angrogne, Vilario, Rorata, and the county of Bonetti. And all this to be done on pain of death, and confiscation of house and goods, unless within the limited time they turned Catholics.

== Events ==
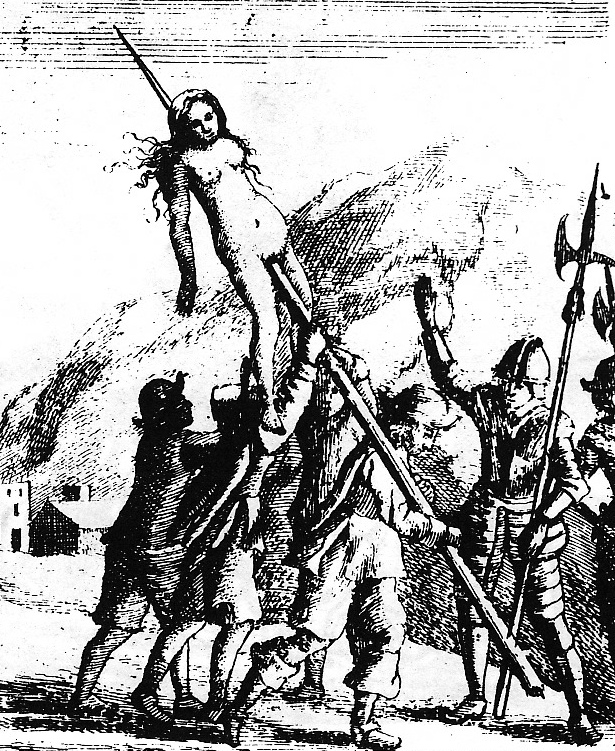
A young woman, said by the artist to be Anna, the daughter of Giovanni Charboniere of La Torre, being impaled by Savoyan soldiers.

The Waldensian refusal to obey the Edict of 25 January 1655 led the government to send troops to plunder and burn Waldensian houses, and to station over 15,000 soldiers in their valleys. The Savoyard army consisted of local soldiers, as well as French and Irish troops, under the command of the Marquis of Pianezza.

On 24 April 1655, the Piedmontese Easter Massacre commenced: a massacre of thousands of Waldensian civilians (4,000 to 6,000 according to one estimate) was committed by ducal troops.

This caused a mass exodus of Waldensian refugees to the Valley of Perosa (Pérouse), and led to the formation of rebel groups under the leadership of Joshua Janavel, Jean Léger and Bartolomeo Jahier, whilst several states including England, France, German states, and the Protestant cantons of Switzerland attempted to intervene diplomatically. On 18 August, the Pinerolo Declaration of Mercy was issued, which constituted a peace treaty between Charles Emmanuel II and the Waldensians.

Estimates of how many Waldensians were killed during the Piedmontese Easter vary widely, including "more than a thousand", "4,000 to 6,000", and "6,000".

== Impact ==
Reports from the massacres spread quickly throughout Protestant Europe, sparking outrage, especially in Britain. Lord Protector Oliver Cromwell threatened the Duchy of Savoy with intervention, somewhat shaping the military decisions made by the Duke. English poet John Milton was inspired to write the sonnet "On the Late Massacre in Piedmont".
