= Luserna San Giovanni =

- Comune
- Comune di Luserna San Giovanni
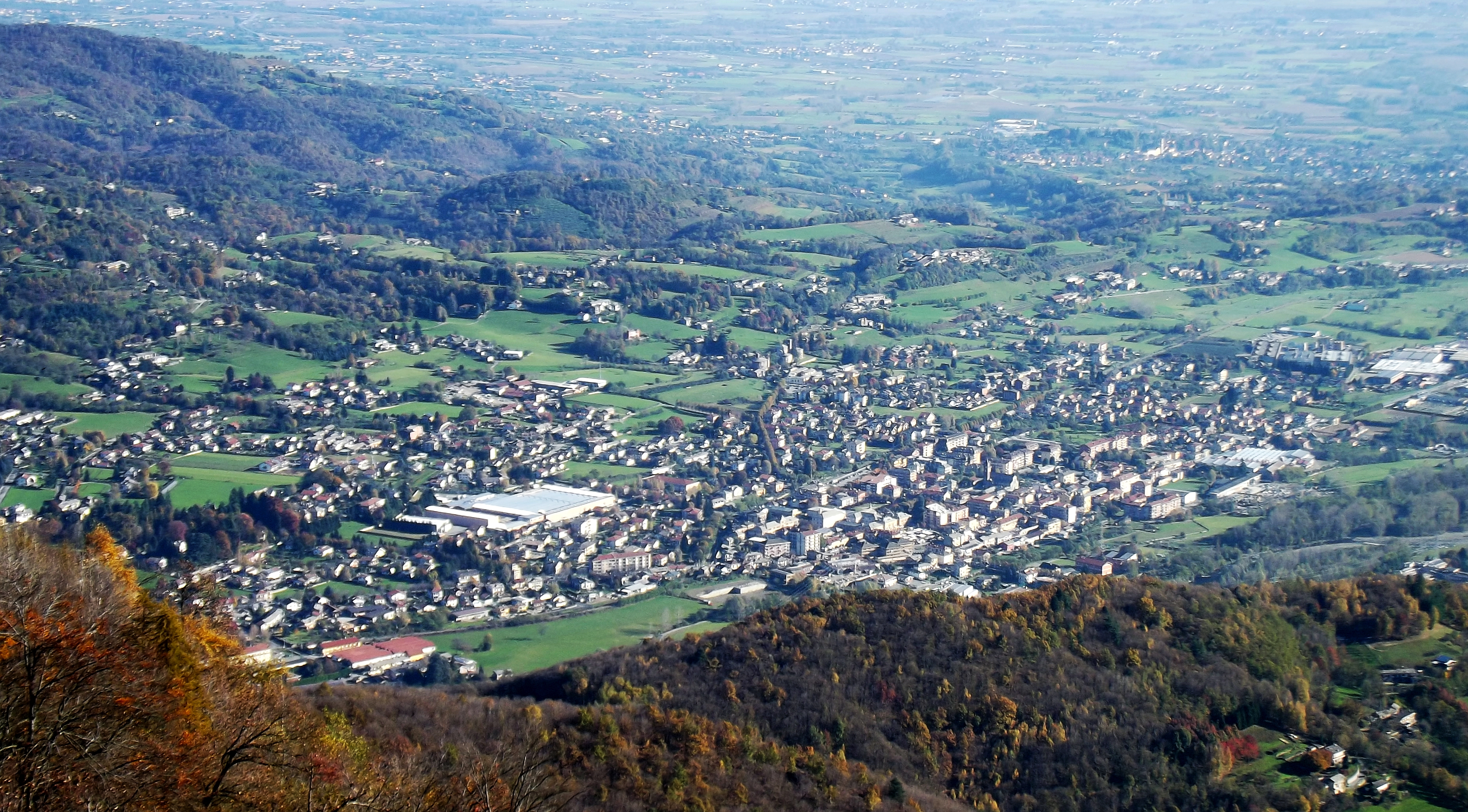

- Coat of arms

- Location within Italy Location within Piedmont
- Coordinates: 44°49′N 7°15′E
- Country: Italy
- Region: Piedmont
- Metropolitan city: Turin (TO)
- Frazioni: Airali, Luserna, San Giovanni, Baussan, Boer, Jallà, Pecoul, Ricoun, Saret

Government
  - Mayor: Duillio Canale

Area
  - Total: 17.74 km^{2} (6.85 sq mi)

Population (30 September 2017)
  - Total: 7,252
  - Density: 408.8/km^{2} (1,059/sq mi)
- Demonym: Lusernesi
- Time zone: UTC+1 (CET)
  - Summer (DST): UTC+2 (CEST)
- Postal code: 10062
- Dialing code: 0121
- Website: Official website

Luserna San Giovanni (Occitan: Luzerna e San Jan, Piedmontese: Luserna e San Gioann, French: Lucerne Saint-Jean) is a comune (municipality) in the Metropolitan City of Turin in the Italian region Piedmont, located in the Val Pellice about 45 kilometres (28 mi) southwest of Turin.

Luserna San Giovanni borders the following municipalities: Angrogna, Bricherasio, Torre Pellice, Bibiana, Lusernetta, Rorà, and Bagnolo Piemonte.

== History ==
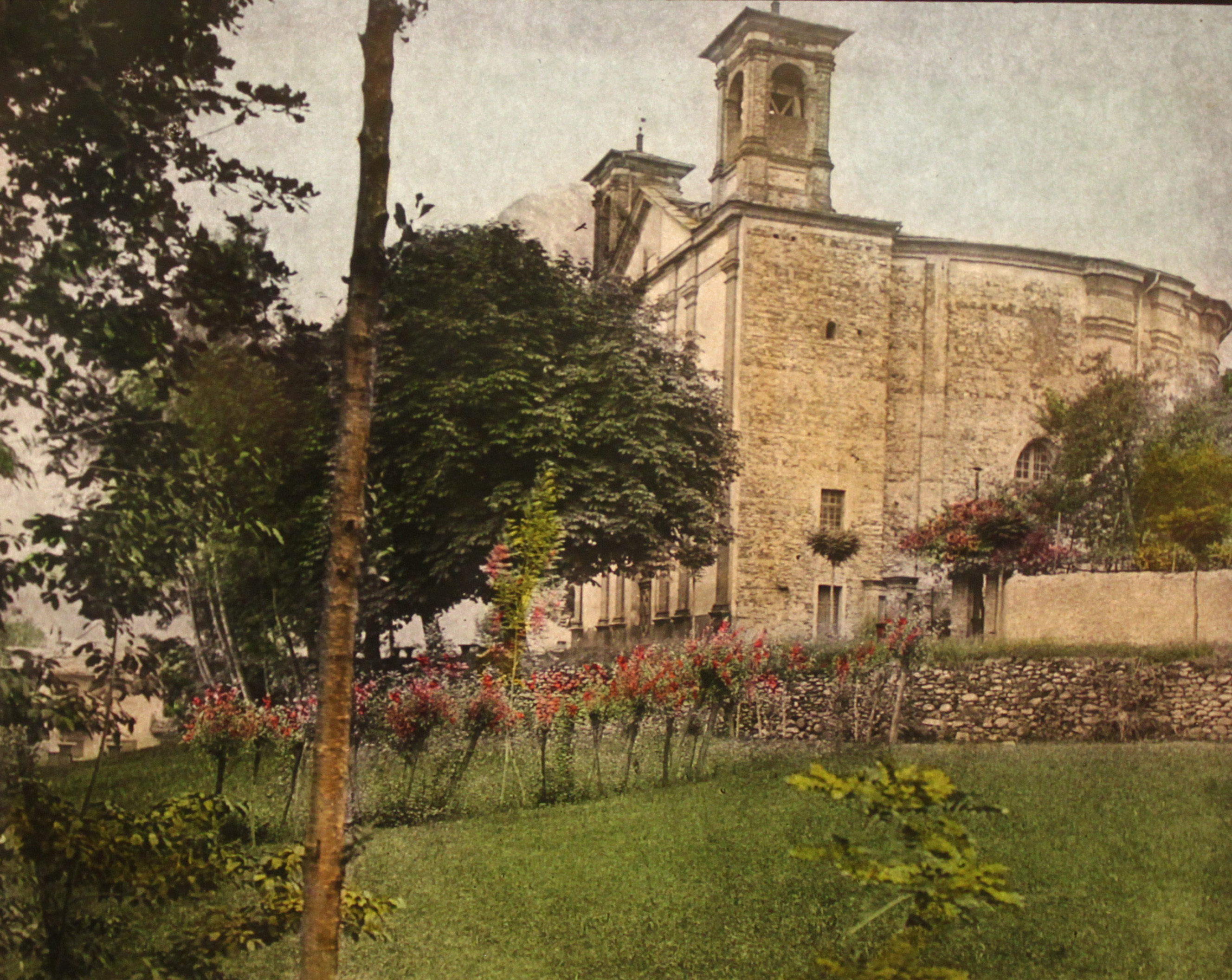
Church in San Giovanni

Until a merger in 1872, San Giovanni and Luserna were separate villages. Caffarel, an Italian chocolate conglomerate, was founded in the area in 1826.

== Twin towns – sister cities ==
Luserna San Giovanni is twinned with:

- Prievidza, Slovakia
- Savines-le-Lac, France
- Colonia Valdense, Uruguay
