= Sergey Balovin =

Russian artist (born 1984)

Sergey Balovin (born 5 July 1984, Voronezh, Russia) is a visual artist and curator. In 2011, to escape the conventional application of monetary value to art, he started the popular "In Kind Exchange" project in which he is exchanging artworks for useful presents. The project has attracted a lot of attention around the world. In 2013 he started his money-free world tour with "In Kind Exchange", traveling the world and swapping portraits for flight tickets, food, accommodation, without spending any money. Since 2015 Sergey Balovin has been working with Claudia Beccato, Italian gastronome and artist. In 2016 Sergey Balovin is on the list of the Database and Analytics of Russian Contemporary Art as 20th of the Top 100 young artists and as 16th according to the list of People's rating.

== Biography ==
Sergey Balovin grew up in Voronezh, in western Russia in a family of geologists and studied fine art from a very young age. In 1996 he graduated from Fine Art School and in 2005 graduated from Art Faculty of the Voronezh State Pedagogical University. At 17 years old he went on to teach art at Studio I, School of Architecture and Design. Four years later, he began working at the Pedagogical University, teaching painting and organizing group exhibitions featuring young artists from Voronezh. His class soon began a creative and associative meeting point for students. Due to clear limitations in Russian academic education, and being greatly inspired by French, German, and Belgian artists encountered, he taught himself contemporary art.

From 2008 to 2010 he curated the "Petit" project with Louise Morin in which they featured several dozen artists from Europe, Asia, and America. The project participants reflected on the topic of "mobility" and created artworks around this theme. More than a hundred pieces were placed in a single suitcase, enabling the curators to cross country borders and represent this "contraband art". The project united some dozens of artists form Russia, France, Germany, Austria, Belgium, Poland, China, USA, Brazil and was presented in France, Germany, Russia, and China, including Moscow International Biennale for Young Art, Red Gate Residency in Beijing and Art Labor Gallery in Shanghai.

In 2009 Sergey Balovin was invited to Jinan, China, to open his solo show—about a hundred paintings reflecting Chinese stereotype views of Russian contemporary art. The series of deliberately beautiful landscapes with golden frames was a parody of 19th-century Russian painting. The artworks were successfully sold in a few days and the artist decided to move to China to improve his financial well-being. But he soon realized he was becoming more focused on consumer demand than his art vision. He decided to cease sales and, to prevent himself from repeating past mistakes, he performed «Euthanasia», a radical act, destroying his entire oil landscape exhibition, which had been painted according to consumer taste, with a bulldozer (an allusion to the Bulldozer Exhibition). The «Euthanasia» project was represented in IFA Gallery.

In 2010, refusing to put a price on his artworks, he launched "In Kind Exchange" where he drew portraits and exchanged them for currency-free presents. In 2011 his "In Kind Exchange" project was selected for Sergey Kuryokhin Modern Art Award and in 2012 the artist was in residence at Swatch Art Peace Hotel. The project got amazing feedback in social media and he soon began to receive invitations from all over the world from people who wanted their portraits done. In 2013 finally ready, he started his Money Free World Trip, painting for food, lodging, and transportation. The journey ensuing lasted 17 months and covered 36 countries and created over 5,000 portraits and got the same amount of gifts in return.

Since 2015 he has been working with Claudia Beccato. They met on Sergey Balovin's "In Kind Exchange" tour in Europe. In the summer of 2016, they got married at Dukley European Art Community in Kotor, during their art residency program. They celebrated their money-free wedding, opening the exhibition "The Wedding [as it should be]." The artists represented with collage on canvas all the elements of a classical wedding, without possessing anything and spending any penny.

== In Kind Exchange ==
"In Kind Exchange" is an interactive art project by artists Sergey Balovin and Claudia Beccato, which consists in the barter of their art to everything they need for living, from food to technologies, from clothes to flight tickets.

In 2011 the project was nominated for Sergey Kuryokhin Modern Art Award.

=== Description of the project ===
Offering a visual artwork (usually it's a portrait), the artists receive a useful present in return. Differently from the traditional barter dynamics, “In Kind Exchange” consists in an exchange in which the two parties (the user and the artists) do not discuss the value of the exchanged objects. The project expects mutual appreciation and respect. The artist does not guarantee realistic portrait of the model and the choice of the present is at the user's discretion. There is a “wish list” redacted by Claudia Beccato and Sergey Balovin that helps people choosing among the artists needs. The economic value of the gift does not alter the size and the quality of the artwork.

=== Origins and development of the project ===
The idea of the “In-Kind Exchange” project came to Sergey Balovin in Shanghai in 2011, when he moved to a new and empty apartment. He started to swap his drawings in exchange for furniture and household appliances with a neighbor about to move out. Soon the artist systematized the process of exchange, publishing on social media invitations to take part in the project. The participants met the artist e chose one of the two or three ink sketches made, offering in exchange whatever they believe could be useful to the artist's apartment. In few months the artist was able to furnish his apartment with the presents got by barter. He got everything, from dishes to furniture and household appliances. Therefore, the artist realized the possibility to live with the only exchange system and started to organize performances focused on different needs: from food to clothes (titles of some performances: “Feed the Artist”, “Dress up the Artist”, and “Get the artist drunk”).

In 2012 Sergey Balovin won the competition to participate in the Swatch Art Peace Hotel residency program. For 6 months he lived in a luxury apartment and worked in his studio in the downtown of Shanghai.

Continuing to barter for his living, he began to live without money. After the publication of his article “One Day of the man who refused money” on Livejournal, he got a lot of feedback from all over the world, positive and negative. He started to receive invitations from all the continents from people who wanted to take part in the project.

So in 2012, he planned a new experiment: his money-free world tour in “In-Kind Exchange”.

The trip lasted 17 months. Sergey Balovin traveled the world, from East to West, visiting 36 Countries. He exchanged portraits for food, flight tickets, and accommodation without spending any penny.

In 2015 the project made Sergey Balovin meet Claudia Beccato, who became his wife. The next stage of the In-Kind Exchange was their wedding without money. They celebrated their wedding by opening the exhibition “The Wedding [as it should be]” at European Dukley Art Community in Kotor, Montenegro. Not a penny was spent on the celebration and all the traditional wedding material attributes were present on the walls as collages. After the opening, there was a party and all the food was exchanged. “The Wedding [as it should be]” is a grotesque representation of the consumer society.

It is estimated that since his launch, the “In-Kind Exchange” project has involved 8,000 people.

=== Interesting facts ===
Among the most unusual presents received in exchange for a portrait are a drum set, a gold medal karate, and a strip dance. Among the most expensive: MacBook Air, iPhone 5S, Round the World flight ticket (Shanghai - Mexico City - Buenos Aires - Santiago - Moscow – Shanghai). Among the most useless: expired driver's license, a lighter (presented by the Minister of Culture of Bosnia and Herzegovina), several dozen artist portraits. Among the famous people involved in the "barter": the Minister of Finance of Switzerland Amman Schneider, the Minister of Culture of Bosnia and Herzegovina, Oleg Garkusha, designer Artemy Lebedev, Marat Gelman, blogger Ilya Varlamov, composer Grigory Gladkov, film director Eldar Salavatov, traveler-presenter Andrey Ponkratov, traveller-photographer Sergey Dolya.

Russian Forbes named Sergey Balovin among the 5 people in the World who «refused money and did not die».

In 2016 Sergey Balovin and Claudia Beccato invented a new portrait technique which consists in painting the model's face over a black and white photo of an alien person.

== Press ==
1. "Воронежский художник Сергей Баловин борется с капитализмом", TV Kultura, 6 July 2011
2. "Натуральный обмен. Проект художника Сергея Баловина", Museums News of Saint Petersburg, 13 August 2011
3. "Один день из жизни в „нехорошей квартирке“", XXL, 22 March 2012
4. Сергей Баловин. Интервью, Россия 24 News, 17 April 2012
5. "Портрет в обмен на сок, пирог, печенья и сканворд", 48.RU, 25 April 2012
6. "Euthanasia", IFA Gallery, Shanghai, 30 June 2012
7. "Schneider Ammann beendet Mission mit Farbtupfer", Swissinfo, 13 July 2012
8. "Ipak se od umjetnosti živjeti može!", Ziher, 27 March 2013
9. "Piktori shëtitës, portret në këmbim të një dhurate ", MAPO, 8 April 2013
10. "«Утро»: художник Сергей Баловин", Moscow 24, 4 March 2013
11. "Портрет без монет. Воронежский художник путешествует без денег", AIF, 27 3 July 2013
12. "Украинские СМИ назвали известного воронежского художника бомжом", Моё, 15 February 2013
13. "Sergey Balovin’s ‘In Kind Exchange’: Russian Portrait Artist Lives... ", The Huffington Post 26 March 2013
14. "Russian Artist Sergey Balovin and the In-Kind Exchange Project: How He Lives Without Money", YAHOO!, 28 March 2013
15. "Сергей Баловин: Художник не должен голодать", Arterritory, 2 August 2013
16. "Of Bulldozers and Nail Houses ", P.I.G. China, 7 December 2012
17. "Painting portraits to sustain a lifestyle with no money", Visual News, 25 March 2013
18. "Get the picture", South China Morning Post, 27 June 2013
19. "Russian Artist Living on No Income", The Echo, 15 April 2013
20. "Artista demuestra que es posible vivir y viajar sin dinero", Mariana Tiquet, Mexico, 18 July 2014
21. "Sergey Balovin, the artist who’s travelling the world without money", Mumbai DNA, 29 June 2014
22. "Feed the artist and get your portrait made. ", Contemporary Food Lab, 2015
23. "Вокруг света без денег: Художник путешествует по миру за портреты", Тут и там, 17 February 2016
24. "Обменный пункт, Псковская Губерния", Gubernia online, 11 July 2016
25. "Izložba i svadba: Neobičan projekat Sergeja Balovina u Kotoru", Crna Gora, 13 August 2016
26. "Сметана, творог и что-то исконно псковское", ПЛН, 29 June 2016
27. "Arte e coraggio di Sergey Balovin", My Personal Mind, 6 November 2016
28. "Sergej Balovin večeras predstavlja svoj rad sarajevskoj publici", Depo, 30 August 16
29. "Sergej Balovin gost sarajevske ‘Čarlame ’", Federalna TV, Sarajevo, 28 August 2016
30. "Artisti (russi) di tutto il mondo, benvenuti in Montenegro", alfabeta2, 4 December 2016

=== For In Kind Exchange ===
1. "Sergej Balovin večeras predstavlja svoj rad sarajevskoj publici", Depo, 30 August 16
2. "Sergej Balovin gost sarajevske ‘Čarlame ’", Federalna TV, Sarajevo, 28 August 2016
3. "Artisti (russi) di tutto il mondo, benvenuti in Montenegro", alfabeta2, 4 December 2016
4. "Обменный пункт, Псковская Губерния", Gubernia online, 11 July 2016
5. "Izložba i svadba: Neobičan projekat Sergeja Balovina u Kotoru", Crna Gora, 13 August 2016
6. "Сметана, творог и что-то исконно псковское", ПЛН, 29 June 2016
7. "Russian Artist Living on No Income", The Echo, 15 April 2013
8. "Artista demuestra que es posible vivir y viajar sin dinero", Mariana Tiquet, Mexico, 18 July 2014
9. "Sergey Balovin, the artist who’s travelling the world without money", Mumbai DNA, 29 June 2014
10. "Feed the artist and get your portrait made. ", Contemporary Food Lab, 2015
11. "Russian Artist Sergey Balovin and the In-Kind Exchange Project: How He Lives Without Money ", YAHOO!, 28 March 2013
12. "Sergey Balovin’s ‘In Kind Exchange’: Russian Portrait Artist Lives... ", The Huffington Post 26 March 2013
13. "Ipak se od umjetnosti živjeti može!", Ziher, 27 March 2013
14. "Один день из жизни в „нехорошей квартирке“", XXL, 22 March 2012
15. Сергей Баловин. Интервью, Россия 24 News, 17 April 2012

== Links ==
Balovin&Beccato website
