= Joshua Janavel =

Italian military leader and defender of the church

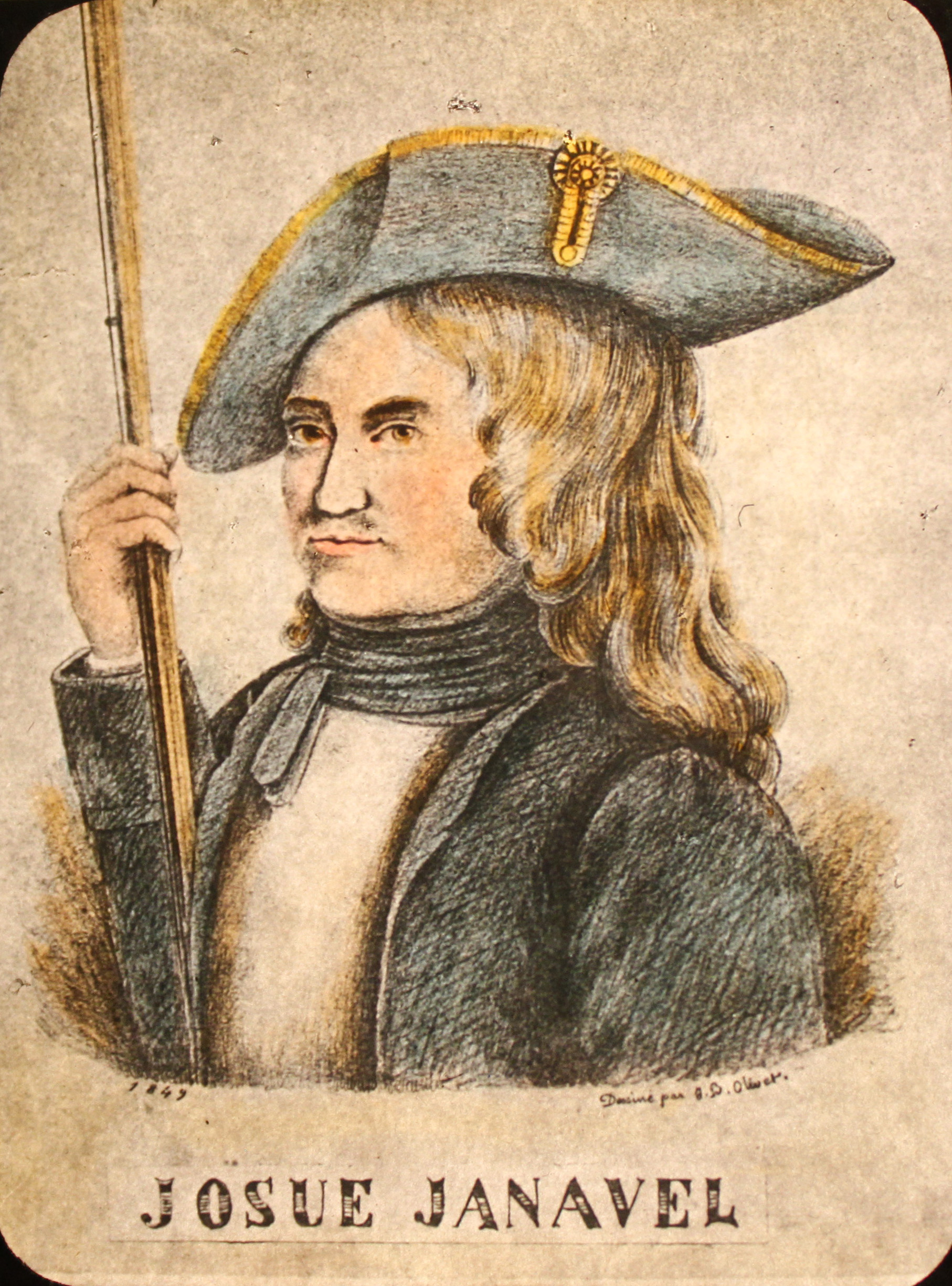
1895 portrait of Joshua Janavel.

Joshua Janavel, also written Giosuè Gianavello (1617 – 5 March 1690) was an Italian condottiero and defender of the Waldensian Evangelical Church. He was involved in the Piedmontese Easter of 1655, and in the Glorious Homecoming of 1689.

Born in Rorà, Janavel was a relatively prosperous farmer until his life took a sharp turn in 1655. In that year the Duke of Savoy launched a military operation against the Waldensian population with the intent of eradicating Protestantism from the region.

Janavel led the defense of Rorà, and succeeded in repelling the Savoyard assault. For the courage which he displayed at this battle, he became known as "the Lion of Rora" and "the captain of the valleys". However, the resistance did not endure for long. The Waldensians were defeated in the Valle Germanasca on 10 May, and Janavel was forced into exile, settling in Queyras. Notwithstanding threats against his family and a bounty of three hundred ducats on his head, Janavel soon returned to reorganize the Waldensian insurgents, together with Barthelemy Jahier.

Janavel and Jahier led various actions leading up to 18 June 1655, when Savoyard forces attacked Angrogna. The Waldensians weathered the initial assault and managed to counterattack, but during the counterattack Janavel was gravely wounded, and had to be transported to Inverso Pinasca.

Bowing to international pressure, Duke Charles Emmanuel II ended the campaign against the Waldensians and restored the status quo ante. Janavel continued to lead the underground Waldensian resistance. Over the following years he mounted a number of guerrilla attacks against Savoyard forces, and his house served as a base of operations and general quarters for the insurgency. The duchy punished him with banishment and a death sentence. On 6 July 1663 the Savoyards again attacked Angrogna, but were defeated. The Waldensian community desired an end to war, and agreed to the conditions of the Duke of Savoy, which stipulated the exile of Janavel and his soldiers. A Waldensian synod disavowed Janavel, and he was sent into exile in Switzerland. In Geneva he was welcomed as a Protestant hero, and maintained contacts with his native valley. Despite being under surveillance by the local authorities, as well as by Savoyard spies, he made at least two clandestine visits to his native country.

In 1686, Janavel was joined by a fresh wave of Waldensian refugees fleeing the persecutions of Victor Amadeus II of Savoy. Together they began actively planning a mass return of Waldensians, which took the form of the Glorious Homecoming of 1689. By this time Janavel was too old to take part personally in the action, but he played a prominent role as an organizer; notably, he drafted the military orders governing the group's conduct during the operation.

Janavel died of edema in Geneva on 5 March 1690.

Janavel's house, known as la Gianavella, exists to this day. After passing through various owners, it was acquired by the Waldensian Evangelical Church and converted into a museum.
