= Alexis Muston =

French-Italian pastor (1810–1888)

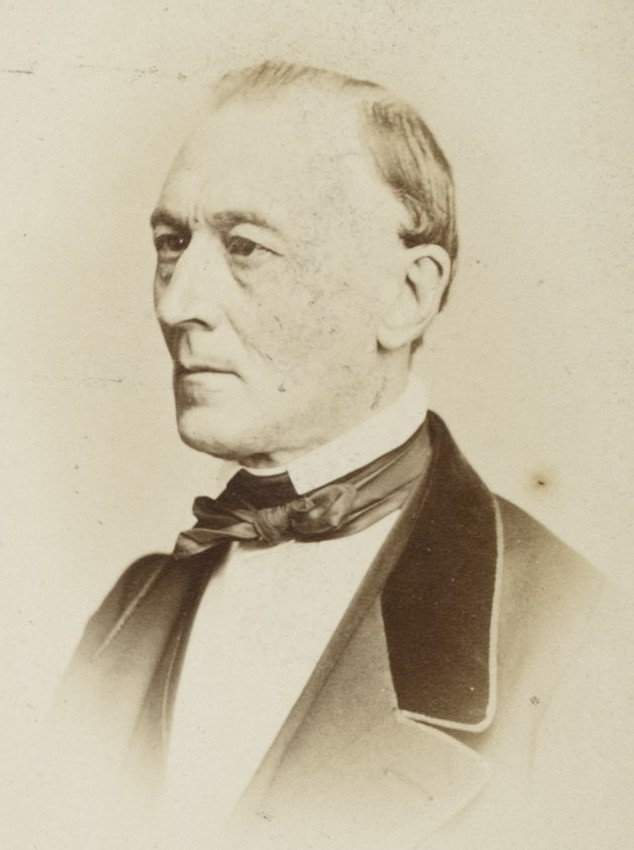
- Photograph of Alexis Muston, 1880.
- Born: 11 February 1810
- Died: 9 April 1888 (age 78)
- Education: University of Strasbourg
- Occupations: Pastor, historian

Alexis Muston (11 February 1810 – 6 April 1888) was a French-Italian pastor and historian. He wrote a journal between 1825 and 1887.

== Biography ==
Alexis Muston was born in Torre Pellice, Piedmont, Italy, on 11 February 1810. He was the son of Georges Muston (1777–1842), a pastor, and his wife Madeleine Jahier (1782–1848).

Muston studied theology in Lausanne and Strasbourg, graduating in 1834 with a bachelor's thesis about the origins of the Waldensians movement. He was consecrated as a priest in 1833.

Muston was initially a priest of the Waldensian Evangelical Church in Rodoretto, a hamlet in the municipality of Prali, Italy. In 1835, he was forced to flee to France because his book about the Waldensians contradicted that of the Bishop of Pinerolo. He lived in Bourdeaux, where he became pastor of the Reformed Church of Bourdeaux. He held this position until his death. Muston died in Bourdeaux in April 1888, aged 78.

== Relationship with Georg Büchner ==
In 1831, Muston became friends with the German playwright Georg Büchner, as both were students in Strasbourg. Muston travelled to Darmstadt to research his thesis in 1833, and Büchner served as his translator.

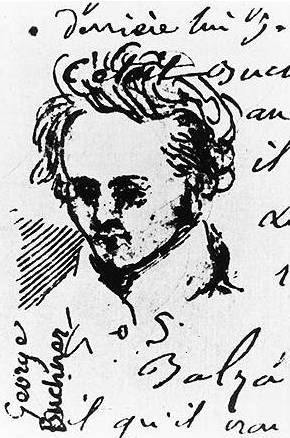
One of the drawings of Büchner created by Muston

Two of the few existing portraits of Büchner were created by Muston; the first in his sketchbook, dated October 1833, the second in a manuscript, date unknown.

Muston described Büchner in his diary as being "passionate about freedom", and "above all a poet".

== Sources ==
- Hennig, Mareike; Struck, Neela (2022). "Freundschaftsbild und Freundschaftsausgabe". Zeichnen im Zeitalter Goethes (in German). Munich: Hirmer Verlag. ISBN 978-3-7774-3976-1.
