= National Register of Historic Places listings in Burke County, North Carolina =

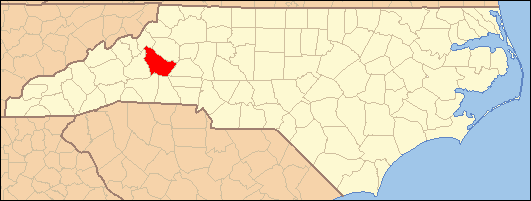

This list includes properties and districts listed on the National Register of Historic Places in Burke County, North Carolina. Click the "Map of all coordinates" link to the right to view an online map of all properties and districts with latitude and longitude coordinates in the table below.

== Current listings ==
This National Park Service list is complete through NPS recent listings posted May 1, 2026.

| | Name on the Register | Image | Date listed | Location | City or town | Description |
|---|---|---|---|---|---|---|
| 1 | Avery Avenue Historic District | Avery Avenue Historic District | November 9, 1987 (#87001915) | Roughly along parts of Avery, Lenoir, Morehead, Walker, Evans, & Short Sts. 35°45′11″N 81°41′18″W | Morganton | |
| 2 | Avery Avenue School | Avery Avenue School | November 9, 1987 (#87001925) | 200 Avery Ave. 35°44′52″N 81°41′14″W | Morganton | |
| 3 | Alphonse Calhoun Avery House | Alphonse Calhoun Avery House | July 12, 1984 (#84001947) | 408 N. Green St. 35°44′53″N 81°41′36″W | Morganton | |
| 4 | Bellevue | Bellevue | December 4, 1973 (#73001296) | On SR 1419, N of Morganton off NC 18; 35°46′55″N 81°42′33″W | Morganton | |
| 5 | Broughton Hospital Historic District | Broughton Hospital Historic District | November 9, 1987 (#87001918) | Roughly bounded by Broughton Hospital campus, NC 18, Bickett St., & Enola Rd. 35°43′39″N 81°40′40″W | Morganton | |
| 6 | Burke County Courthouse | Burke County Courthouse | April 17, 1970 (#70000443) | Courthouse Sq. 35°44′44″N 81°41′07″W | Morganton | |
| 7 | Creekside | Creekside | February 1, 1972 (#72000926) | West of Morganton at the junction of U.S. Route 70 and U.S. Route 70 Alternate; 35°44′07″N 81°42′31″W | Morganton | |
| 8 | Dale's, USB Market | Dale's, USB Market | November 9, 1987 (#87001924) | Jct. of Enola Rd. & Dale St. 35°43′33″N 81°40′20″W | Morganton | |
| 9 | Jean-Pierre Auguste Dalmas House | Jean-Pierre Auguste Dalmas House | May 2, 2002 (#02000444) | 4950 Villar Lane, NE; 35°45′28″N 81°33′50″W | Valdese | |
| 10 | Dunavant Cotton Manufacturing Company | Dunavant Cotton Manufacturing Company | May 1, 2013 (#13000227) | 109 E. Fleming Dr. 35°44′29″N 81°40′50″W | Morganton | |
| 11 | Jacob Forney Jr. House | Jacob Forney Jr. House | October 14, 1976 (#76001309) | NW of Morganton on SR 1440; 35°48′01″N 81°43′10″W | Morganton | |
| 12 | Franklin-Penland House | Franklin-Penland House | November 28, 2006 (#06001106) | 8646 NC 183; 35°57′11″N 81°56′12″W | Linville Falls | |
| 13 | Gaither House | Gaither House | April 23, 1976 (#76001310) | 102 N. Anderson St. 35°44′29″N 81°41′33″W | Morganton | |
| 14 | Garrou-Morganton Full-Fashioned Hosiery Mills | Garrou-Morganton Full-Fashioned Hosiery Mills | January 27, 1999 (#99000064) | 101 and 105 Lenoir St. 35°44′51″N 81°41′13″W | Morganton | |
| 15 | Gaston Chapel | Gaston Chapel | October 11, 1984 (#84000077) | 100 Bouchelle St. 35°44′51″N 81°41′14″W | Morganton | |
| 16 | Gilboa Methodist Church | Gilboa Methodist Church | October 11, 1984 (#84000075) | U.S. 64; 35°41′17″N 81°43′45″W | Salem | |
| 17 | Henry River Mill Village Historic District | Henry River Mill Village Historic District | May 9, 2019 (#100003929) | 4216-4283 Henry River Rd. 35°41′48″N 81°25′45″W | Hildebran | |
| 18 | Hunting Creek Railroad Bridge | Hunting Creek Railroad Bridge | November 9, 1987 (#87001923) | Hunting Creek north of U.S. Routes 64 and 70, between the junction of Stonebridge Rd. and E. Union St. 35°45′05″N 81°39′31″W | Morganton | |
| 19 | Jonesboro Historic District | Jonesboro Historic District | November 9, 1987 (#87001916) | Roughly bounded by W. Concord, Bay, Jones, Lytle, and S. Anderson Sts. 35°44′20″N 81°41′22″W | Morganton | |
| 20 | John Alexander Lackey House | John Alexander Lackey House | November 9, 1987 (#87001921) | 102 Camelot Dr. 35°46′05″N 81°43′07″W | Morganton | |
| 21 | Linville Falls Tavern (former) | Linville Falls Tavern (former) | December 28, 2000 (#00001554) | 25 Rock House Ln. 35°57′32″N 81°56′34″W | Linville Falls | Now Famous Louise's Rock House Restaurant. Extends into Avery County as well as McDowell County. |
| 22 | Magnolia Place | Magnolia Place | June 4, 1973 (#73001297) | S of Morganton on U.S. Route 64; 35°43′04″N 81°41′38″W | Morganton | Boundary decrease approved January 25, 2018 |
| 23 | Morganton Downtown Historic District | Morganton Downtown Historic District | November 9, 1987 (#87001930) | E. Union, S. Green, N. and S. Sterling, and King and Queen Sts. 35°44′45″N 81°41′16″W | Morganton | |
| 24 | Mountain View | Mountain View | October 11, 1984 (#84000076) | 604 W. Union St. 35°44′23″N 81°41′50″W | Morganton | |
| 25 | North Carolina School for the Deaf Historic District | North Carolina School for the Deaf Historic District | April 20, 1989 (#89000325) | Jct. US 70 and US 64; 35°43′47″N 81°41′17″W | Morganton | |
| 26 | North Carolina School for the Deaf: Main Building | North Carolina School for the Deaf: Main Building | December 12, 1976 (#76001311) | U.S. 64 and Fleming Dr. 35°43′47″N 81°41′25″W | Morganton | |
| 27 | North Green Street-Bouchelle Street Historic District | North Green Street-Bouchelle Street Historic District | November 9, 1987 (#87001926) | N. Green, Bouchelle, & Patterson Sts. 35°44′55″N 81°41′31″W | Morganton | |
| 28 | Pineburr Hosiery Mill | | April 9, 2025 (#100011657) | 408 Pineburr Avenue SE; 35°44′16″N 81°33′29″W | Valdese | |
| 29 | Quaker Meadows | Quaker Meadows | October 3, 1973 (#73001298) | West of Morganton off NC 181; 35°45′27″N 81°43′14″W | Morganton | |
| 30 | Quaker Meadows Cemetery | Quaker Meadows Cemetery | November 9, 1987 (#87001922) | Off NC 126; 35°45′06″N 81°43′18″W | Morganton | |
| 31 | Dr. Joseph Bennett Riddle House | Dr. Joseph Bennett Riddle House | December 20, 1984 (#84000524) | 411 W. Union St. 35°44′24″N 81°41′37″W | Morganton | |
| 32 | Sloan-Throneburg Farm | Sloan-Throneburg Farm | March 1, 2002 (#02000110) | NC 1429, 0.3 miles W of jct. with NC 1450; 35°50′36″N 81°39′27″W | Chesterfield | |
| 33 | South King Street Historic District | South King Street Historic District | November 9, 1987 (#87001920) | S. King St. 35°44′34″N 81°41′12″W | Morganton | |
| 34 | Southern Railway Freight Station | Southern Railway Freight Station | December 29, 2020 (#100005993) | 630 South Green St. 35°44′30″N 81°40′56″W | Morganton | |
| 35 | Swan Ponds | | April 24, 1973 (#73001299) | About 4 miles W of Morganton off NC 126; 35°44′36″N 81°45′23″W | Morganton | |
| 36 | Tate House | Tate House | May 25, 1973 (#73001300) | 100 S. King St. 35°44′39″N 81°41′21″W | Morganton | |
| 37 | Franklin Pierce Tate House | Franklin Pierce Tate House | May 21, 1986 (#86001171) | 410 W. Union St. 35°44′26″N 81°41′41″W | Morganton | |
| 38 | Valdese Elementary School | Valdese Elementary School | October 25, 1984 (#84000115) | 400 Main St. 35°44′41″N 81°34′01″W | Valdese | |
| 39 | Waldensian Presbyterian Church | Waldensian Presbyterian Church | October 25, 1984 (#84000116) | 104 E. Main St. 35°44′34″N 81°33′45″W | Valdese | |
| 40 | Waldensian Swiss Embroidery Company–Valdese Weavers, Inc. Mill | | August 9, 2023 (#100009230) | 108 Praley St. SW; 35°44′39″N 81°33′58″W | Valdese | |
| 41 | Walker Top Baptist Church | | August 1, 2024 (#100010674) | 7442 Burkemont Road; 35°38′24″N 81°43′23″W | Morganton | |
| 42 | West Union Street Historic District | West Union Street Historic District | November 9, 1987 (#87001931) | Roughly parts of W. Union St., Montrose St., & Riverside Dr. 35°44′26″N 81°41′42″W | Morganton | |
| 43 | Western North Carolina Insane Asylum | Western North Carolina Insane Asylum | October 5, 1977 (#77000996) | Off NC 18; 35°43′50″N 81°40′30″W | Morganton | |
| 44 | White Street-Valdese Avenue Historic District | White Street-Valdese Avenue Historic District | November 9, 1987 (#87001927) | White St. and Valdese Ave. 35°44′50″N 81°40′51″W | Morganton | |

== Former listing ==
| | Name on the Register | Image | Date listed | Date removed | Location | City or town | Description |
|---|---|---|---|---|---|---|---|
| 1 | Pleasant Valley | | January 20, 1972 (#72000927) | October 6, 1977 | Jct. of SR 1423, 1439, and 1438 | Morganton vicinity | Destroyed by fire on September 22, 1977. |

== See also ==
- National Register of Historic Places listings in North Carolina
- List of National Historic Landmarks in North Carolina
