= Sloan House =

Sloan House may refer to:

- Sloan House (Prescott, Arizona). listed on the NRHP in Prescott, Arizona
- Sloan-Raymond-Fitch House, Wilton, Connecticut
- William B. Sloan House, Chicago, Illinois, built in 1910, designed by Walter Burley Griffin
- Sloan House, Glenview, Illinois, the first house known as a solar house, designed by George Fred Keck
- Dempster-Sloan House, Geneva, Nebraska, listed on the NRHP in Fillmore County, Nebraska
- Samuel Sloan House, Hightstown, New Jersey, listed on the NRHP in Mercer County, New Jersey
- Sloan Cottage, Saranac Lake, New York
- George B. Sloan Estate, Oswego, New York, listed on the NRHP in Oswego County, New York
- Dr. David Dickson Sloan Farm, Garland, North Carolina, listed on the NRHP in Sampson County, North Carolina
- Dr. Earl S. Sloan House, Trent Woods, North Carolina, listed on the NRHP in Craven County, North Carolina
- Sloan-Throneburg Farm, Chesterfield, North Carolina, listed on the NRHP in Burke County, North Carolina
- Rush R. Sloane House, Sandusky, Ohio, listed on the NRHP in Sandusky, Ohio
- John Sloan Homestead, Volin, South Dakota, listed on the NRHP in Yankton County, South Dakota
- Sloan–Parker House, Junction, West Virginia
- William P. Sloan House, Waukesha, Wisconsin, listed on the NRHP in Waukesha County, Wisconsin

== See also ==
- Sloane House (disambiguation)
