= Tate House =

Tate House may refer to:

- Tate House (Tate, Georgia), listed on the NRHP in Georgia
- Tate House (Ville Platte, Louisiana), listed on the NRHP in Louisiana
- Tate House (Portland, Maine), in Stroudwater area of Portland, Maine, listed on the NRHP in Maine
- Franklin Pierce Tate House in Morganton, North Carolina, listed on the NRHP in North Carolina
- Tate House (Morganton, North Carolina), listed on the NRHP in North Carolina
