= Jonesboro Historic District =

Jonesboro Historic District may refer to:

- Jonesboro Historic District (Jonesboro, Georgia), listed on the National Register of Historic Places (NRHP)
- Jonesboro Historic District (Morganton, North Carolina), listed on the NRHP in Burke County, North Carolina
- Jonesborough Historic District, Jonesborough, Tennessee
