= Sloane House =

Sloane House may refer to:

- Henry T. Sloane House in New York City
- Merestead, also known as Sloane Estate, in Mamaroneck, New York, United States, NRHP-listed
- Sloane House, Chelsea, a house in London, England
- Sloane House YMCA, New York, New York, United States, historic YMCA on West 34th Street
- Rush R. Sloane House, Sandusky, Ohio, United States, listed on the NRHP in Sandusky, Ohio
- W. B. Sloane House, Elmhurst, Illinois, United States an early house having a designed carport, designed by Walter Burley Griffin

== See also ==
- Sloan House (disambiguation)
