= Waldensian Church =

Waldensian Church may refer to:

- Waldensian Evangelical Church, a Protestant denomination active in Italy and Switzerland
- Union of Methodist and Waldensian Churches, an Italian united Protestant denomination
- Waldensian Church and Cemetery of Stone Prairie, a historic Waldensian church located near Monett, Barry County, Missouri, United States of America
- Waldensian Presbyterian Church, a historic Waldensian church in Valdese, Burke County, North Carolina, United States of America

== See also ==
- Waldensians
- Valdese (disambiguation)
