= Valdese =

Valdese may refer to:

- Valdese, North Carolina
- Valdese News
- Waldensians, Valdesi in Italian

== See also ==
- Valdez (disambiguation)
