= Samuel McDowell Tate =

Confederate colonel and businessman (1830–1897)

Samuel M. Tate
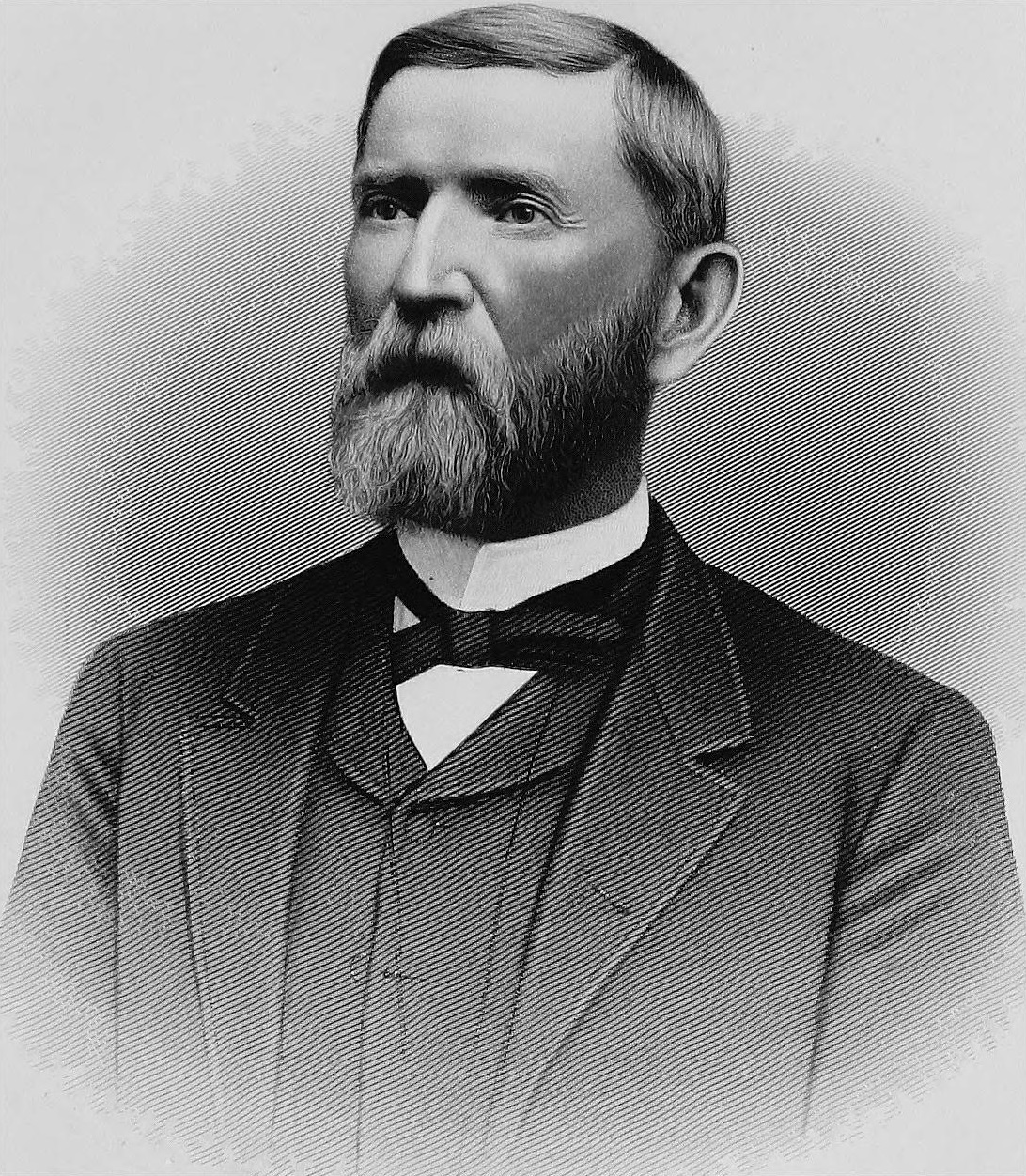

17th Treasurer of North Carolina
- In office 1892–1895

Personal details
- Born: September 8, 1830 Morganton, North Carolina, US
- Died: June 25, 1897 (aged 66) Morganton, North Carolina, US
- Party: Democratic
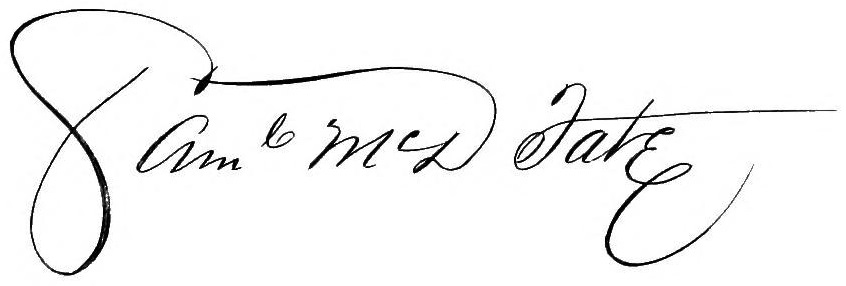
- Signature

Military service
- Allegiance: Confederate States
- Branch: Confederate States Army
- Rank: Lieutenant colonel
- Battles: American Civil War; Battle of First Manassas; Battle of Seven Pines; Battle of Gaines' Mill; Battle of Second Manassas; Battle of Sharpsburg; Battle of Chancellorsville; Battle of Gettysburg; Assault on Cemetery Hill; Second Battle of Rappahannock Station (WIA); Battle of Mine Run; Battle of Cedar Creek (WIA); Battle of Fort Stedman (WIA)

Samuel McDowell Tate (1830–1897) was an American businessman from Virginia who served as a lieutenant colonel in the Confederate States Army from North Carolina during the American Civil War, was a state legislator in North Carolina, and held federal offices.

== Early life ==
Samuel McDowell Tate, eldest son and child of David and Susan M. Tate, was born at Morganton, in Burke County, North Carolina, on September 8, 1830. His ancestry in both lines was a graft of French Protestants upon Scotch-Irish stock. He was denied a classical education, not for lack of means, but in consequence of the early death of his father.

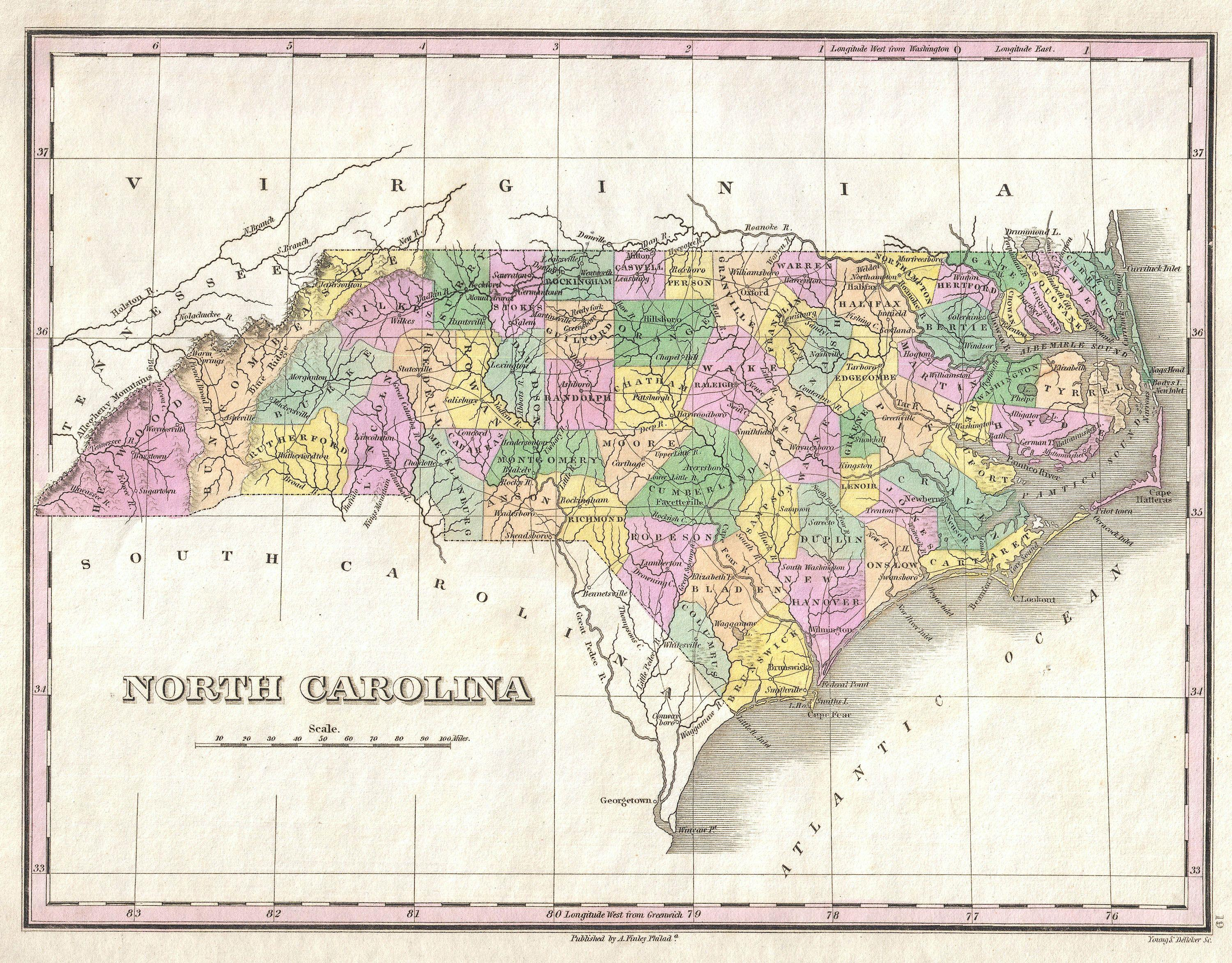
Finley's North Carolina, 1827

He was nonetheless well educated in the grammar schools of his native state and of Pennsylvania. He later became known as a writer of graceful and exact English, a cogent and sensible talker at all times, and sometimes a persuasive speaker. He read but few books, but of newspapers and reviews he was a voracious gleaner.

=== Travel and adventure ===
Before the age of the commercial traveler he saw the need for that class in business, and he lived some years in Philadelphia, fitting himself for the life of a merchant. He returned to North Carolina in the early 1850s and soon took the leading trade of the rich slaveholders of Burke and her tributary country.

Attacked by the Western fever which came at some time of life to many of the adventurous men of the Atlantic slope, he sought a taste of Texas experience and journeyed on pony express through the greater part of that state in the years 1855–1856, investing in real estate, much of which his heirs inherited.

When (later Confederate Colonel) Charles F. Fisher contracted to build the first section of the Western North Carolina Railroad from Salisbury to Morganton, Tate took service under him and as agent managed his financial interests.

== Civil War ==
=== Politics of secession ===
A Democrat and strongly partisan, he attended the Convention at Charleston, and later attended all the Conventions of his party save only that one which in 1872 nominated Horace Greeley for the Presidency. His sympathies were ardently Southern, and during the momentous year of 1860 he was greatly interested in all the political movements. Although much engrossed in railroad work, when U.S. President Abraham Lincoln called on North Carolina to furnish her quota of troops to coerce the seceded States, and Union Whigs and Secession Democrats vied with each other in rushing to the defense of their state, he abandoned his employment and answered the Confederate call to arms.

=== Early engagements, 1861–62 ===
While in April and the early days of May 1861, without waiting for the State to leave the Union, Vance was raising his "Rough and Ready Guards" across the mountains, and Thomas Settle with fife and drum was getting together his company in Rockingham, and William P. Bynum, already appointed lieutenant-colonel, was organizing his 2nd Regiment of State troops at Raleigh, Tate was hastily winding up his business and calling on his neighbors and friends to form a company to serve under the command of his enterprising chief, Colonel Charles F. Fisher.

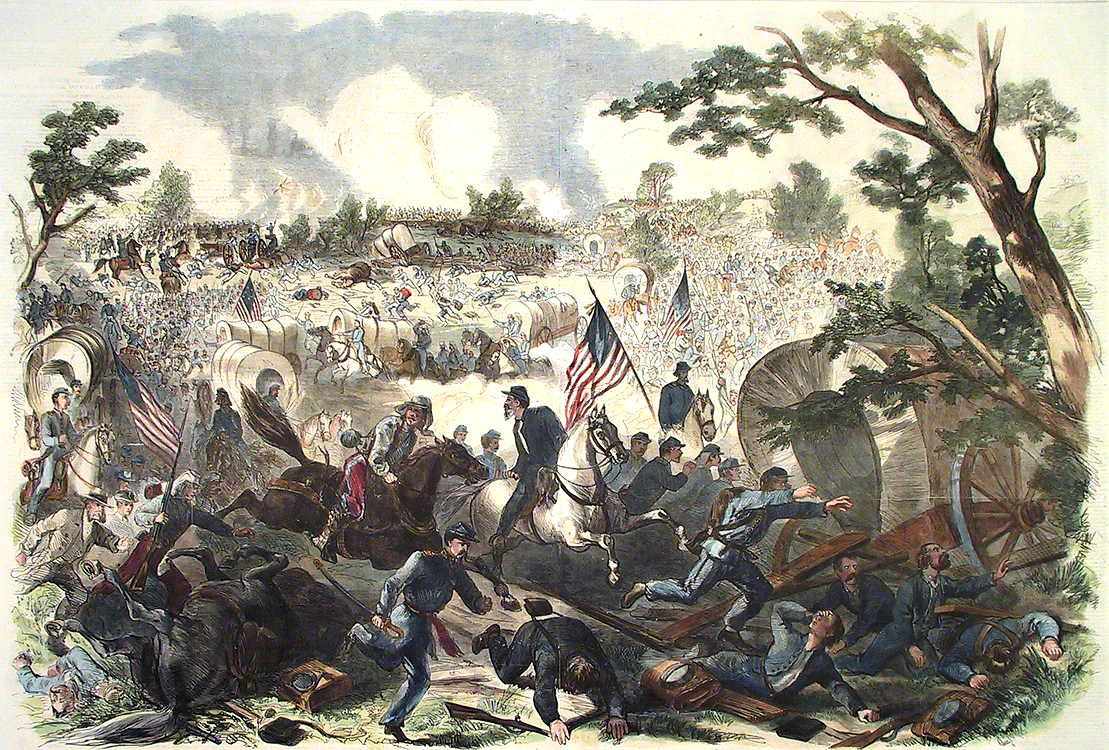
Retreat of the Federal Army upon Centreville, July 21, 1861 (c. 1862 wood engraving)

As Captain of Company D of the 6th Regiment he served in the Shenandoah Valley in Virginia, and on the morning of July 21 the regiment reached Manassas Junction just in time to render most important service. Disembarking and hearing the boom of distant cannon, they marched directly to the battlefield and were led to the front of the Henry House, near which Rickett's Battery was hurling its deadly missiles into the Confederate line. Within a few moments the guns of that battery were silenced and captured; but in that fatal charge Colonel Fisher was killed and hundreds of others had fallen. It was however the turning-point of the contest. Here it was that Bee, like Fisher, fell, calling on his men to stand firm against the heavy columns of the advancing enemy, pointing down the line to General Jackson and saying: "Look at Jackson, he stands like a stone wall!" But Kirby Smith then reached the field with other reinforcements, and the day was saved for the Confederates and that stampede began which made the battle of Manassas the first major battle of the war.

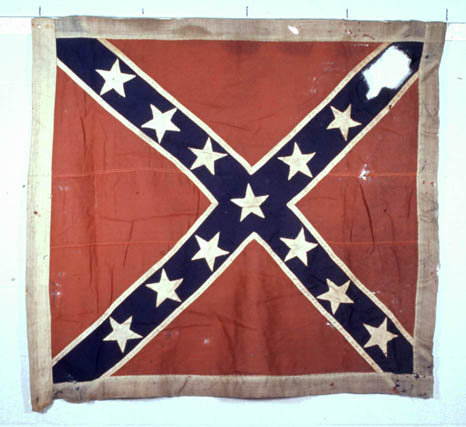
Battle flag of the 6th North Carolina Infantry

Colonel W. D. Pender was then appointed to succeed Fisher in the command of the 6th Regiment; and under him the regiment led the advance in the battle of Seven Pines, behaving with such gallantry that when the battle was over President Davis, who being on the field had witnessed its movements, saluting Colonel Pender said to him: "General Pender, your commission as brigadier bears date of to-day; I wish I could give it to you upon this field." The 6th North Carolina engaged the enemy at the first onset, and was the last upon the field. Captain Tate served with great distinction not only in these battles, but at Gaines' Mill and in other battles in the front of Richmond and at Second Manassas, ending that battle near the Henry House on the very ground where the regiment had fought on July 21, 1861; and there Captain Tate won his promotion and became major of his regiment.

At Sharpsburg his regiment did fine service; and after the battle of Fredericksburg it was assigned to a North Carolina brigade commanded by General R. F. Hoke.

=== Gettysburg campaign ===
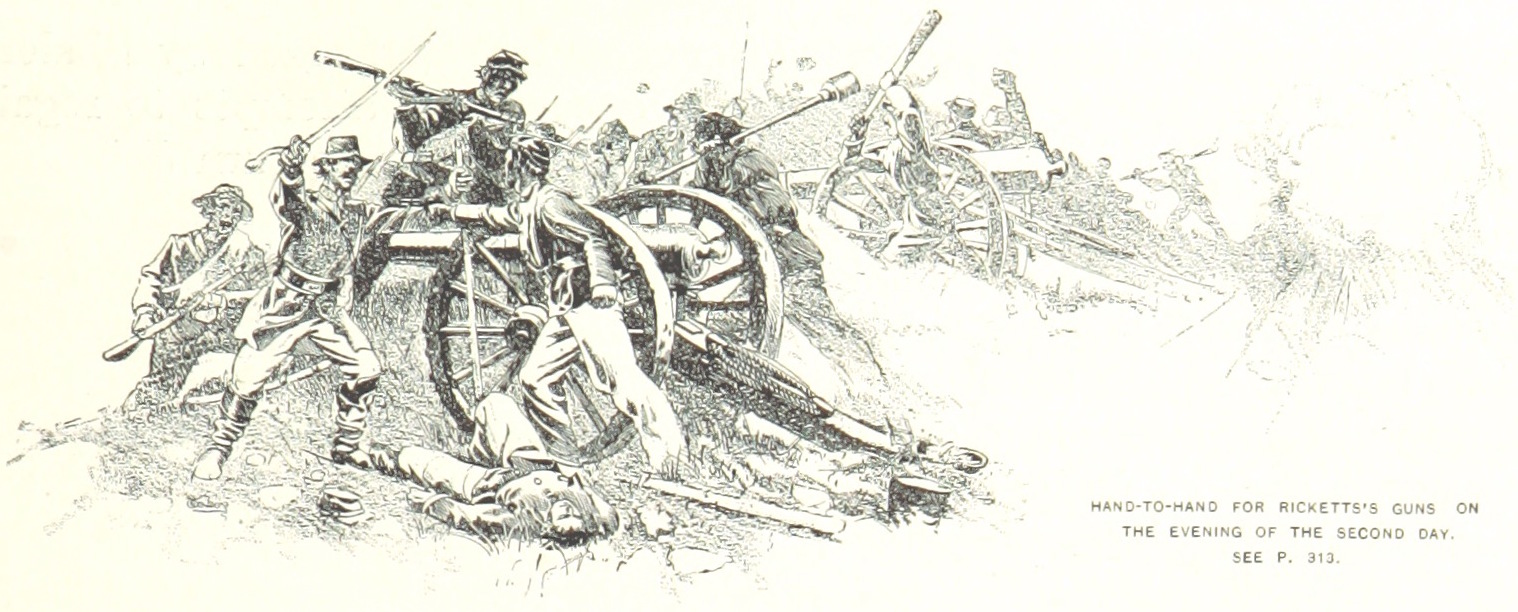
Hand-to-hand for Ricketts's guns on the evening of the second day of the battle of Gettysburg, July 2, 1863

The closing days of June 1863 found Major Tate and the 6th Regiment at York, Pennsylvania, and then hurrying back to Gettysburg they pressed the enemy so closely that the 6th Regiment crossed bayonets with them. The next day, June 2, was a significant occasion in the career of Colonel Tate. Late in the afternoon the 6th North Carolina, being then under his command, drove the enemy from East Cemetery Hill and possessed themselves of it. Eye-witnesses concurred in stating that the 6th North Carolina Regiment, gallantly led by him, engaged in a hand-to-hand encounter with the enemy intrenched behind the wall on the heights, where men were killed not only by bayonets and pistol shots, but by being clubbed by muskets and the ramrods of the artillerists. Tate wrote afterward:

75 North Carolinians of the Sixth Regiment and 12 Louisianians of Hays's brigade scaled the walls and planted the colors of the Sixth North Carolina and Ninth Louisiana on the guns. It was now fully dark. The enemy stood with tenacity never before displayed by them, but with bayonet, clubbed musket, sword, pistol, and rocks from the wall, we cleared the heights and silenced the guns.

— Major Samuel Tate, Official report

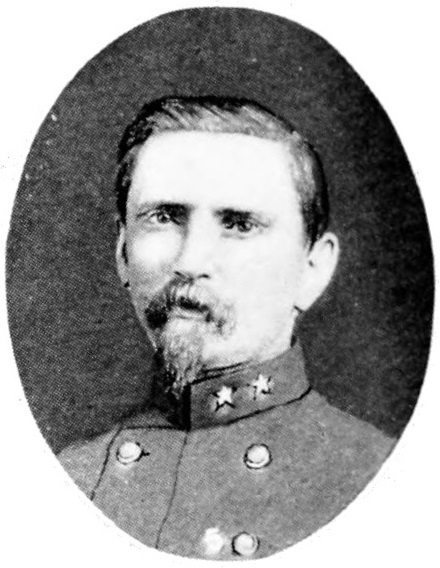
Tate wearing the uniform of a lieutenant colonel, 1863–65

It was on that field that Colonel Avery fell. Unable to speak from his mortal wound and with his right hand useless from the paralysis, Avery with his left hand scribbled a simple note and gave it to Tate. It said: "Major, tell my father I died with my face to the enemy. I. E. Avery." Major Tate then became lieutenant-colonel of the regiment.

=== Later engagements, 1863–65 ===
On November 7, 1863, at Rappahannock Bridge, Colonel Tate was wounded and ordered to the rear, and at the end of the famous Valley Campaign he was very severely wounded on the October 19, 1864, at the battle of Cedar Creek. The 6th Regiment shortly afterward reached the trenches in front of Petersburg, where Colonel Tate experienced the siege.

In the night attack on Fort Steadman, before daybreak on the morning of March 25, 1865, Colonel Tate was in command of his regiment, which along with the 57th attacked Fort Steadman, and he rendered gallant and valiant service in that assault. On that occasion he was again severely wounded and was sent home, where he suffered greatly. When Stoneman's raiders in April, after Lee's surrender, burst through the mountains and approached the Catawba, Colonel Tate, still suffering, joined with others in checking their advance.

== Later life ==
=== Railroads ===
Shortly after the close of the war, the stockholders of the Western North Carolina Railroad selected Tate for president of their disorganized, bankrupt, and war-wasted corporation. He repaired the roadbed and rebuilt bridges, revamped old rolling stock and put it to work; solicited business and inspired the people by his own energy; he haggled over prices and saved with judicious care, so that he righted his employers' affairs and enhanced their property.

This done, Provisional Governor Holden very promptly turned him out of office, and when Holden in turn went out, with Worth came back Tate, who, identified with the great work from its infancy, continued with it in one capacity or another almost uninterruptedly to the time when it passed forever from the control of North Carolina to that of Northern capitalists.

Throughout the early history of that corporation, whose railway became an important a link in interstate commerce, Colonel Tate labored and strove for its completion.

He early in the Reconstruction legislation advised his stockholders to consent to a division of the road and the creation of a new corporation, the Western Division of the Western North Carolina Railroad, which was turned over to the late George W. Swepson and his associates, with the hope and expectation that the work on the Eastern Division could be pressed forward the more effectively under that arrangement.

With the Eastern Division, from Salisbury to the French Broad River, Tate continued through that era as the financial agent of the stockholders and trustee for the payment of debts already contracted, having surrendered his presidency to the appointee of the Holden Board of 1868.

The loss of the State's credit in the Northern markets caused a comparatively trifling loan to assume the proportions of a threatening mortgage. For this he was berated by a portion of the State press, and he was aspersed by some commentators; but through it all Colonel Tate passed unscathed, and confidence in his integrity was not shaken among the people of his State.

=== Politics ===
Never in any strict sense of the term a politician, he was sent to the Legislature of 1874 from his native county by a majority of 400 in excess of any vote theretofore polled by his party. He drafted and had passed laws by which the Western Road was saved to the State and its construction reattempted; he put in familiar and popular use the lease and working of the State's convict force upon her works of internal improvements, this same Western Road being the chiefest of the beneficiaries. He labored untiringly and with great success as chairman of the Finance Committee to provide ways and means for the enlargement of leading charities and the establishment of new ones; he carried to completion the legislation which founded and sustained through trying years the Hospital for the Insane at his own home in Morganton. In 1880, 1882 and 1884 he again sat for Burke in the Lower House of the Legislature.

Closely associated with Colonel William L. Saunders, a mentor of the Democratic Party, allied with Colonel Hamilton C. Jones and other Confederate veterans of the Civil War, and supported by the State press, Colonel Tate was an important factor in public matters of import during the period of his career.

In 1886, there being a Democratic President, Controller of the Currency Trenholm tendered Colonel Tate, without solicitation on his part, the position of examiner of National Banks in the district stretching from West Virginia to and inclusive of Florida. Save the position of census-taker for his native county in 1850 and of postmaster at Morganton during the Buchanan administration, this was the only Federal position ever held by him.

On the death of treasurer Donald Bain in 1893, Governor Holt, who was his life-long friend, appointed Colonel Tate State treasurer. He was nominated in 1894 to succeed himself, but he was defeated in the Populist upheaval of that year, along with all the leaders of his party.

== Death ==
He never afterwards held office, but devoted his declining years to the welfare of his family and friends and in rendering such public service as was interesting to his community. He derived much satisfaction from his success in securing the location of the Deaf and Dumb School at Morganton.

He died suddenly at his home on June 25, 1897, just as he was about to entertain Judge Robinson, then holding court in Morganton, and some members of the bar who were invited to take tea with him. His funeral the Sunday following was by far the largest ever known in the county, all the countryside attending with many from a great distance. He rests in the town cemetery, which was purchased through his agency.

== Personal life ==
Colonel Tate married in October, 1866, Miss Jennie Pearson, daughter of Robert C. Pearson of Morganton, by whom he became the father of a large family of children, and who survived him but a few years. Both were members of the Presbyterian Communion.

== See also ==
- Tate House
- Joseph McDowell Jr.

== Sources ==
- Pfanz, Harry W. (1993). Gettysburg: Culp's Hill and Cemetery Hill. Chapel Hill, NC: University of North Carolina Press. pp. 258–259. ISBN 0-8078-2118-7.
- "History of North Carolina Treasurers". North Carolina Department of State Treasurer. Accessed 20 May 2023.

Attribution:

- Pearson, W. S. (1905). "Samuel McDow Tate". In Ashe, Samuel A. (ed.). Biographical History of North Carolina. Vol. 4. Greensboro, NC: Charles L. Van Noppen. pp. 430–439.

Party political offices
Preceded by Donald W. Bain	Democratic nominee for North Carolina State Treasurer; 1892	Succeeded by Benjamin F. Aycock
