= Bill Cline =

American gridiron football player (born 1943)

No. 27, 14
- Positions: Quarterback, defensive back, punter

Personal information
- Born: September 2, 1943 (age 83); Valdese, North Carolina, U.S.
- Listed height: 6 ft 0 in (1.83 m)
- Listed weight: 190 lb (86 kg)

Career information
- High school: Valdese (NC)
- College: East Carolina (1961–1964)

Career history
- 1965–1967: Ottawa Rough Riders
- 1968: Saskatchewan Roughriders

William Jerome Cline (born September 2, 1943) is an American former professional football quarterback and defensive back who played for the Ottawa Rough Riders and Saskatchewan Roughriders of the Canadian Football League (CFL). He played college football for East Carolina.

== Early life ==
Cline was born on September 2, 1943, in Valdese, North Carolina and attended and played football for Valdese High School. As a senior in 1960, he was named team MVP while also being selected to the Northwestern 3A All-Conference Team, North Carolina All-State Team, and he was also selected North Carolina Shrine Bowl Team.

== College career ==
Cline played college football for East Carolina. While with the Pirates he gained a total of 3,383 yards which was an East Carolina record for 25 years. He threw for 2,425 yards and 27 touchdowns while also returning punts for the team. In 1964 he led the Pirates to a win in the 1964 Tangerine Bowl and was also named the game's MVP.

== Professional career ==
=== Ottawa Rough Riders ===
In 1965, Cline signed with the Ottawa Rough Riders of the Canadian Football League (CFL). With the team he was mainly used as the punter. He also played defensive back and quarterback sparingly for the team.

Cline was once again used as a punter in 1966, while also playing his other positions on offense and defense. As a member of the Rough Riders in 1966 he was a part of the league runner-ups as they lost the 1966 Grey Cup.

In 1967, Cline played his final year with the Rough Riders as he continued to be a punter, defensive back, and quarterback.

=== Saskatchewan Roughriders ===
In 1968, Cline signed with the Saskatchewan Roughriders. During the season he was used mainly as a defensive back with a diminished role, only catching two interceptions for seventeen yards in five games.

== Honors ==
Cline is a member of the East Carolina University Athletics Hall of Fame and the Burke County Sports Hall of Fame.
