= From This Day Forward (play) =

- Written by: Fred Cranford
- Genre: Outdoor historical drama

Premiere
- Date premiered: 1968
- Place premiered: Valdese, North Carolina

From This Day Forward is an outdoor historical drama during summers in the Fred B. Cranford Amphitheatre on Church Street in Valdese, North Carolina. The play was written by Cranford and is performed annually as the flagship show of Old Colony Players.

The play recounts the story of a group of French-Italian Protestants called Waldenses who came to America in 1893 and founded the community of Valdese after suffering religious persecution in Europe. Waldenses were persecuted by both the Catholic Church and reigning monarchs like Louis XIV who labeled them as heretics and sought to destroy them. The play starts in 1686 and covers 200 years of history.

== History ==
The show premiered in 1968 in a custom-built amphitheater as part of the town's 75th anniversary celebration. The show runs from mid-July through mid-August.

The stage revolves to reveal interior scenes. The amphitheater grounds have become a preservation site for the Waldensian culture. In 1972, Tron House, the first house built when the Waldenses came to Valdese, was moved to the theatre grounds and restored for visitors. A saw mill engine Waldenses used to build their homes is also on display at the theatre. The amphitheater was renamed from the "Old Colony Amphitheatre" in honor of the playwright. A Bocce court was also added to the grounds.
