= Dr. Joseph Bennett Riddle House =

Historic house in North Carolina, United States

- U.S. National Register of Historic Places
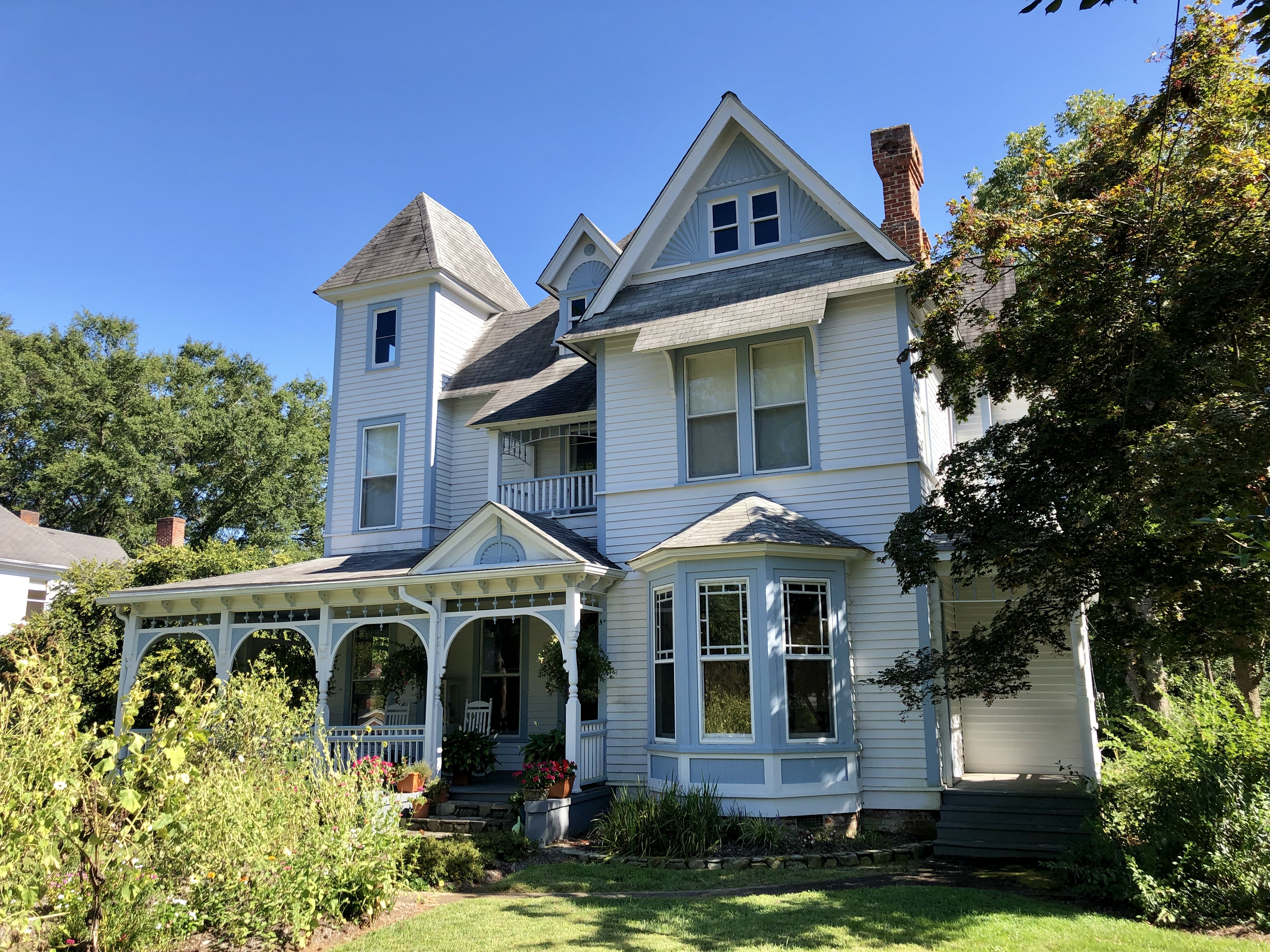
- Dr. Joseph Bennett Riddle House, August 2019

- Location within North Carolina Location within the United States
- Location: 411 W. Union St., Morganton, North Carolina
- Coordinates: 35°44′24″N 81°41′37″W
- Area: 0.8 acres (0.32 ha)
- Built: c. 1892
- Architectural style: Queen Anne
- NRHP reference No.: 84000524
- Added to NRHP: December 20, 1984

Dr. Joseph Bennett Riddle House is a historic home located at Morganton, Burke County, North Carolina. It was built about 1892, and is a 2 1/2-story, five-bay, Queen Anne style frame house. It features a number of balconies, bay windows, and dormers. A three-story tower was added in about 1910.

It was listed on the National Register of Historic Places in 1984.
