= U. S. B. Dale's Market =

Historic building in North Carolina, US

- Dale's, USB Market
- U.S. National Register of Historic Places
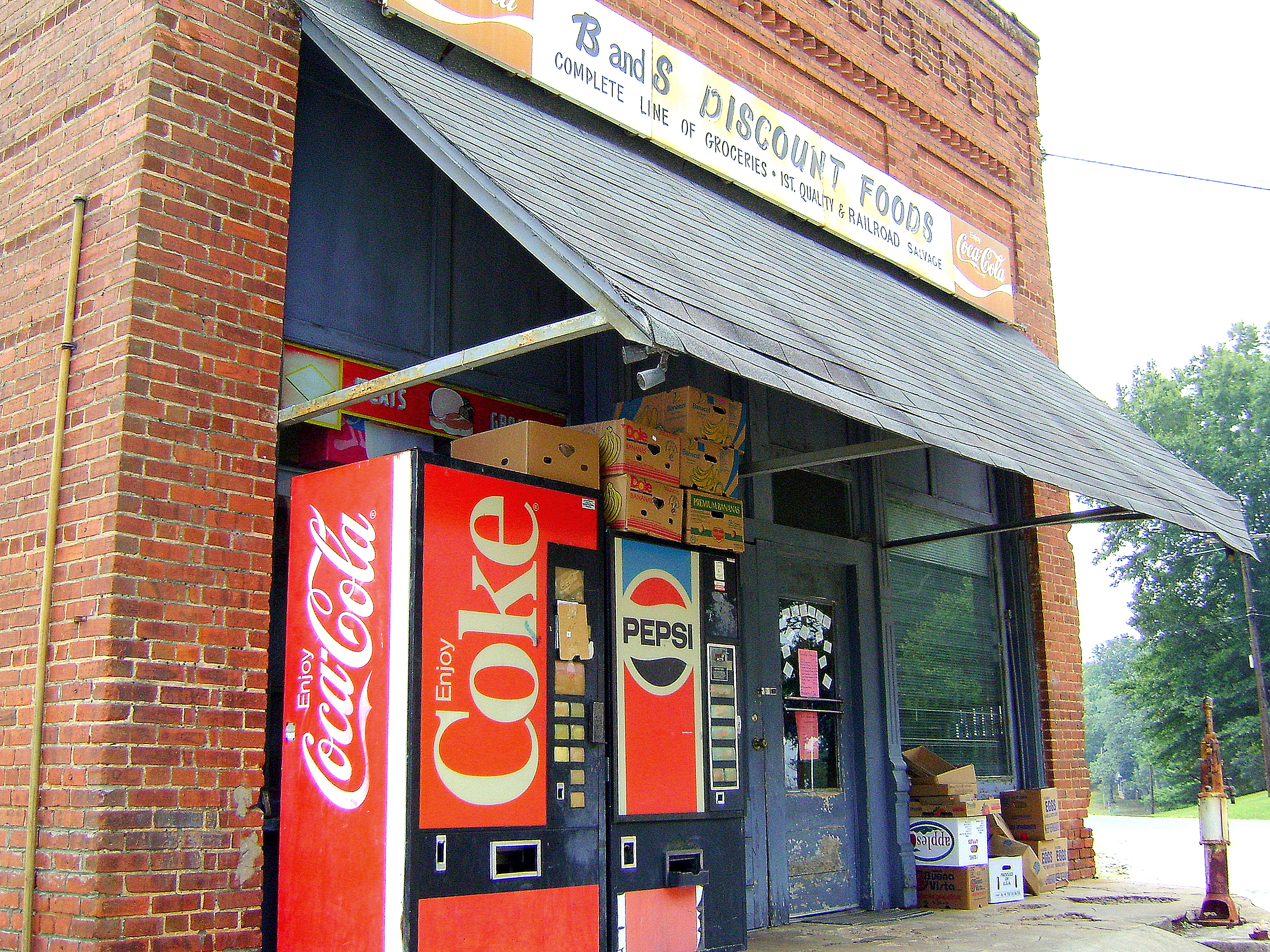
- U. S. B. Dale's Market, September 2011

- Location within North Carolina Location within the United States
- Location: Jct. of Enola Rd. & Dale St., Morganton, North Carolina
- Coordinates: 35°43′33″N 81°40′20″W
- Area: 0.2 acres (0.081 ha)
- Built: c. 1900
- MPS: Morganton MRA
- NRHP reference No.: 87001924
- Added to NRHP: November 9, 1987

U. S. B. Dale's Market, also known as B & S Discount Foods, is a historic commercial building located near Morganton, Burke County, North Carolina. It was built about 1900 as a neighborhood grocery store for the Grant Dale community. It is a one-story, rectangular, flat-roofed, brick building with a stepped parapet. It is a rare intact example of a rural community store.

It was listed on the National Register of Historic Places in 1987.
