= Jean-Pierre Auguste Dalmas House =

Historic house in North Carolina, United States

- U.S. National Register of Historic Places
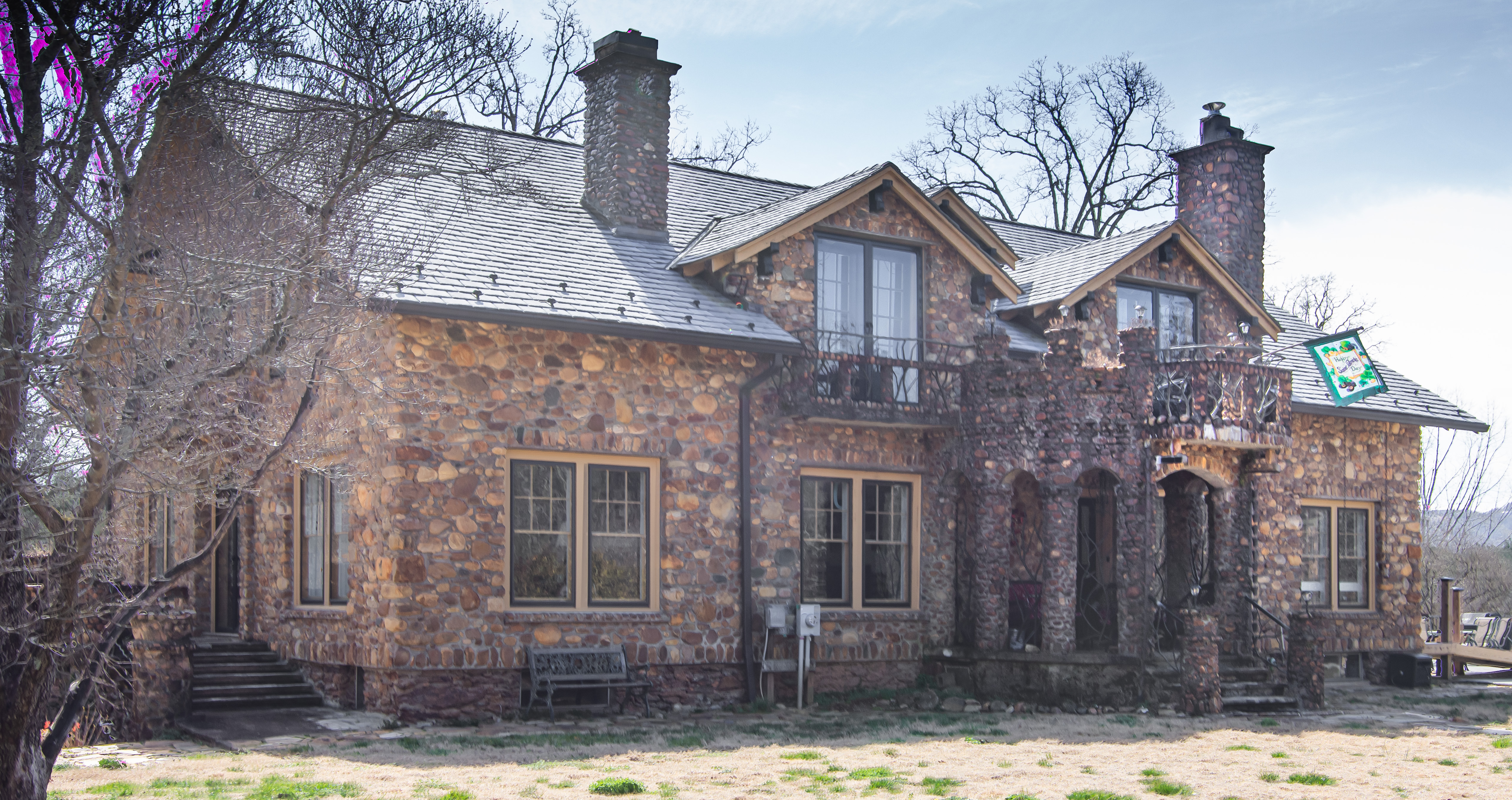

- Location within North Carolina Location within the United States
- Location: 4950 Villar Lane, NE, Valdese, North Carolina
- Coordinates: 35°45′28″N 81°33′50″W
- Area: 26 acres (11 ha)
- Built: 1929
- Built by: Dalmas, Jean-Pierre Auguste
- Architectural style: Waldensian
- NRHP reference No.: 02000444
- Added to NRHP: May 2, 2002

Jean-Pierre Auguste Dalmas House is a historic home located in Valdese, Burke County, North Carolina. It was built between 1929 and 1948, and is a 3-story, banked frame dwelling with a river rock and fieldstone foundation and veneer. It was constructed by a Waldensian immigrant from Northern Italy, Jean-Pierre Dalmas (1878-1972).

It was listed on the National Register of Historic Places in 2002.
