= Franklin Pierce Tate House =

Historic house in North Carolina, United States

- U.S. National Register of Historic Places
- U.S. Historic district – Contributing property
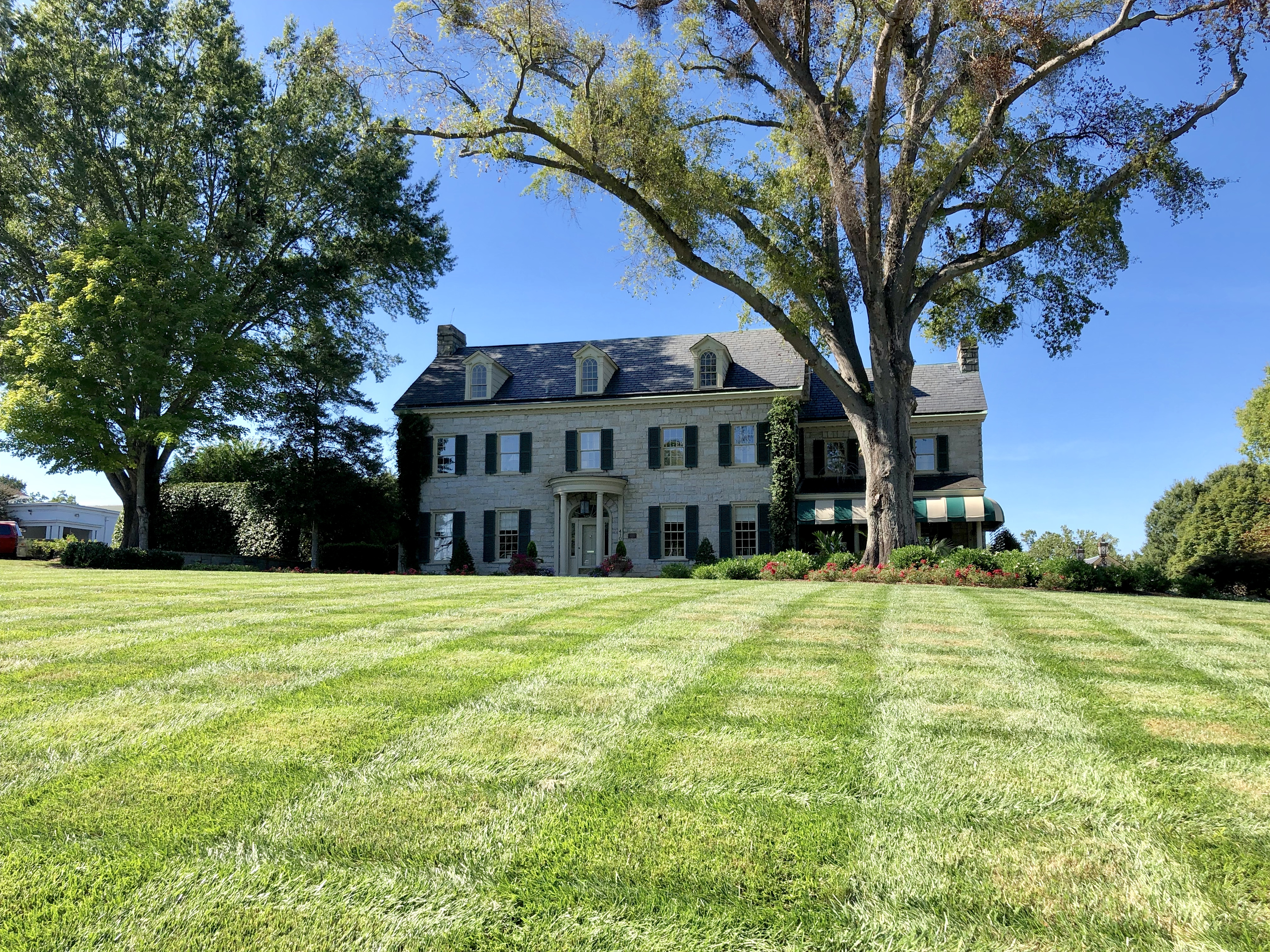
- Franklin Pierce Tate House, August 2019

- Location within North Carolina Location within the United States
- Location: 410 W. Union St., Morganton, North Carolina
- Coordinates: 35°44′26″N 81°41′41″W
- Area: 2.9 acres (1.2 ha)
- Built: 1928
- Architect: Litchfield, Electus D.
- Architectural style: Colonial Revival
- MPS: Morganton MRA
- NRHP reference No.: 86001171
- Added to NRHP: May 21, 1986

Franklin Pierce Tate House is a historic home located at Morganton, Burke County, North Carolina. It was designed by architect Electus D. Litchfield and completed in 1928. It is a two-story, Colonial Revival style dwelling constructed of irregularly-coursed, rock-faced granite blocks.

It consists of a main block measuring 52 feet by 33 feet, with a recessed two-story wing. The front entrance features a semi-circular, flat-roofed portico. It was built by Franklin Pierce Tate (1867–1937), a prominent Morganton banker and mill-owner, and son of Colonel Samuel McDowell Tate who built the Tate House. Colonel Tate, who served several terms in the state legislature, was a major reason why Broughton Hospital and the North Carolina School for the Deaf were chosen to be built in Morganton.

It was listed on the National Register of Historic Places in 1986. It is located in the West Union Street Historic District.
