= South King Street Historic District =

Historic district in North Carolina, United States

- U.S. National Register of Historic Places
- U.S. Historic district
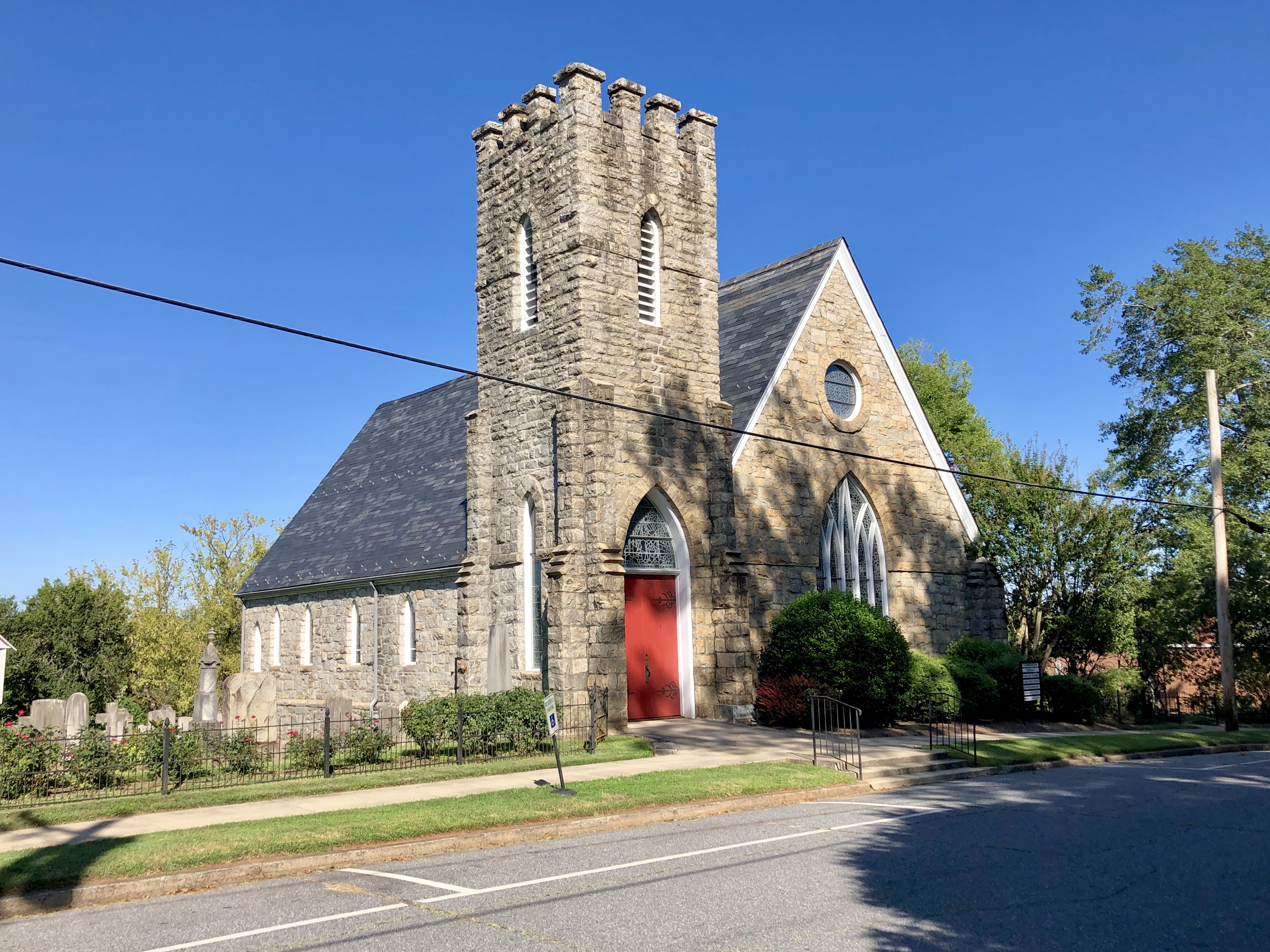
- Grace Episcopal Church, a contributing structure

- Location within North Carolina Location within the United States
- Location: S. King St., Morganton, North Carolina
- Coordinates: 35°44′34″N 81°41′12″W
- Area: 5.5 acres (2.2 ha)
- Built: c. 1890
- Architect: Marsh, M.R.; Et al.
- Architectural style: Colonial Revival, Late Gothic Revival, Georgian Revival
- MPS: Morganton MRA
- NRHP reference No.: 87001920
- Added to NRHP: November 9, 1987

South King Street Historic District is a national historic district located at Morganton, Burke County, North Carolina. It encompasses 10 contributing buildings in Morganton. The district contains residential, religious, and educational buildings built between about 1893 and 1939. It includes district includes representative examples of Colonial Revival, Georgian Revival, and Gothic Revival style architecture. Notable buildings include the Grace Episcopal Church (c. 1893), Morganton Library (c. 1935), and Works Progress Administration constructed nurses' home.

It was listed on the National Register of Historic Places in 1987.
