= Franklin-Penland House =

Historic house in North Carolina, United States

- U.S. National Register of Historic Places
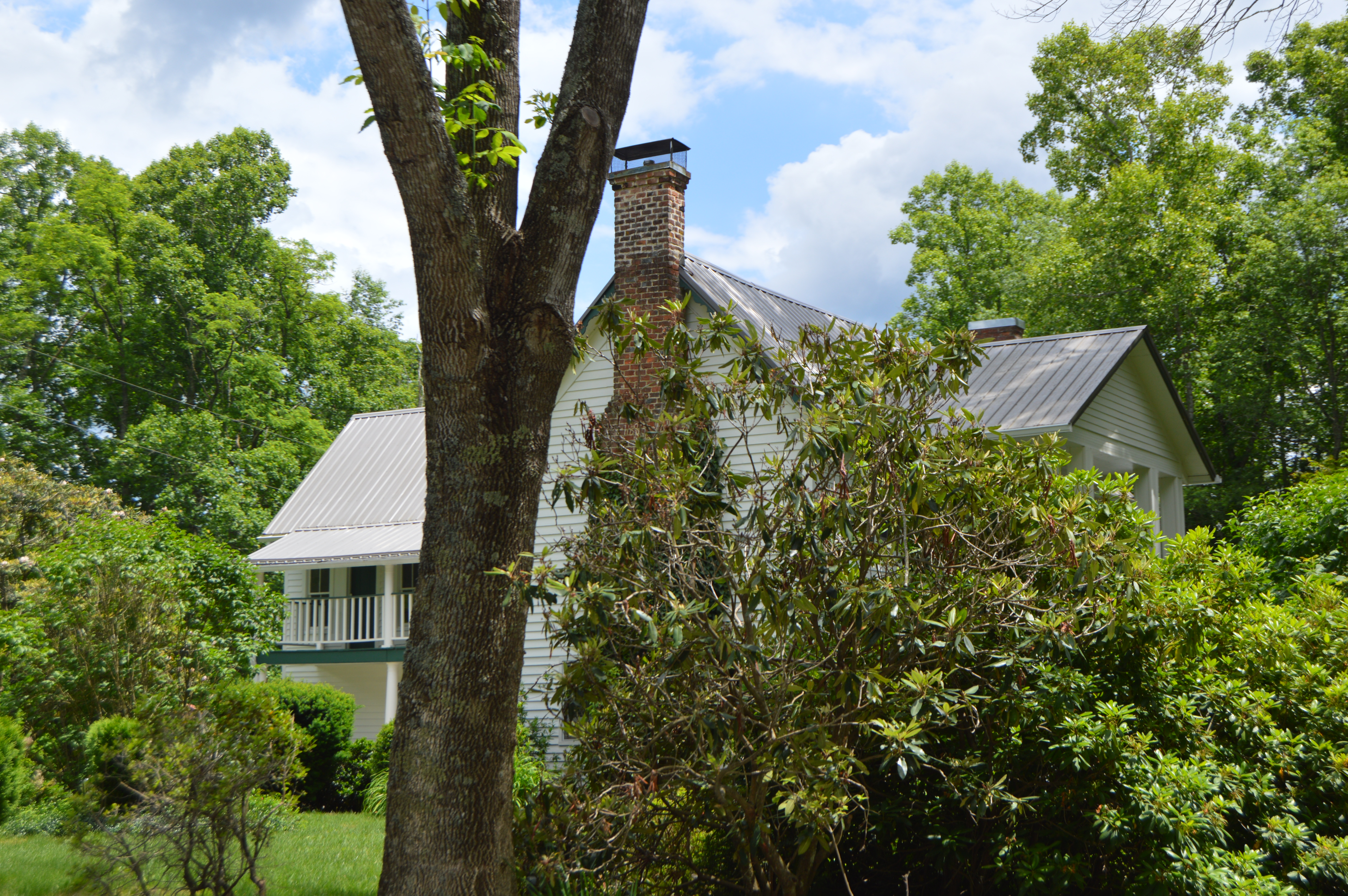
- Northern side and front

- Location within North Carolina Location within the United States
- Location: 8646 NC 183, Linville Falls, North Carolina
- Coordinates: 35°57′11″N 81°56′12″W
- Area: 2.8 acres (1.1 ha)
- Built: c. 1883
- Built by: William MacLamore
- Architectural style: I-house
- NRHP reference No.: 06001106
- Added to NRHP: November 28, 2006

Franklin-Penland House, also known as Theodore C. Franklin House, Stokes Penland House, and Linville Falls Post Office, is a historic home located at Linville Falls, Burke County, North Carolina. It was built about 1883, and is a two-story, three-bay, frame I-house with a two-story rear ell. It features a full-width, attached two-tiered shed roof porch added about 1915. Also on the property is the former U.S. Post Office, Linville Falls, N.C., building. The one-room front gable frame building was built in 1907 and housed the Linville Falls post office until 1925.

It was listed on the National Register of Historic Places in 2006.
