= Valdese News =

Newspaper based in Valdese, North Carolina, United States

- Type: Newspaper
- Owner: Valdese News Pub Company
- Founded: 1938
- Ceased publication: 1950
- Language: English
- OCLC number: 21769169

The Valdese News was a newspaper based in Valdese, North Carolina covering Burke County. The newspaper was published from 1938 through 1950.
