= Gilboa Methodist Church =

Historic church in North Carolina, United States

- U.S. National Register of Historic Places
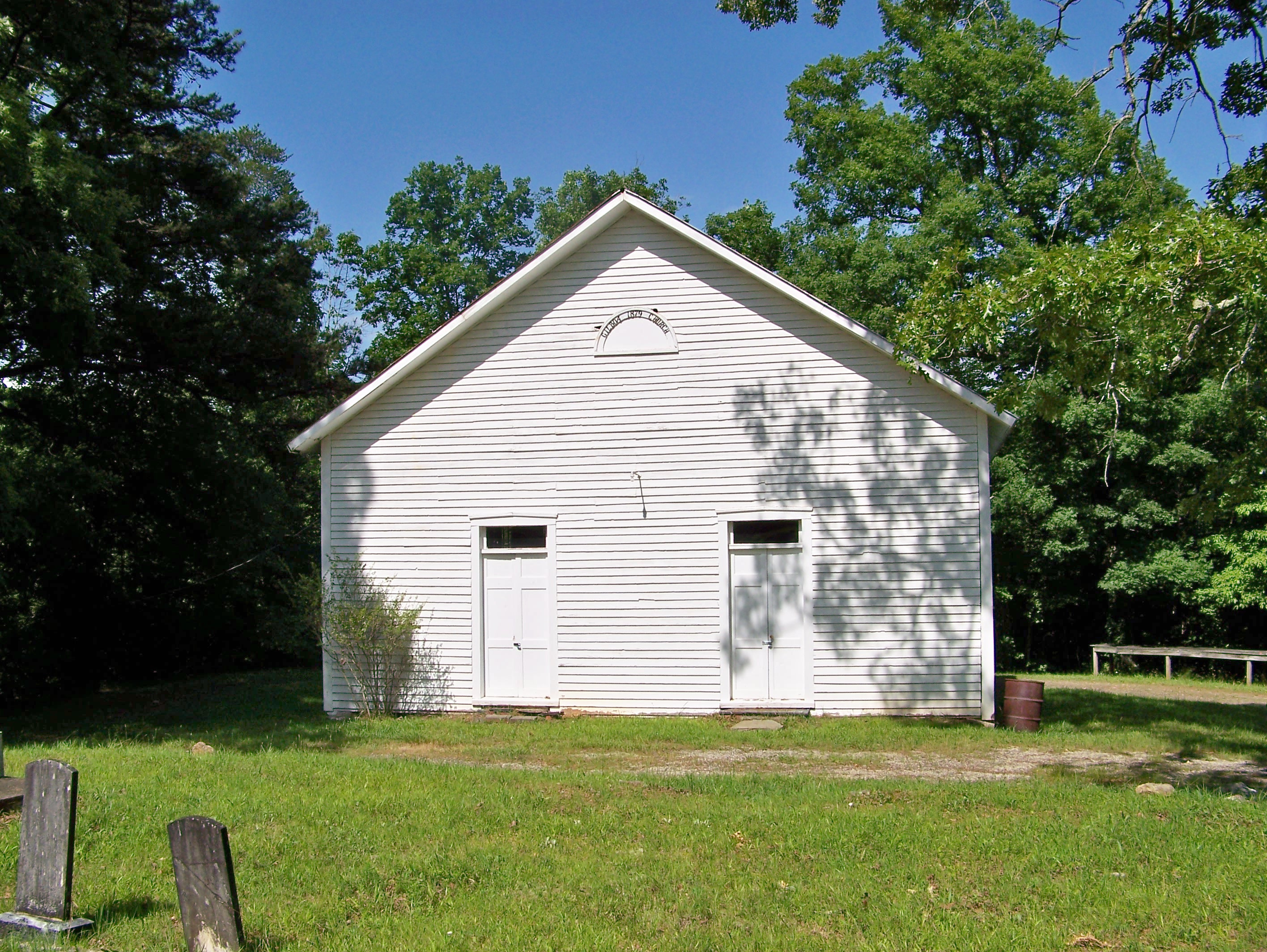

- Location within North Carolina Location within the United States
- Location: U.S. 64, near Salem, North Carolina
- Coordinates: 35°41′17″N 81°43′45″W
- Area: 0.5 acres (0.20 ha)
- Built: 1879
- NRHP reference No.: 84000075
- Added to NRHP: October 11, 1984

Gilboa Methodist Church is a historic Methodist church located near Salem, Burke County, North Carolina. It was built in 1879, and is a rectangular two bay by four bay, frame church building. It sits on a stone pier foundation and has a standing seam metal roof.

It was listed on the National Register of Historic Places in 1984.
