= Salem, North Carolina =

- Census-designated place
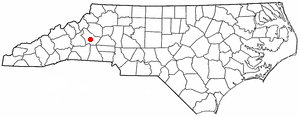
- Location of Salem, North Carolina
- Coordinates: 35°41′59″N 81°42′01″W
- Country: United States
- State: North Carolina
- County: Burke

Area
  - Total: 4.29 sq mi (11.12 km^{2})
  - Land: 4.29 sq mi (11.12 km^{2})
  - Water: 0 sq mi (0.00 km^{2})
- Elevation: 1,221 ft (372 m)

Population (2020)
  - Total: 2,356
  - Density: 548.8/sq mi (211.89/km^{2})
- Time zone: UTC-5 (Eastern (EST))
  - Summer (DST): UTC-4 (EDT)
- ZIP code: 28655
- Area code: 828
- FIPS code: 37-58740
- GNIS feature ID: 2402818

Salem is a census-designated place (CDP) in Burke County, North Carolina, United States. As of the 2020 census, Salem had a population of 2,356. It is part of the Hickory–Lenoir–Morganton Metropolitan Statistical Area.

== History ==
Gilboa Methodist Church was listed on the National Register of Historic Places in 1984.

== Geography ==
Salem is located in central Burke County. It is bordered to the north by the city of Morganton, the county seat.

U.S. Route 64 (Burkemont Avenue) is the main road through the community, leading north into Morganton and southwest 29 miles (47 km) to Rutherfordton. Interstate 40 passes along the northern edge of the CDP, with access from Exit 103 (US-64).

According to the United States Census Bureau, the CDP has a total area of 4.3 square miles (11.1 km^{2}), all land.

== Demographics ==
Historical population
Census	Pop.	Note	%±
2020	2,356		—
U.S. Decennial Census

=== 2020 census ===
As of the 2020 census, Salem had a population of 2,356. The median age was 46.1 years. 20.5% of residents were under the age of 18 and 23.8% of residents were 65 years of age or older. For every 100 females there were 92.3 males, and for every 100 females age 18 and over there were 88.9 males age 18 and over.

89.9% of residents lived in urban areas, while 10.1% lived in rural areas.

There were 981 households in Salem, of which 23.4% had children under the age of 18 living in them. Of all households, 49.1% were married-couple households, 20.3% were households with a male householder and no spouse or partner present, and 24.5% were households with a female householder and no spouse or partner present. About 31.1% of all households were made up of individuals and 16.0% had someone living alone who was 65 years of age or older.

There were 1,045 housing units, of which 6.1% were vacant. The homeowner vacancy rate was 0.7% and the rental vacancy rate was 1.6%.

Salem racial composition
Race	Number	Percentage
White (non-Hispanic)	1,960	83.19%
Black or African American (non-Hispanic)	68	2.89%
Native American	7	0.3%
Asian	30	1.27%
Pacific Islander	5	0.21%
Other/Mixed	99	4.2%
Hispanic or Latino	187	7.94%

=== 2000 census ===
As of the census of 2000, there were 2,923 people, 918 households, and 678 families residing in the CDP. The population density was 692.3 inhabitants per square mile (267.3/km^{2}). There were 962 housing units at an average density of 227.9 per square mile (88.0/km^{2}). The racial makeup of the CDP was 78.86% White, 15.91% African American, 0.48% Native American, 1.81% Asian, 0.44% Pacific Islander, 1.27% from other races, and 1.23% from two or more races. Hispanic or Latino of any race were 2.19% of the population.

There were 918 households, out of which 29.5% had children under the age of 18 living with them, 56.6% were married couples living together, 11.0% had a female householder with no husband present, and 26.1% were non-families. 22.8% of all households were made up of individuals, and 8.0% had someone living alone who was 65 years of age or older. The average household size was 2.45 and the average family size was 2.82.

In the CDP the population was spread out, with 25.0% under the age of 18, 21.8% from 18 to 24, 21.2% from 25 to 44, 21.5% from 45 to 64, and 10.5% who were 65 years of age or older. The median age was 28 years. For every 100 females there were 153.1 males. For every 100 females age 18 and over, there were 147.5 males.

The median income for a household in the CDP was $32,050, and the median income for a family was $45,430. Males had a median income of $28,672 versus $21,913 for females. The per capita income for the CDP was $14,506. About 9.5% of families and 10.7% of the population were below the poverty line, including 11.6% of those under age 18 and 17.7% of those age 65 or over.

== Education ==
- Salem Elementary School
- Robert Logan Patton High School
- Liberty Middle School

== Notable people ==
- Herman S. Hoffman (1841–1912), Reformed Episcopalian bishop
- Sarah Huston (1848–1926), newspaper editor and publisher
