= Dunavant Cotton Manufacturing Company =

Historic cotton mill in Morganton, North Carolina, active 1888-1949

- U.S. National Register of Historic Places
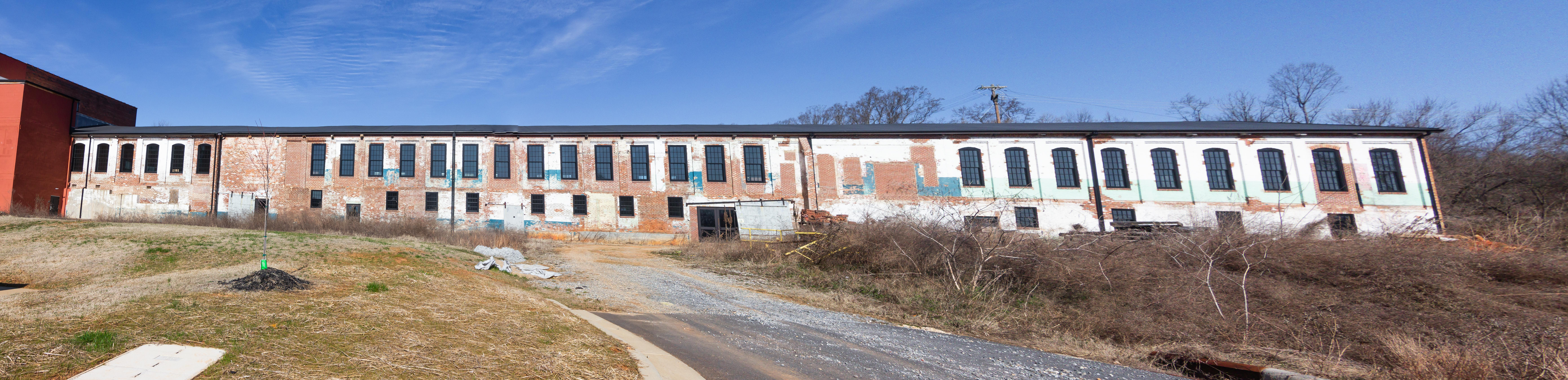

- Location within North Carolina Location within the United States
- Location: 109 E. Fleming Dr., Morganton, North Carolina
- Coordinates: 35°44′29″N 81°40′50″W
- Area: 8.321 acres (3.367 ha)
- Built: 1888, 1900, c. 1910, c. 1920, 1963, 1966
- NRHP reference No.: 13000227
- Added to NRHP: May 1, 2013

Dunavant Cotton Manufacturing Company, also known as Alpine Cotton Mill No. 1, is a historic cotton mill located at Morganton, Burke County, North Carolina. It is a two-story, brick-clad, side gable-roofed building. The original section was built in 1888–1910, with additions and expansions through 1966. The additions to the building, made in the mid to late 1960s were removed in 2012 to reveal the original 1888-1910 mill building. It is the oldest cotton textile mill in Morganton, and was in use as a cotton textile mill until 1949.

It was listed on the National Register of Historic Places in 2013.
