= Jacob Forney Jr. House =

Historic house in North Carolina, United States

- U.S. National Register of Historic Places
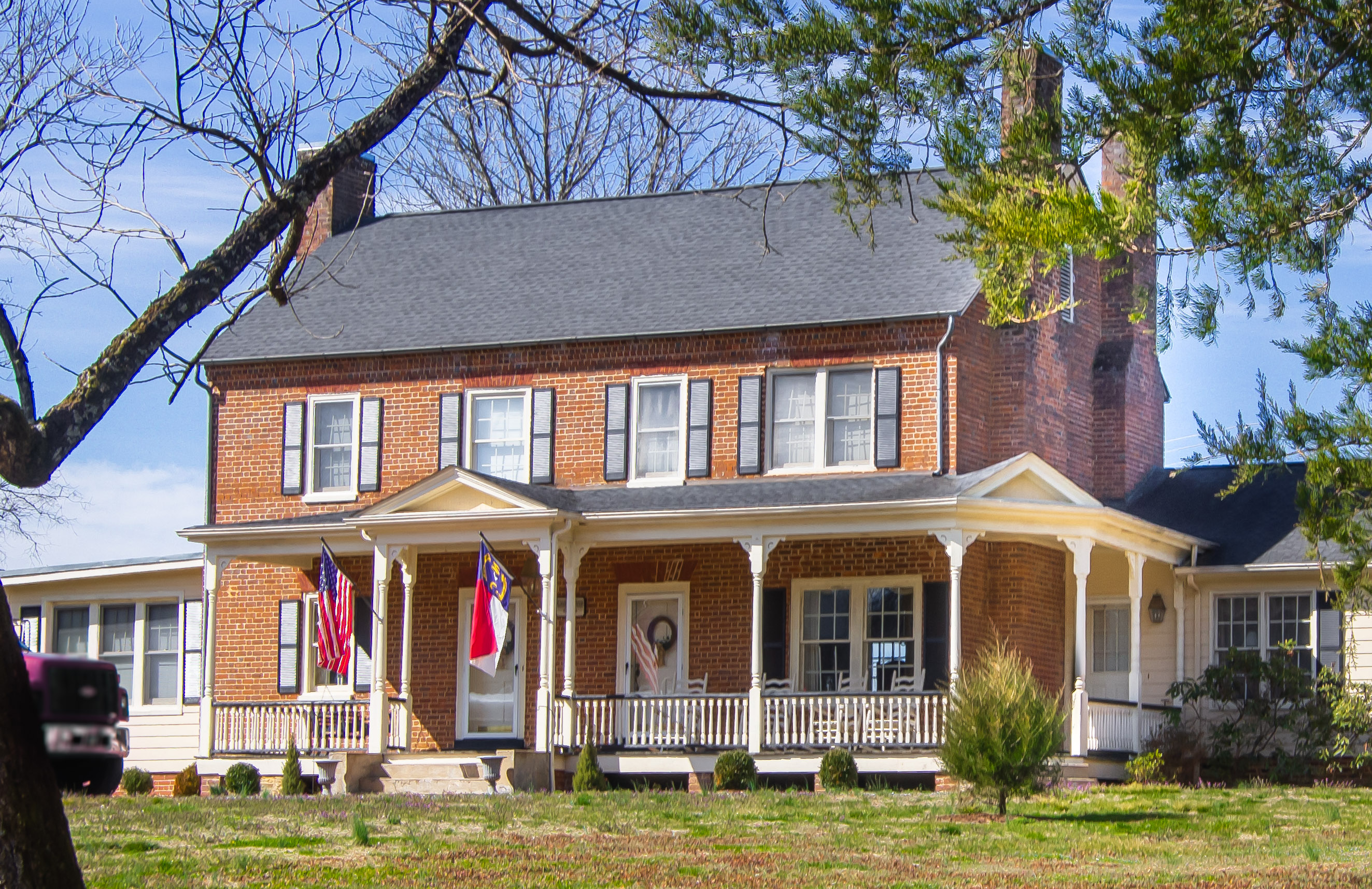

- Location within North Carolina Location within the United States
- Location: NW of Morganton on SR 1440, near Morganton, North Carolina
- Coordinates: 35°48′1″N 81°43′10″W
- Area: 9.9 acres (4.0 ha)
- Built: 1825-1826
- Architectural style: Federal
- NRHP reference No.: 76001309
- Added to NRHP: October 14, 1976

Jacob Forney Jr. House is a historic home located near Morganton, Burke County, North Carolina, United States. It was built in 1825–1826, and is a two-story, four-bay, Federal-style brick house. Its brickwork is laid in Flemish bond. It sits on a stone foundation.

It was listed on the National Register of Historic Places in 1976.
