= White Street–Valdese Avenue Historic District =

Historic district in North Carolina, United States

- U.S. National Register of Historic Places
- U.S. Historic district
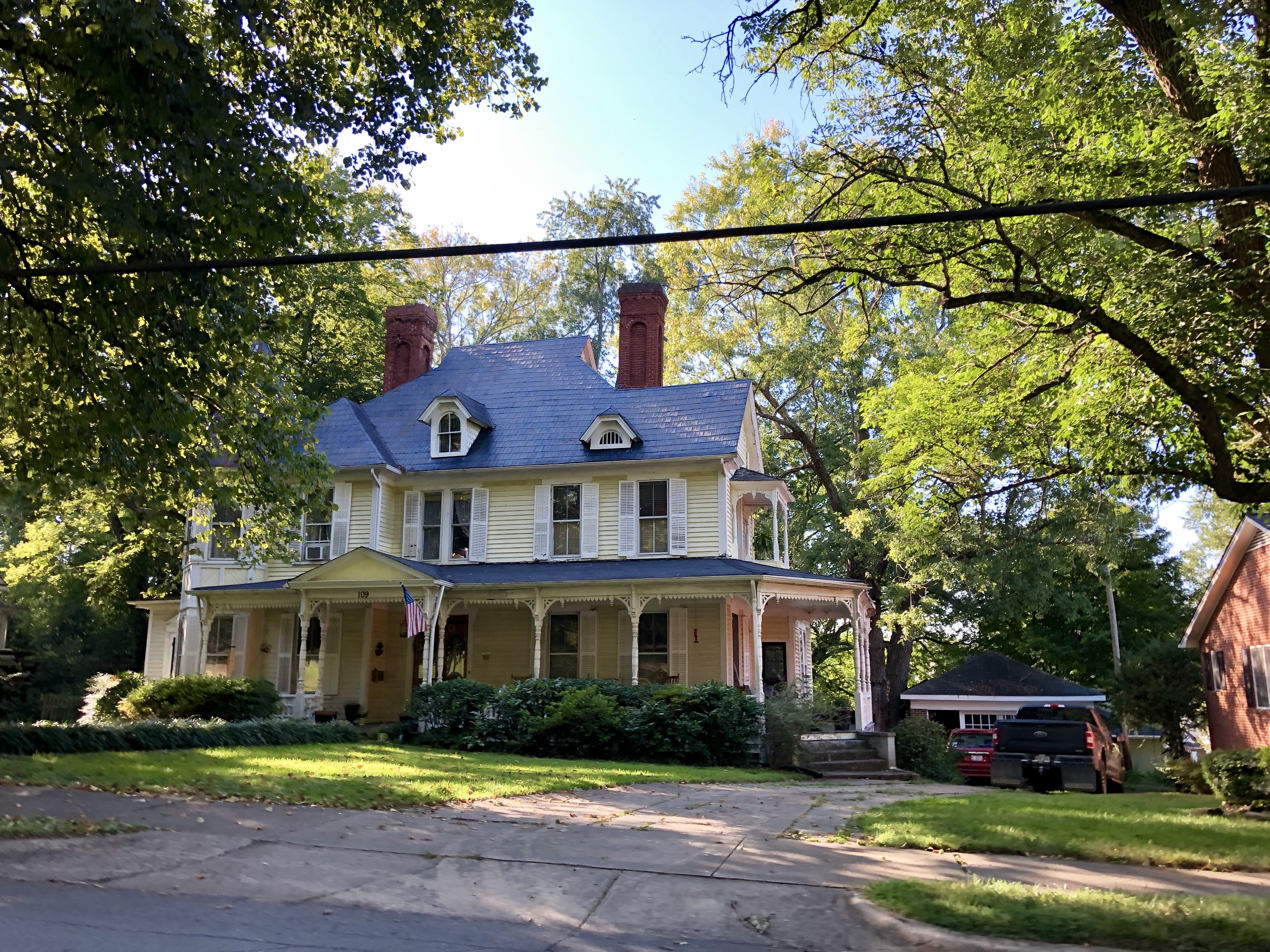
- A Contributing Structure on Valdese Avenue

- Location within North Carolina Location within the United States
- Location: White St. & Valdese Ave., Morganton, North Carolina
- Coordinates: 35°44′50″N 81°40′50″W
- Area: 22 acres (8.9 ha)
- Built: 1885
- Architectural style: Colonial Revival, Bungalow/craftsman, Late Victorian
- MPS: Morganton MRA
- NRHP reference No.: 87001927
- Added to NRHP: November 9, 1987

White Street–Valdese Avenue Historic District is a national historic district located at Morganton, Burke County, North Carolina. It encompasses 38 contributing buildings in a predominantly residential section of Morganton. They were built between about 1885 and 1936 and includes representative examples of Colonial Revival, Bungalow / American Craftsman, and Late Victorian style architecture.

It was listed on the National Register of Historic Places in 1987.
