= Avery Avenue Historic District =

Historic district in North Carolina, United States

- U.S. National Register of Historic Places
- U.S. Historic district
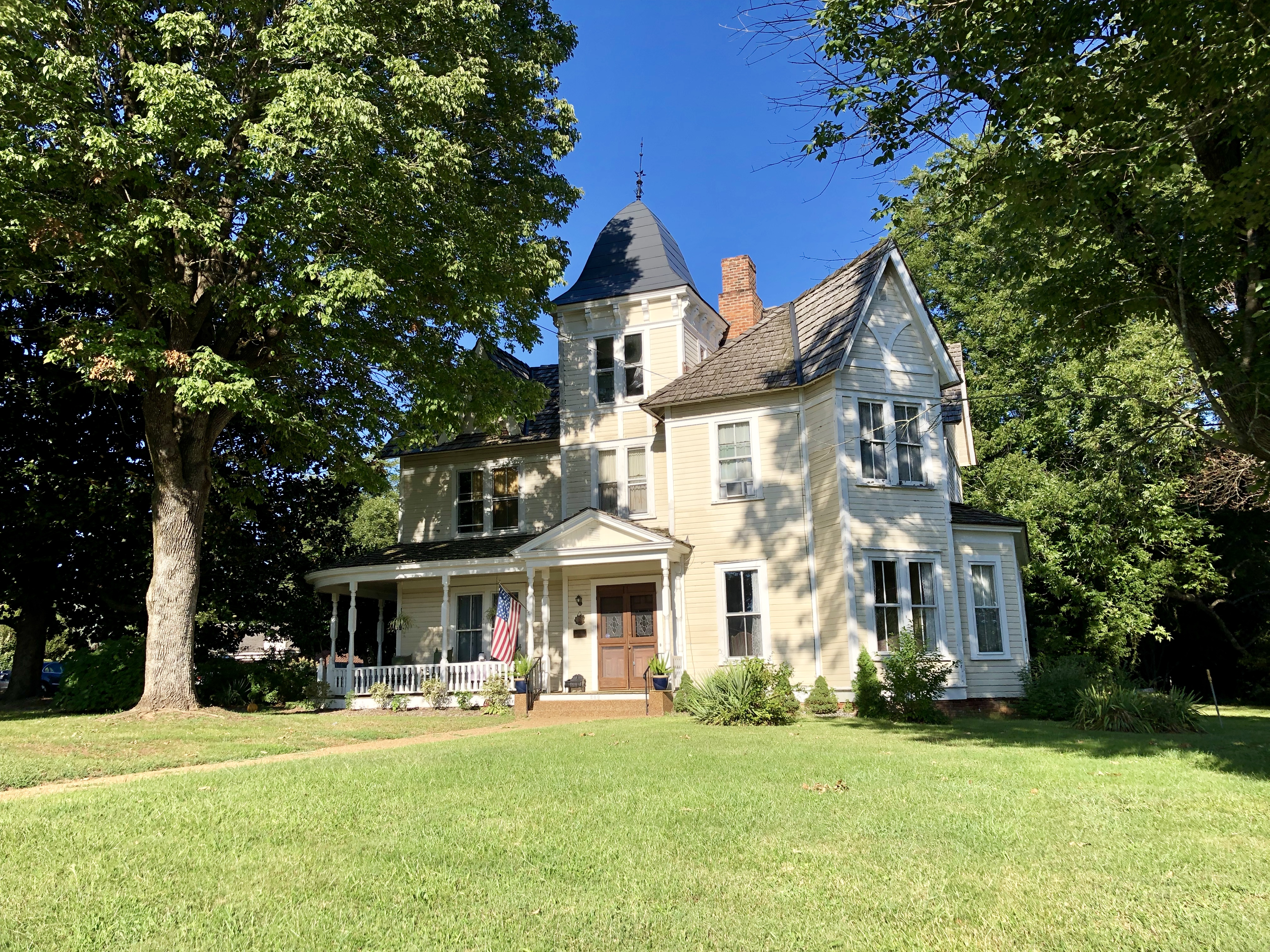
- Burleson House

- Location within North Carolina Location within the United States
- Location: Roughly along parts of Avery, Lenoir, Morehead, Walker, Evans, & Short Sts., Morganton, North Carolina
- Coordinates: 35°45′11″N 81°41′18″W
- Area: 43 acres (17 ha)
- Built: 1875
- Architectural style: Colonial Revival, Bungalow/craftsman, Late Victorian
- MPS: Morganton MRA
- NRHP reference No.: 87001915
- Added to NRHP: November 9, 1987

Avery Avenue Historic District is a national historic district located at Morganton, Burke County, North Carolina. It encompasses 112 contributing buildings in a predominantly residential section of Morganton. They were built between about 1875 and 1935, and include representative examples of Colonial Revival, Bungalow / American Craftsman, and Late Victorian style architecture.

It was listed on the National Register of Historic Places in 1987.
