= Linville Falls, North Carolina =

- Unincorporated community
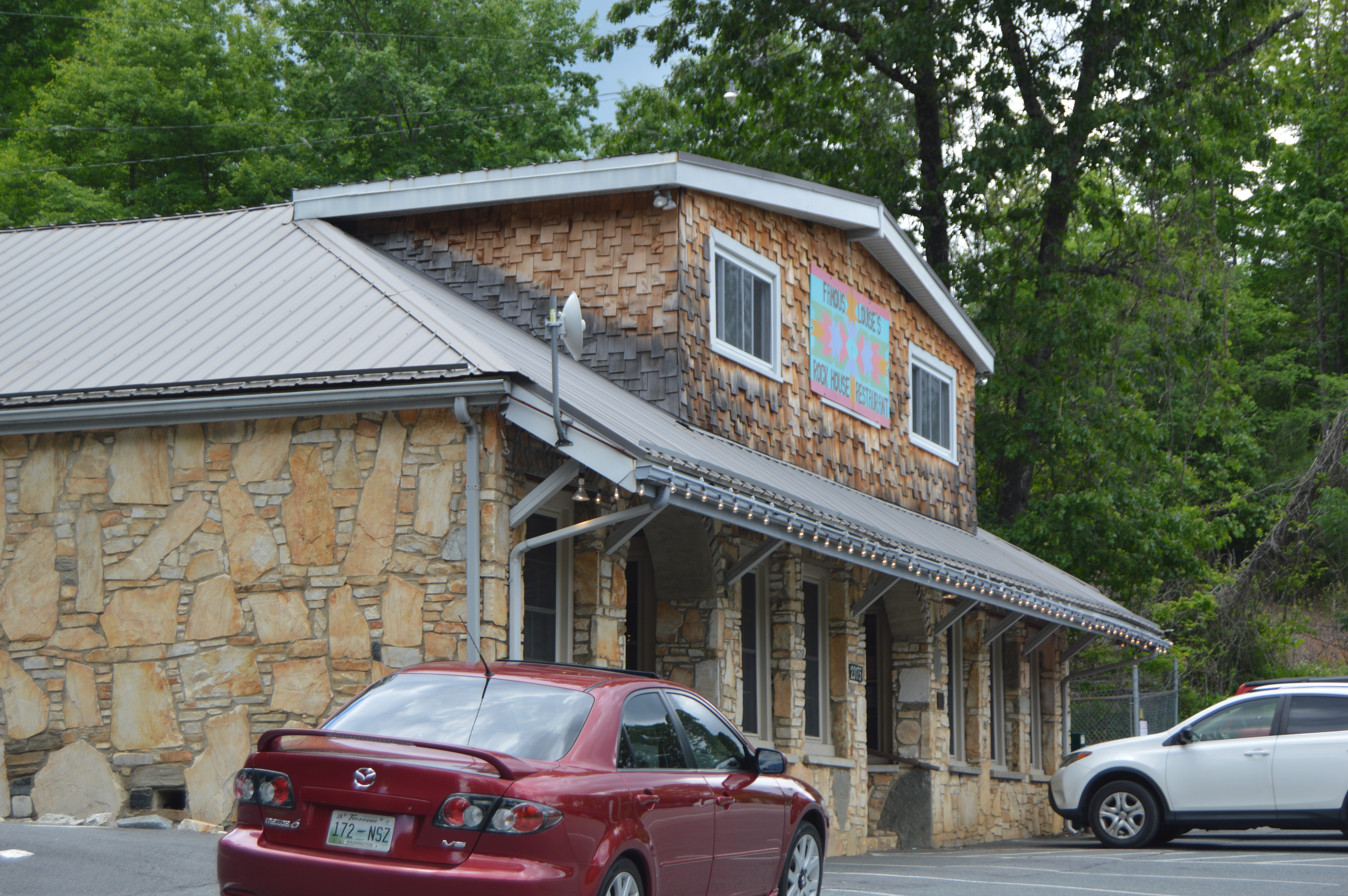
- Linville Falls Tavern

- Location within the state of North Carolina
- Coordinates: 35°59′27″N 81°56′39″W
- Country: United States
- State: North Carolina
- County: Avery, Burke, McDowell
- Named after: Linville Falls
- Elevation: 3,268 ft (996 m)
- Time zone: UTC-5 (Eastern (EST))
  - Summer (DST): UTC-4 (EDT)
- ZIP code: 28647
- Area code: 828
- GNIS feature ID: 1012893

Linville Falls is an unincorporated community located at the junction of Avery, Burke, and McDowell counties in the U.S. state of North Carolina. It is named after Linville Falls, a nearby waterfall in the Linville Gorge Wilderness.

== Attractions ==
Linville Falls is close to many of western North Carolina's outdoor attractions.

- Blue Ridge Parkway
- Linville Falls
- Linville Gorge Wilderness
- Linville Caverns

The Linville Falls Tavern was listed on the National Register of Historic Places in 2000 and the Franklin-Penland House in 2006.

== See also ==
- Linville River
