= Linville Falls Tavern =

- Linville Falls Tavern, (former)
- U.S. National Register of Historic Places
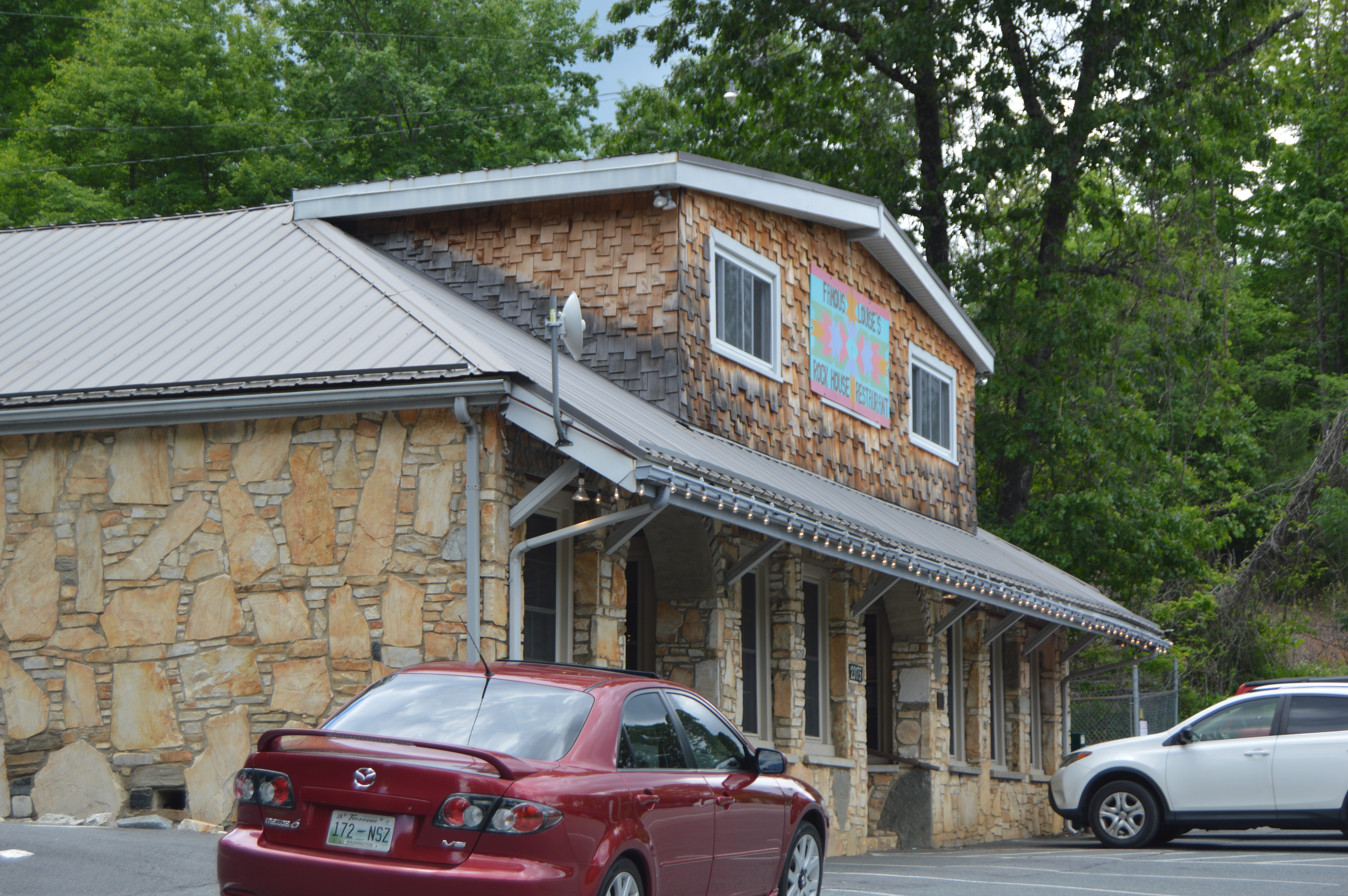
- Facade

- Location within North Carolina Location within the United States
- Location: U.S. Route 221 at Linville Falls, North Carolina
- Coordinates: 35°57′32″N 81°56′35″W
- Area: Less than 1 acre (0.40 ha)
- Built: 1936
- Built by: Lenoir Franklin
- Architectural style: Rustic Revival
- NRHP reference No.: 00001554
- Added to NRHP: December 28, 2000

Linville Falls Tavern, now known as Famous Louise's Rock House Restaurant, is a historic tavern located at Linville Falls, at the tri-point between Burke County, Avery County, and McDowell County, North Carolina. It was built in 1936, and is a 1 1/2-story, eight-bay, native stone Rustic Revival-style building. It has a hipped roof with dormers and two stone chimneys.

It was listed on the National Register of Historic Places in 2000.
