= West Union Street Historic District =

Historic district in North Carolina, United States

- U.S. National Register of Historic Places
- U.S. Historic district
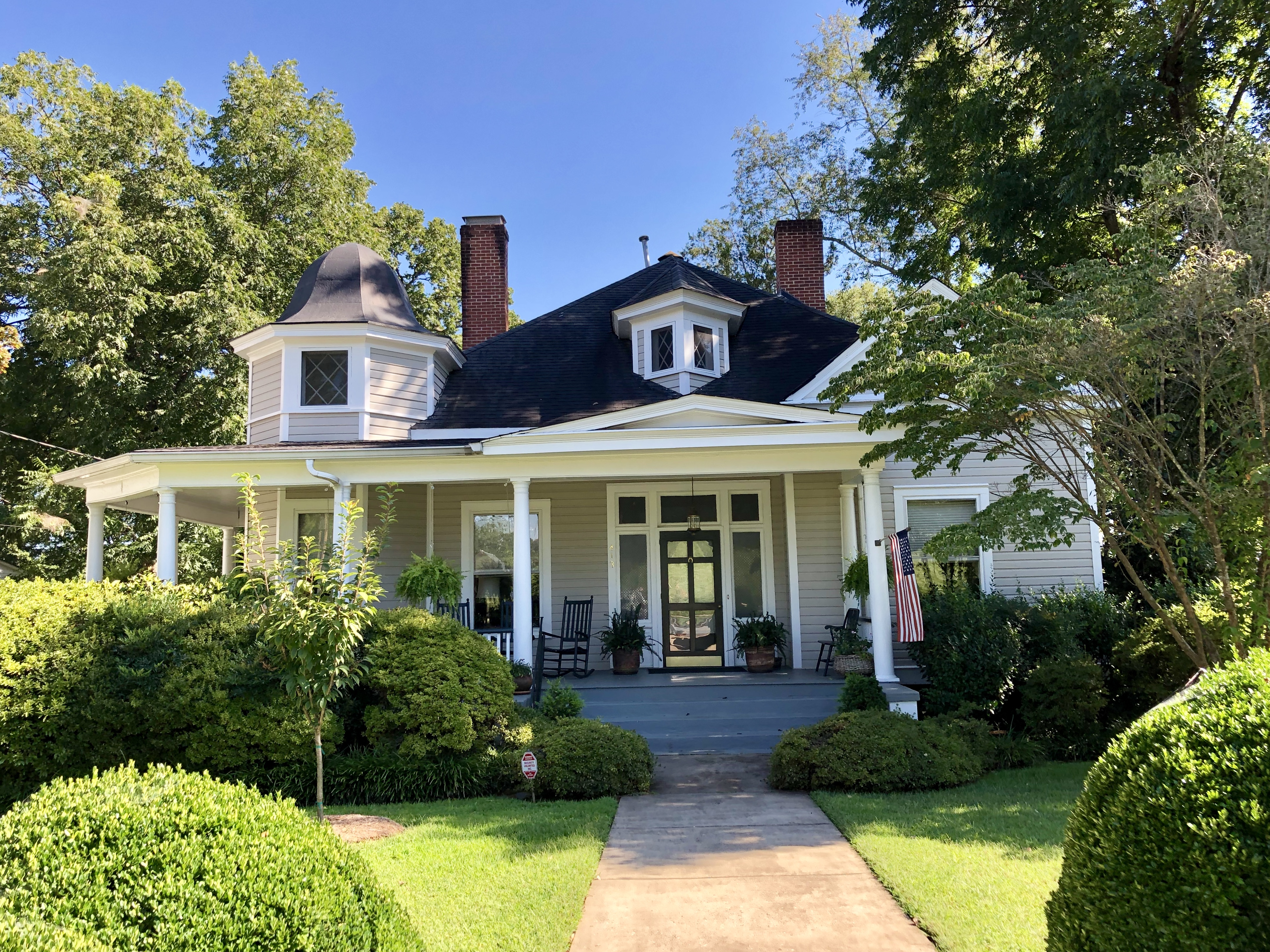
- A Contributing Structure on West Union Street

- Location within North Carolina Location within the United States
- Location: Roughly parts of W. Union St., Montrose St., & Riverside Dr., Morganton, North Carolina
- Coordinates: 35°44′26″N 81°41′42″W
- Area: 32.5 acres (13.2 ha)
- Architect: Multiple
- Architectural style: Late 19th And 20th Century Revivals, Bungalow/craftsman, Late Victorian
- MPS: Morganton MRA
- NRHP reference No.: 87001931
- Added to NRHP: November 9, 1987

West Union Street Historic District is a national historic district located at Morganton, Burke County, North Carolina. It encompasses 59 contributing buildings in a predominantly upper class residential section of Morganton. They were built between about 1815 and 1940, with the majority built between about 1890 and 1938. The district includes representative examples of Queen Anne, Colonial Revival, Bungalow / American Craftsman, and Late Victorian style architecture. Located in the district and listed separately is the Franklin Pierce Tate House.

It was listed on the National Register of Historic Places in 1987.
