= Jonesboro Historic District (Morganton, North Carolina) =

Historic district in North Carolina, United States

- U.S. National Register of Historic Places
- U.S. Historic district
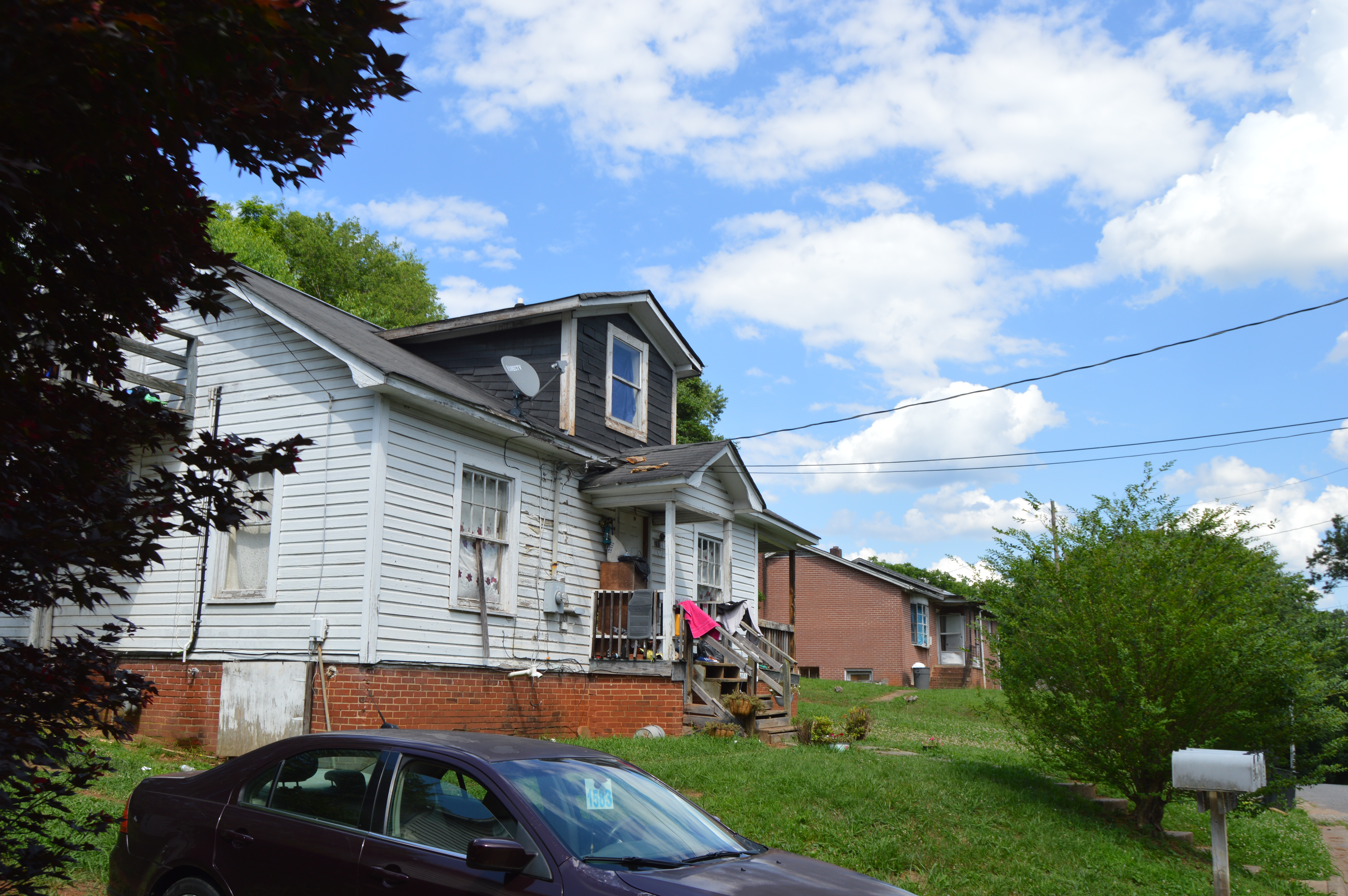
- Anderson Street

- Location within North Carolina Location within the United States
- Location: Roughly bounded by W. Concord, Bay, Jones, Lytle, & S. Anderson Sts., Morganton, North Carolina
- Coordinates: 35°44′34″N 81°41′12″W
- Area: 23.5 acres (9.5 ha)
- Built: 1895
- Built by: Philo Harbison
- Architectural style: Bungalow/craftsman, Shotgun
- MPS: Morganton MRA
- NRHP reference No.: 87001916
- Added to NRHP: November 9, 1987

Jonesboro Historic District is a national historic district located at Morganton, Burke County, North Carolina. It encompasses 35 contributing buildings and 1 contributing site in historically African-American neighborhood of Morganton. The primarily residential buildings were built between about 1895 and 1935. It includes representative examples of Bungalow / American Craftsman and Shotgun style architecture.

It was listed on the National Register of Historic Places in 1987.
