= Valdese, North Carolina =

- Town
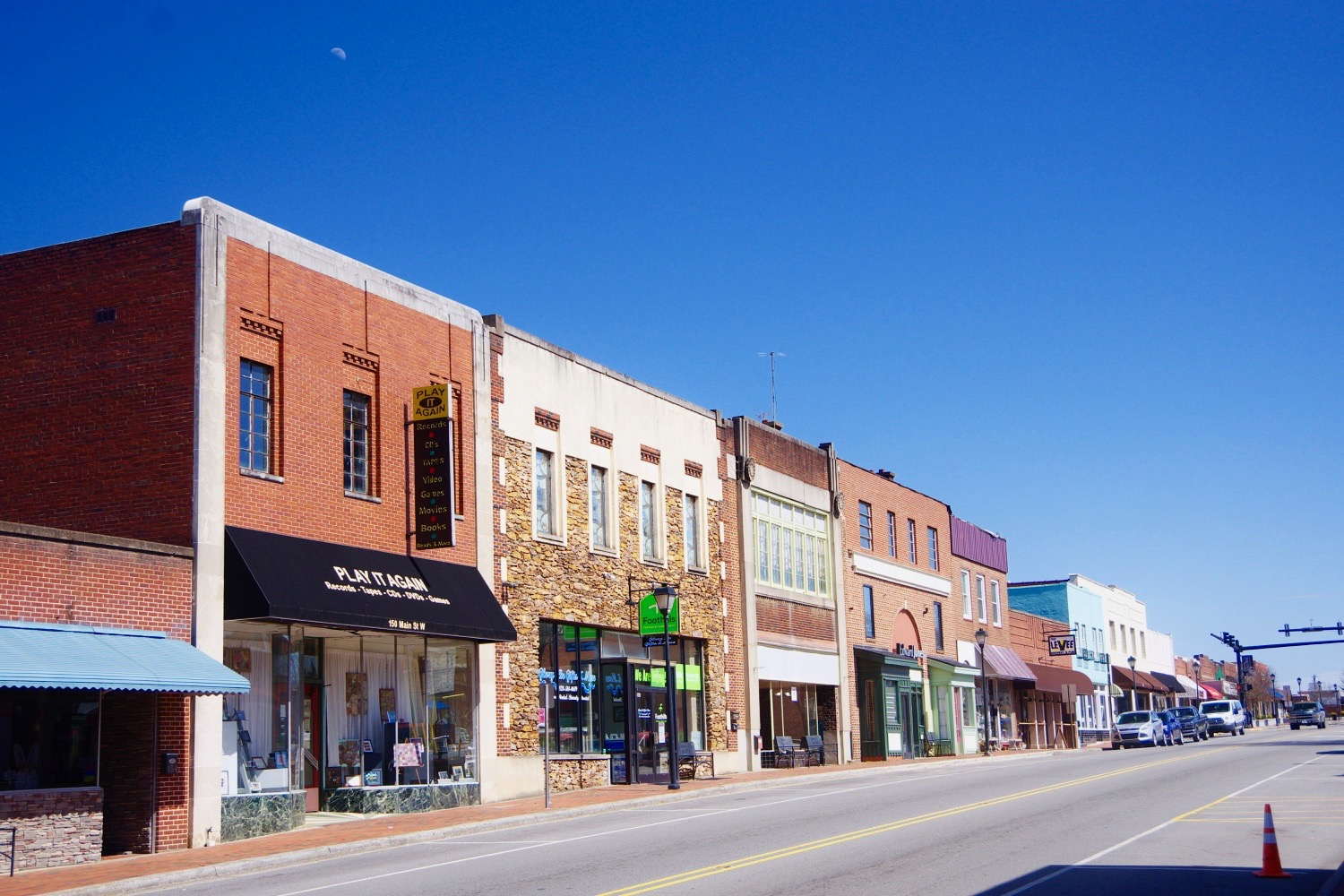
- Main Street (US 70)

- Flag Seal Logo

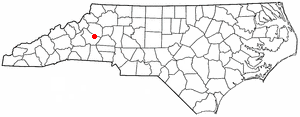
- Location of Valdese, North Carolina
- Coordinates: 35°44′39″N 81°32′54″W
- Country: United States
- State: North Carolina
- County: Burke
- Incorporated: 1920

Area
  - Total: 7.87 sq mi (20.39 km^{2})
  - Land: 7.86 sq mi (20.36 km^{2})
  - Water: 0.012 sq mi (0.03 km^{2})
- Elevation: 1,194 ft (364 m)

Population (2020)
  - Total: 4,689
  - Density: 596.6/sq mi (230.35/km^{2})
- Time zone: UTC-5 (Eastern (EST))
  - Summer (DST): UTC-4 (EDT)
- ZIP code: 28690
- Area code: 828
- FIPS code: 37-69520
- GNIS feature ID: 2406784
- Website: townofvaldese.com

Valdese (/ˈvældis/ VAL-dees) is a town in Burke County, North Carolina, United States. The population was 4,689 at the 2020 census. It is part of the Hickory-Lenoir-Morganton Metropolitan Statistical Area. One of the largest Waldensian congregations in the United States was founded in the town in the late nineteenth century, now known as the Waldensian Presbyterian Church. The town was settled by immigrants from the Cottian Alps in the Piedmont region of Italy.

== History ==
Settled in 1893 by a group of Waldensians from Northern Italy, the town was incorporated in 1920. The story of the town's founding is told in the outdoor drama From This Day Forward, which has been performed annually in Burke County since 1968.

In addition to Waldensian Presbyterian Church, the Jean-Pierre Auguste Dalmas House and Valdese Elementary School are listed on the National Register of Historic Places.

The Valdese News, a newspaper serving Burke County, was published there from 1938 through 1950.

== Geography ==
Valdese is located in eastern Burke County. It is bordered to the east by the town of Rutherford College. The Valdese town limits extend north to Rhodhiss Lake on the Catawba River, then follow the land along the southern side of the lake for 4 miles (6 km) to the west.

U.S. Route 70 passes through the town as Main Street, leading west 7 miles (11 km) to the center of Morganton, the county seat, and east 14 miles (23 km) to Hickory. Interstate 40 runs along the southern border of the town, providing access from exits 111 and 112.

According to the United States Census Bureau, the town has a total area of 7.7 square miles (20.0 km^{2}), of which 0.012 square miles (0.03 km^{2}), or 0.17%, is water.

== Demographics ==
Historical population
Census	Pop.	Note	%±
1930	1,816		—
1940	2,615		44.0%
1950	2,730		4.4%
1960	2,941		7.7%
1970	3,182		8.2%
1980	3,364		5.7%
1990	3,914		16.3%
2000	4,485		14.6%
2010	4,490		0.1%
2020	4,689		4.4%
U.S. Decennial Census

=== 2020 census ===
Valdese racial composition
Race	Number	Percentage
White (non-Hispanic)	4,097	87.37%
Black or African American (non-Hispanic)	77	1.64%
Native American	1	0.02%
Asian	160	3.41%
Pacific Islander	10	0.21%
Other/Mixed	183	3.9%
Hispanic or Latino	161	3.43%

As of the 2020 census, Valdese had a population of 4,689. The median age was 46.8 years. 19.7% of residents were under the age of 18 and 24.7% of residents were 65 years of age or older. For every 100 females there were 82.7 males, and for every 100 females age 18 and over there were 78.4 males age 18 and over.

95.3% of residents lived in urban areas, while 4.7% lived in rural areas.

There were 1,950 households in Valdese, including 1,104 family households. Of all households, 27.3% had children under the age of 18 living in them, and 32.3% were made up of individuals. About 17.3% of households had someone living alone who was 65 years of age or older.

There were 2,135 housing units, of which 8.7% were vacant. The homeowner vacancy rate was 1.1% and the rental vacancy rate was 9.7%.

=== Ethnic communities ===
The town has a large Italian-American and Hmong-American community. The town has an Italian-based flag, and Italian restaurants and bakeries are in abundance in the Valdese area. In addition to an Italian immigrant and second- and third-generation Italian-American community, there is a large Hmong-American community (a Southeast Asian ethnic group with origins in Laos, Thailand, China, and Vietnam), and Xieng Khouang Market Place, a Hmong/Southeast Asian-based store, is located in Valdese proper. There is also an ethnic Lao community in the Asheville-Hickory-Vardese area.

=== 2000 census ===
As of the census of 2000, there were 4,485 people, 1,886 households, and 1,180 families residing in the town. The population density was 823.8 inhabitants per square mile (318.1/km^{2}). There were 1,992 housing units at an average density of 365.9 per square mile (141.3/km^{2}). The racial makeup of the town was 91.53% White, 1.05% African American, 0.22% Native American, 3.99% Asian, 0.07% Pacific Islander, 2.25% from other races, and 0.89% from two or more races. Hispanic or Latino of any race were 4.91% of the population.

There were 1,886 households, out of which 28.3% had children under the age of 18 living with them, 46.5% were married couples living together, 12.0% had a female householder with no husband present, and 37.4% were non-families. 33.8% of all households were made up of individuals, and 16.5% had someone living alone who was 65 years of age or older. The average household size was 2.29 and the average family size was 2.90.

In the town, the population was spread out, with 23.5% under the age of 18, 7.0% from 18 to 24, 26.8% from 25 to 44, 22.1% from 45 to 64, and 20.6% who were 65 years of age or older. The median age was 40 years. For every 100 females, there were 83.7 males. For every 100 females age 18 and over, there were 78.6 males.

The median income for a household in the town was $30,617, and the median income for a family was $41,411. Males had a median income of $27,482 versus $22,429 for females. The per capita income for the town was $18,965. About 8.3% of families and 11.9% of the population were below the poverty line, including 15.7% of those under age 18 and 11.5% of those age 65 or over.

There is also an Occitan-speaking community.

== Notable people ==
- Hugh Blackwell, member of the North Carolina House of Representatives
- Bill Cline, CFL player
- Doug Cline, AFL linebacker for the Houston Oilers and San Diego Chargers
- J. Bazzel Mull, Christian minister and religious broadcaster in East Tennessee
- Alabama Pitts, professional athlete, convicted felon
- Stanley Pons, electrochemist
- Tyler Shatley, NFL offensive guard for the Jacksonville Jaguars
- George Shuffler, bluegrass musician

== Sister city ==
Valdese has one sister city, as designated by Sister Cities International:

- Torre Pellice, Italy
