= Sloan–Throneburg Farm =

Historic farm in North Carolina, United States

- U.S. National Register of Historic Places
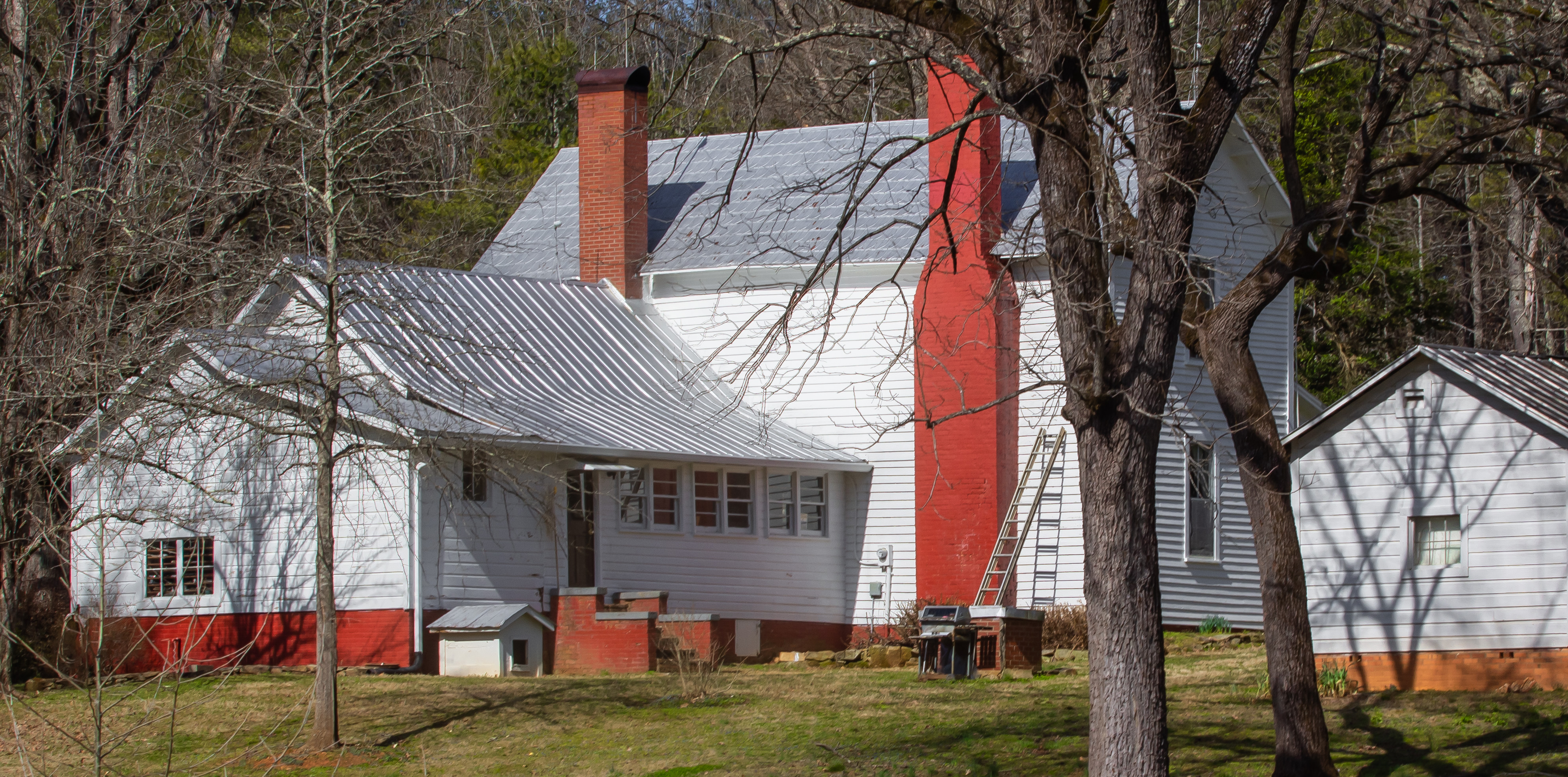

- Location within North Carolina Location within the United States
- Location: NC 1429, 0.3 miles W of jct. with NC 1450, near Chesterfield, North Carolina
- Coordinates: 35°50′36″N 81°39′27″W
- Area: 45 acres (18 ha)
- Built by: J.H. Sloan
- Architectural style: Greek Revival, I-house
- NRHP reference No.: 02000110
- Added to NRHP: March 1, 2002

Sloan–Throneburg Farm is a historic home and farm complex located near Chesterfield, Burke County, North Carolina. The main house was built about 1882, and is a two-story, three-bay, central hall plan frame I-house. Also on the property are the contributing landscape; Servant Dwelling, Ham House, and Wood Storage; Carriage House / Garage; Corncrib; Barn (1926); and Cave / Root Cellar.

It was listed on the National Register of Historic Places in 2002.
