= Rush R. Sloane House =

- U.S. National Register of Historic Places
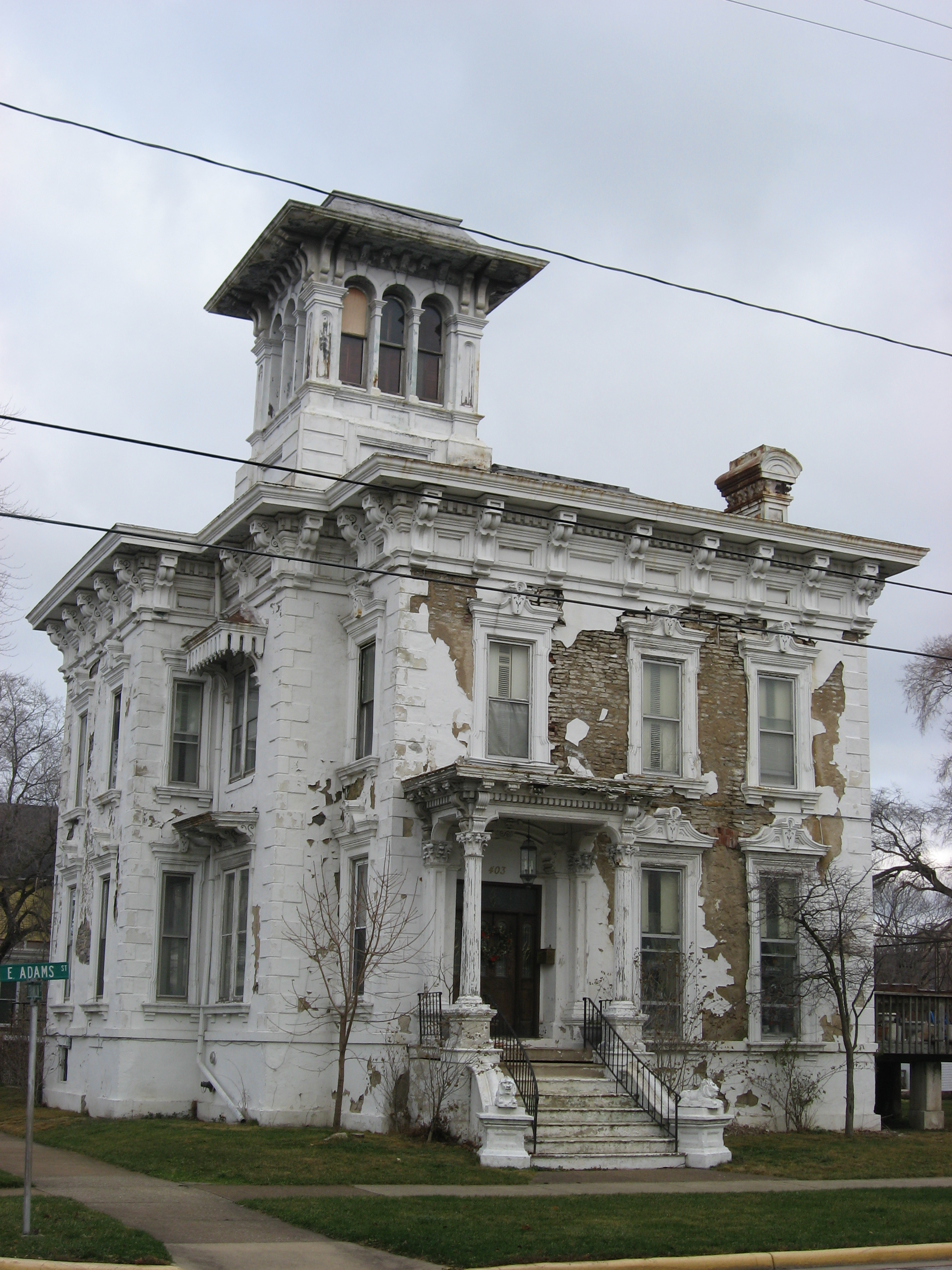
- Sloane House in 2011
- Location: 403 East Adams Street, Sandusky, Erie County, Ohio, United States
- Coordinates: 41.455555°N 82.705277°W
- Built: early 1850s
- Architect: Samuel Torrey
- NRHP reference No.: 75001390
- Added to NRHP: February 24, 1975

The Rush R. Sloane House is a historic residence in Sandusky, Ohio. The building was a reputed a prominent part of the Underground Railroad, a 19th century network for fugitive slaves. It is listed on the National Register of Historic Places since 1975. It is a private residence, not open to the public.

== History ==
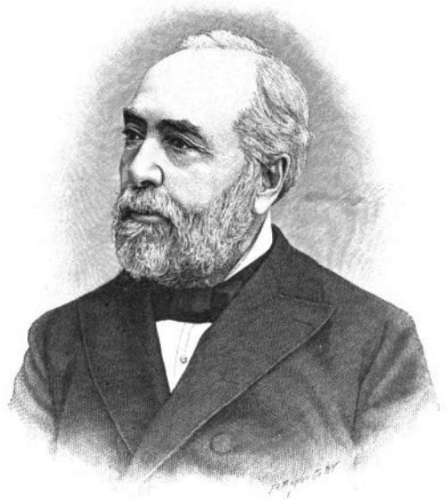
Rush Richard Sloane (1828–1908)

The homes builder and first owner was Samuel Torrey, and from this residence he conducted legal services and advocated on behalf of enslaved people. The exact date of build is unknown, but thought to be from the early 1850s. It is a three story tall stucco building with a "window's walk" enclosed tower, three bays; containing 10 bedrooms and 9 bathrooms.

It was later the home of former Sandusky Mayor, businessman, and abolitionist Rush Richard Sloane who purchased the building in 1853. It is believed that this building was once one of the many “safe houses” on the Underground Railroad, a decade prior to the American Civil War. The Sandusky Business College operated at 403 West Adams Street from 1923 until 1949.

== See also ==
- National Register of Historic Places listings in Erie County, Ohio
- National Register of Historic Places listings in Sandusky, Ohio
