= Tate House (Morganton, North Carolina) =

Historic house in North Carolina, United States

- U.S. National Register of Historic Places
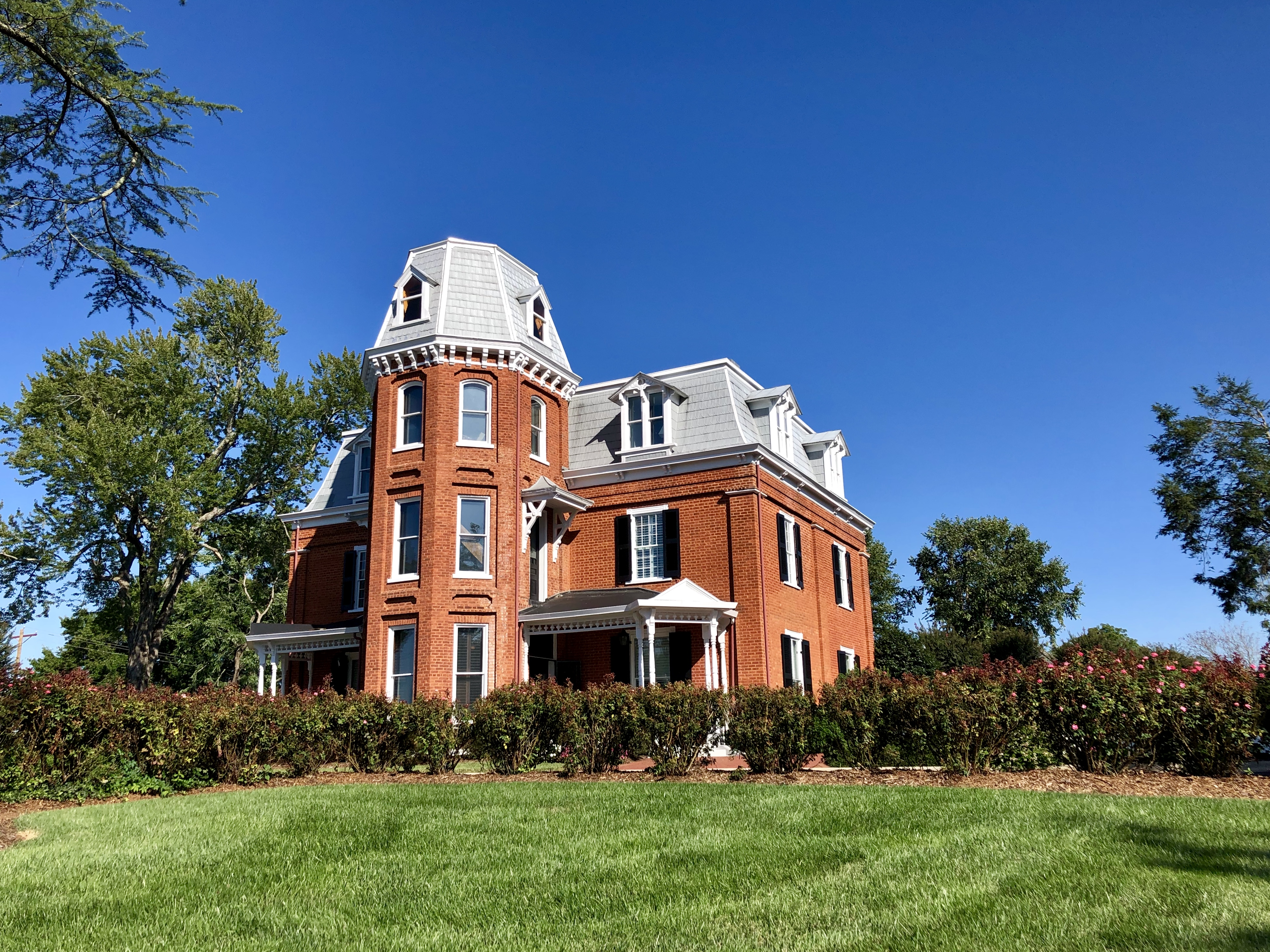
- The Cedars (Tate House), August 2019

- Location within North Carolina Location within the United States
- Location: 100 S. King St., Morganton, North Carolina
- Coordinates: 35°44′39″N 81°41′21″W
- Area: 3 acres (1.2 ha)
- Built: c. 1850, 1868
- Architectural style: Greek Revival, Second Empire
- NRHP reference No.: 73001300
- Added to NRHP: May 25, 1973

Tate House, also known as The Cedars, is a historic home located at Morganton, Burke County, North Carolina. The core was built about 1850, and is a two-story, three-bay, brick mansion with a center hall plan in the Greek Revival style. It was remodeled in the Second Empire style in 1868, with the addition of a mansard roof and large three-story octagonal tower. It was the home of Samuel McDowell Tate (1830–1897), who undertook the 1868 remodeling.

It was listed on the National Register of Historic Places in 1973.
