= Poor Catholics =

Historical early Catholic mendicant order

The Poor Catholics (Pauperes Catholici) were an early Catholic mendicant order, organized in 1208 and of short duration. Recruits were taken from the Pauperes Lugdunenses (the original name of the Waldensians); the distinguishing name was given by Pope Innocent III.

== Background ==
The background was the growth of the Waldensians in Provence. Innocent III complains bitterly, in a letter to the bishops, saying that the people are hungry for the Bread of Life, but that there is no one to break it for them. Public preaching, exclusively in the hands of the bishops, had become a rare event. Having thus far failed in its attempts to suppress the heresy, on account of the inadequate methods of its missionaries, the Catholic Church now adopted a new method, preaching the word of God and leading a life of evangelical poverty.

== History ==
=== Founding ===
The religious community of the "Poor Catholics" was founded by Durand of Huesca, a former disciple of Peter Waldo. Waldo had been excommunicated in 1184. Critical of certain practices of the Catholic clergy, Diego de Acebo, Bishop of Osma, viewed the Cathars even less favorably. In the early 1190s, he wrote Liber Antihaeresis against the Cathars.

In 1207, a religious conference was held between Catholics and Waldenses at Pamiers. Participating in the conference was mentor of Dominic of Caleruega (Domingo de Guzmán, St. Dominic, founder of the Order of Preachers, the Dominicans), Diego de Acebo Bishop of Osma, along with a number of other bishops. Shortly thereafter Durand and several other Waldenses returned to the Church. In 1208, they organized themselves into the religious community of the Poor Catholics for the conversion of Waldenses. Pope Innocent III granted formal approval in 1210, and Durand was elected prior.

=== Organization ===
Innocent III gave them, initially seven in number, a constitution by which they could retain their former rule of life. Aside from this, they had to make a profession of faith. After having promised allegiance to the pope and the doctrines of the Church, they entered upon their mission at the beginning of 1208. They wore a light gray habit and sandals.

Their chief occupation was the preaching of the word of God directed against the heretics. Innocent III placed himself as the sole director at the head of the organization, and gave them the name of "Pauperes Catholici", to show that they practiced poverty in common with the "Pauperes Lugdunenses" but were separated from them in enjoying the benefits and sympathy of the Church. The whole enterprise was looked upon as an innovation contrary to the established rights and privileges of the clergy. Laymen, although they had received the tonsure and were regarded as clerics, publicly preached the doctrine of the Church, under the protection of the supreme pontiff himself. This caused, on some occasions, tense relations with the local clergy, who were apt to discourage their congregants from supporting the Poor Catholics, whose only means of support were the daily offerings of the faithful.

The Poor Catholics were active, not only in Southern France, but as far as Milan, where they founded a school in 1209 to gather and educate recruits for their order. Within four years of their foundation, they extended their activities over the Dioceses of Béziers, Uzès, Nîmes, Carcassonne, Narbonne, Taragon, Marseilles, Barcelona, Huesca, and Milan.

=== Decline ===
After 1212, the group began to disintegrate. Innocent III had stood by them for four years, repeatedly urging the bishops to support them, and recommending them to the King of Aragon; he exempted them from taking the oath of allegiance, as this was contrary to the teachings of the Waldenses. They did not show positive results and, for this reason, the pope gave his attention to the Order of Preachers of St. Dominic and the Friars Minor of St. Francis of Assisi whose labours promised better results.

In 1237 Pope Gregory IX requested the provincial of the Preaching Friars to visit the provinces of Narbonne and Taragonna and compel the Poor Catholics to adopt one of the approved rules. In 1247, the bishops of Narbonne and Elne complained to the Pope that the Poor Catholics were preaching without permission of the local bishops, and spreading false doctrines. In 1257, most of the Poor Catholic groups were merged into the newly formed Hermits of St. Augustine, although some withdrew from the Order.

== Reconciled Lombards ==
Peter Waldes had not confined his teaching to Lyons. When he was expelled from that city, he decided to go to Rome and make a personal plea for his cause to the pope. Going through Lombardy, he propagated his ideas. The lay people readily accepted his views on religion and formed a religious body known by the name of Humiliates (humiliati). Some of them appeared in Rome with him the following year, 1179, and asked Pope Alexander III to sanction their rule or form of life, which consisted in leading a religious life in their separate homes, abstaining from the oath, and defending the Catholic doctrine by public preaching. The pope granted them permission to lead a religious life in their homes, but forbade them from preaching.

Continuing their former life, they were excommunicated by Pope Lucius III about the year 1184. In this state, they remained until 1201, when, upon presentation of their constitution, Innocent III reconciled them with the Church and reorganized them in conformity with their economic and religious customs, also approving of the name "Humiliati". This brought most of them back to the Church, but a number persevered in the heresy and continued their former life under the direction of the Poor of Lyons. Economic and religious difficulties, however, aggravated long-felt dissensions between the two groups and, in 1205, these non-reconciled Humiliates separated from the Lyonese and formed a distinct group, adopting the name of Poor Lombards, "Pauperes Lombardi".

In order to bring the Poor Lombards back to the Church, Innocent III founded and organized in 1210 the order of the Reconciled Lombards, under the immediate supervision of the supreme pontiff. The recruits were taken from the ranks of the Poor Lombards. Their first superior was Bernard Primus, a former Lombard leader, who, with a few followers, had given the impetus for the foundation of the order by presenting a rule of life to the pope.

The Lombards and the Humiliates gave manual labour the first place. Every member, irrespective of position or talent, had to learn a trade in order to make a living. This predominance of manual labour was also a deciding factor in the reorganization of the Reconciled Lombards. Two years later, however, Innocent III gave them a new constitution, in which he retained manual labour for all the members of the order, but declared it only of secondary value for the missionaries or friars to whom he assigned the study of Holy Scripture and preaching as their main occupation. He also makes a more definite division of the members into three classes, or orders, comprising respectively the missionaries or friars, the women who took the vows, and the married people. The object of this second constitution was to bring order into the chaos of social and religious agitation among the different classes of members and, at the same time, to bring the better elements to the front to train them for missionary work against the Cathari. The Reconciled Lombards, like the Poor Catholics, did not meet with the expectations of the Roman Curia.
