= Id Nostri Cordis =

Papal bull (1487)

Id Nostri Cordis Latin for 'Our Hearty Desires' Papal bull of Pope Innocent VIII
- Signature date: 27 April 1487
- Subject: Extermination of the Waldensians
- Text: In Latin; In English

Id Nostri Cordis ("Our Hearty Desires") was a papal bull of Pope Innocent VIII promulgated in Rome on 27 April 1487, which was the 5th Kalends of May 1487 on the Julian Calendar. It was later repeated and signed again in the convent of St Laurence in June 26, 1487. The bull outlined a plenary indulgence (forgiveness) for anyone who joined the crusades against the Waldensians. His commands extended to religious and secular powers and threatened excommunication for those who did not join. A copy of the original bull was kept in the Library at Cambridge for many years and is currently held in the unpublished medieval manuscripts Ms Dd.3.25. However, Trinity College Dublin in March 2023 has since published the Waldenses Prose document Processus Contra Waldenses which contains a copy of the bull in MS 266.

The bull was given to Albertus de Capitaneis (Alberto Cattaneo) who was the pope's legate and commissioner general for the employment in that same year and to the Dominican Friar Blaise Berra. The bull intended to strike at a group located in Lyon known as the Waldenses and specifically authorized a crusade in the regions of Dauphiné, Savoy, and Piedmont. Following the bull's publication, a Crusade was led into the valleys of the Waldenses and many were killed in the subsequent crusade prompting John Milton to write his sonnet On the Late Massacre in Piedmont.

== Background ==
Leading up to the promulgation of the bull, Rome had implemented inquisition for many years against the Waldenses in the northern regions of Italy. Dominican Inquisitor Reinerius Saccho had identified the Waldenses as the most dangerous of all the heretical groups for three reasons:

1. "First, because it is older; some say that it has existed from the time of Sylvester and others from the time of the apostles."
2. "Second, because it is more general; for there is scarcely any country in which this Sect is not."
3. "The third, because, while all other Sects excite the abhorrence of their hearers by the outrageousness of their blasphemies against God, this (namely of the Leonists) has a great appearance of piety; and they believe all things concerning God, and which are contained in the creed, rightly only they blaspheme the Romish Church which blasphemy a great multitude of the Laity are easily induced to believe. And, as we read in the Book of Judges, that Samson's foxes had different faces, but their tails tied together, so the heretics are divided into Sects among themselves, but in attacking the Church they are united. When there are, in one house, heretics of three Sects, of which each condemns the other, each one at the same time attacks the Romish Church and thus these crafty little foxes destroy the vineyard of the Lord, that is the Church, by their errors."

There were concerns about the Waldenses being taught to read the bible freely and Reinerius had remarked how some could recite the entire New Testament "word for word". The promulgation of the Bible in the vulgar tongue so widely, along with views contrary to the church of Rome which were deemed heretical, prompted the pope to launch a crusade against the Waldenses.

== Content ==
The chief call in the bull was for the "extermination and dispersion" of the heretics known as the Waldenses or the poor people of Lyons. Goods and possessions of the heretics were ordered to be seized and a dispensation was given for those who seized and distributed those goods.

== Summary of the Bull ==
The bull opened with a call to root out heresy summarizing the "displeasure that certain sons of iniquity inhabitants of the province of Evreux" were teaching heresy. The bull called to "extirpate such like and all other errors" whatsoever having transported himself unto that province. The inquisitors were ordered to overthrow the houses of habitation and plunder the goods of those heretics. A order was given to the "execution thereof against the forenamed Waldenses and all other heretics whatsoever to rise up in arms against them and by a joint communication of processes to tread them under foot as venomous adders". A joint cooperation with the civil and ecclesiastical powers was arranged for the carrying out of the decree. Absolution was promised to those who took "up the cross fighting or contributing or consenting thereunto from all".

The bull was ultimately signed off "and enacted in the foresaid convent of St Laurence without the walls of Pinerolo in the year from the nativity of our Lord one thousand four hundred and eighty seven on the fifth indiction and on the twenty sixth day of the month of June and in the third year of the popedom of the fore named our most holy lord Pope Innocent there being in the same place present the eminent men Heustanus Nomelli of Otzapio Bonifacius Bellini of Briceyrapio treasurers of the diocese of Ambelis the notaries as witnesses to the premises being called desired and joined to assist to the end that no innovation should be made by any body."

== Results ==
Following the release of the bull, commissioner Albert Cattaneo led the crusade against the Waldensians into the mountains and many were displaced or killed. On one occasion Cattaneo's commander La Palud had observed some Waldenses go into a nearby cave and ordered a fire be built at its entrance. After the fire was extinguished, the inside of the cave was examined and there was found to be 400 children dead in their mother's arms and about three thousand individuals perished from the smoke.

Those Waldenses who were taken captive were brought to a mass absolution at Embrun on April 27, 1488. Despite the return of some to Catholicism, their property was not returned as it had already been confiscated. Subsequent massacres prompted by the same policies included later piedmont massacres such as those 200 years later in 1655 which prompted the famous poet John Milton to pen his poem on the massacre at Piedmont.

== See also ==
- Waldensians
- Reformation
- On the Late Massacre in Piedmont
- Pope Innocent VIII
- Inquisition
- Crusades
