= Waldensians =

Christian movement

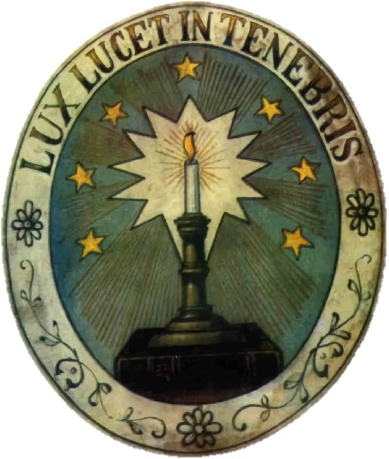
- Waldensian symbol Lux lucet in tenebris ("A light shines in the darkness")
- Classification: Proto-Protestant
- Orientation: Reformed
- Theology: Theology of Peter Waldo and other Waldensian theologians, nowadays also that of John Calvin and other Reformed theologians
- Region: Italy, Switzerland, France, Germany, Argentina, United States, Uruguay, and elsewhere
- Founder: Peter Waldo
- Origin: c. 1173; Lyon, Kingdom of Burgundy-Arles in the Holy Roman Empire (now France)
- Separated from: Catholic Church

The Waldensians, also known as Waldenses (/wɔːlˈdɛnsiːz, wɒl-/), Vallenses, Valdesi, or Vaudois, are adherents of a church tradition that began as an ascetic movement within Western Christianity before the Reformation. Originally known as the Poor of Lyon in the late 12th century, the movement spread to the Cottian Alps in what is today France and Italy. The founding of the Waldensians is attributed to Peter Waldo, a wealthy merchant who gave away his property around 1173, preaching apostolic poverty as the way to perfection.

In some aspects the Waldensians of the Middle Ages could be seen as proto-Protestants, but they mostly did not raise the doctrinal objections characteristic of sixteenth-century Protestant leaders. They came to align themselves with Protestantism: with the Synod of Chanforan on 12 September 1532, they formally became a part of what was to become the Calvinist tradition. They were nearly annihilated in the seventeenth century.

Congregations continue to be active in Europe (particularly in the Piedmont region of Northern Italy), South America, and North America. Organizations, such as the American Waldensian Society, maintain the history of the movement and declare their mission as "proclaiming the Christian Gospel, serving the marginalized, promoting social justice, fostering inter-religious work, and advocating respect for religious diversity and freedom of conscience."

Early Waldensian teachings came into conflict with the Catholic Church and by 1215 the Waldensians were declared heretical, not because they preached apostolic poverty, which the Franciscans also preached, but because they were not willing to recognize the prerogatives of local bishops over the content of their preaching, nor to recognize standards about who was fit to preach. Pope Innocent III offered the Waldensians the chance to return to the Church, and many did, taking the name "Poor Catholics". However, many did not, and were subjected to intense persecution and were confronted with organised and general discrimination in the following centuries.

In the sixteenth century, the Waldensians were absorbed into the Protestant movement, under the influence of early Swiss reformer Heinrich Bullinger. The main denomination within the movement was the Waldensian Evangelical Church, the original church in Italy. In 1975, it merged with the Methodist Evangelical Church to form the Union of Methodist and Waldensian Churches—a majority Waldensian church, with a minority of Methodists. Another large congregation is the Evangelical Waldensian Church of Río de la Plata in Argentina, Paraguay, and Uruguay. Waldensian churches are members of the Community of Protestant Churches in Europe and its affiliates worldwide.

== Terminology ==
Early Waldensians belonged to one of three groups:

- Sandaliati (those with sandals) received sacred orders and were to prove the heresiarchs wrong;
- Doctores instructed and trained missionaries;
- Novellani preached to the general population.

They were also called Insabbatati, Sabati, Inzabbatati, or Sabotiers—some historians such as the Jesuit Jacob Gretser proposed that this designation arose from the unusual type of sabot they used as footwear, though he noted limitations in the sources supporting his reasoning. Other historians such as Melchior Goldast and Jesuit Inquisitor Francis Pegne stated the name insabbatati was because of Sabbath-keeping in the manner of Jews, a tradition Inquisitor Moneta of Cremona railed against. In the early Waldenses prose tracts there existed an exposition on the 10 commandments which put forth their own explanation on the 4th commandment which defended Sabbath-keeping, and this is similarly attested by historians, such as Johann Gottfried Hering who defined the Sabbatati (a sect of the Waldenses) as those who kept the Sabbath with the Jews.

== Historical sources ==
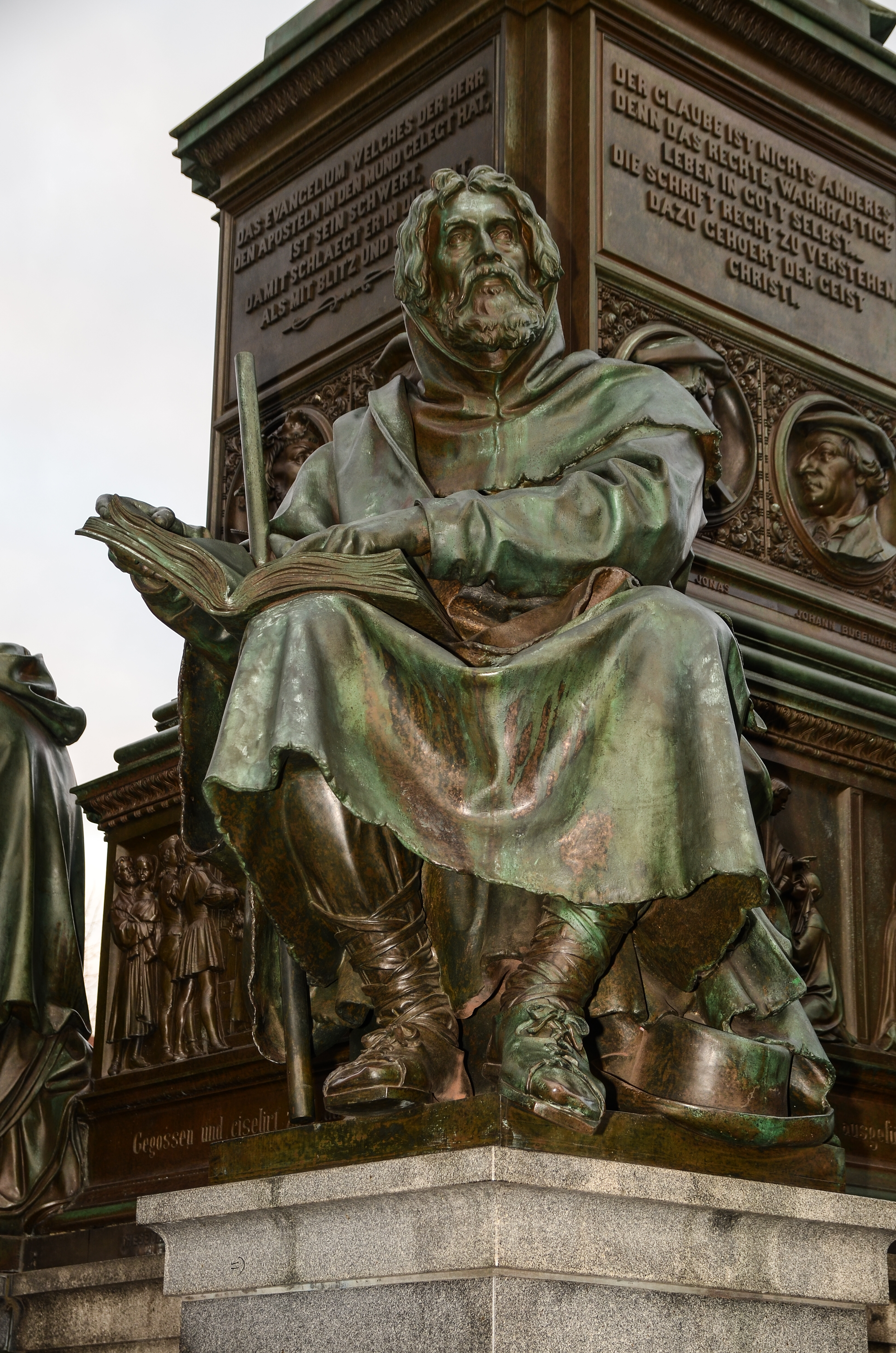
Statue of Peter Waldo at the Luther Monument in Worms

Most modern knowledge of the medieval history of the Waldensians originates almost exclusively from the records and writings of the Roman Catholic Church, the same body that was condemning them as heretics. Because of "the documentary scarcity and unconnectedness from which we must draw the description of Waldensian beliefs", much of what is known about the early Waldensians comes from reports like the Profession of faith of Valdo of Lyon (1180); Liber antiheresis by Durando d'Osca (c. 1187–1200); and the Rescriptum of Bergamo Conference (1218).

Earlier documents that provide information about early Waldensian history include the Will of Stefano d'Anse (1187); the Manifestatio haeresis Albigensium et Lugdunensium (c. 1206–1208); and the Anonymous chronicle of Lyon (c. 1220). There are also the two reports written for the Inquisition by Reinerius Saccho (died 1259), a former Cathar who converted to Catholicism, published together in 1254 as Summa de Catharis et Pauperibus de Lugduno (On the Cathars and the Poor of Lyon).

== Teachings ==
The early Waldensians were associated by councils and papal decrees with the Cathars; however they differed radically from them: the Waldensians never espoused gnostic or dualist views or mysticism, and they did not reject the sacraments in total. The Waldensians initially saw themselves as a "church within the Church" and sprang from the High Medieval pauperistic movement that saw the development of Franciscans etc.

The Waldensians taught certain doctrines also held by the Catholic Church: they accepted the Trinity, and the earliest Waldensians staunchly defended the Eucharist. However, at least some of them later began to develop a more symbolic view of the bread and wine.

The earliest Waldensians taught the real presence of Christ in the Eucharist and affirmed the necessity of priests for the offering of the Mass. However they denied the right of sinful priests to give the Eucharist.

Early forms of the Waldensian Mass sought to recover the early Christian liturgy and contained a sevenfold repetition of the Lord's Prayer, with the Eucharistic elements being consecrated through the sign of the cross. The Waldensians observed the forty-day fast of Lent and practiced Friday abstinence.

Both Waldensian and Catholic sources, however, imply that the Waldensians rejected infant baptism, at least to some extent. This is seen from the disputed The Noble Lesson, which refers to Christ specifically calling to baptize those who believed, and texts attributed to Reinerius Saccho mentioning how the Waldensians believed that the "ablution which is given to infants profits nothing". Thus there seems to have been an understanding among the Waldensians that infants could be saved without baptism. They rejected confession to priests, the practice of venerating the saints, the use of oaths, secular courts and prayers for the dead.

Waldensians held and preached a number of doctrines as they read from the Bible. These included:

1. The atoning death and justifying righteousness of Christ;
2. The Godhead;
3. The fall of man;
4. The incarnation of the Son;
5. The value or necessity of voluntary poverty;
6. Perhaps, the universal priesthood of believers, as according to de Bourbon they claimed that all good men are priests.

They also rejected a number of concepts that were widely held in Christian Europe of the era. For example, the Waldensians held that temporal offices and dignities were not meant for preachers of the Gospel; that relics were no different from any other bones and should not be regarded as special or holy; that pilgrimage served only to spend one's money; that meat might be eaten any day if one's appetite served one; that holy water was no more efficacious than rain water; and that prayer was just as effectual if offered in a church or a barn.

Some beliefs attributed to early Waldensians may have come from fabricated documents for polemic purposes, for example by English Puritan diplomat Samuel Morland, some of whose sources were immediately lost and anachronistic. These beliefs have early Waldensians speaking of the Catholic Church as the harlot of the Apocalypse, rejecting what they perceived as the idolatry of the Catholic Church and considered the papacy as the Antichrist of Rome. From Morland also comes the information that the early Waldensians rejected purgatory. These influenced Victorian views of the Waldensians, and the development of a myth or hypothesis of an earlier proto-Protestant community, the Vaudois.

The characterization of the early Waldensians as proto-Protestants has been questioned by modern scholars: while they may have had a form of sola scriptura they did not embrace sola fide in their view of justification; some emphasized a born-again experience.

La nobla leyczon (The Noble Lesson), written in the Old Occitan language, outlines the medieval Waldensian beliefs. It is believed that this poem was written some time between 1190 and 1240, but there is evidence that it was written in the first part of the fifteenth century. The Noble Lesson exists in four manuscripts: two are housed at the University of Cambridge, one at Trinity College in Dublin, and another in Geneva.

Works attributed to Reinerius Saccho gave the following charges against the Waldensians:

- The Pope is the head of all errors
- The Monks are Pharisees
- Christians should obey God instead of the Prelates
- That no one is above one another in the church
- No one should kneel before a priest
- Tithes should not be given
- Bishops should not have royal rights
- They condemn the Catholic sacraments
- The Church has erred by prohibiting the marriage of the clergy

The Waldensians would, later in their history, adopt a number of doctrines from the Reformed churches due to the French Reformer Guillaume Farel, who introduced Reformation theology to Waldensian leaders. They officially adopted Reformed theology at a conference at Cianforan 1532. As a result of the conference, the Waldensians officially modified some of their previous positions such as their rejection of secular courts.

== History ==
=== Origins ===
According to legend, Peter Waldo renounced his wealth as an encumbrance to preaching, which led other members of the Catholic clergy to follow his example. Because of this shunning of wealth, this early movement was known as The Poor of Lyon and The Poor of Lombardy.

Although they rose to prominence in the twelfth century, some evidence suggests that the Waldenses may have existed even before the time of Peter Waldo, perhaps as early as 1100. In 1179, at the Third Council of the Lateran, Pope Alexander III lamented that the Waldenses were a "pest of long existence". While the Inquisitor Reinerius Saccho in the thirteenth century also spoke about the dangers of the Waldenses for among other reasons its antiquity "some say that it has lasted from the time of Sylvester, others, from the time of the Apostles." In the seventeenth century, Waldensian Pastor Henri Arnaud stated that "the Vaudois are, in fact, descended from those refugees from Italy, who, after St Paul had there preached the gospel abandoned their beautiful country, like the woman mentioned in the apocalypse and fled to those wild mountains where they have to this day, handed down the gospel from father to son in the same purity and simplicity as it was preached by St Paul.

The Waldensian movement was characterized from the beginning by lay preaching, voluntary poverty, and strict adherence to the Bible. Between 1175 and 1185, Waldo either commissioned a cleric from Lyon to translate the New Testament into the vernacular—the Arpitan (Franco-Provençal) language—or was himself involved in this translation work.

In 1179, Waldo and one of his disciples went to Rome, where Pope Alexander III and the Roman Curia welcomed them. They had to explain their faith before a panel of three clergymen, including issues that were then debated within the Church, such as the universal priesthood, the gospel in the vulgar tongue, and the issue of voluntary poverty. The results of the meeting were inconclusive; in that same year, the Third Lateran Council condemned Waldo's ideas, but not the movement itself, while the leaders of the movement were not excommunicated for the moment.

The Waldensians proceeded to disobey the Third Lateran Council and continued to preach according to their own understanding of the Scriptures. In 1184, Waldo and his followers were excommunicated and forced from Lyon. The Catholic Church declared them heretics, stating that the group's principal error was contempt for ecclesiastical power. Rome also accused the Waldensians of teaching innumerable errors.

Waldo and his followers developed a system whereby they would go from town to town and meet secretly with small groups of Waldensians. There they would confess sins and hold service. A traveling Waldensian preacher was known as a barba. The group would shelter the barba and help make arrangements to move on to the next town in secret. Waldo possibly died in the early thirteenth century, possibly in Germany; he was never captured, and his fate remains uncertain.

Many among the Waldensians claimed that people such as Claudius of Turin and Berengar of Tours were first representatives of the sect, but in modern times claims of the Waldenses to high antiquity are no longer accepted. Some religious groups attempted to associate Vigilantius with proto-Waldensians in the European Alps.

=== Catholic response ===
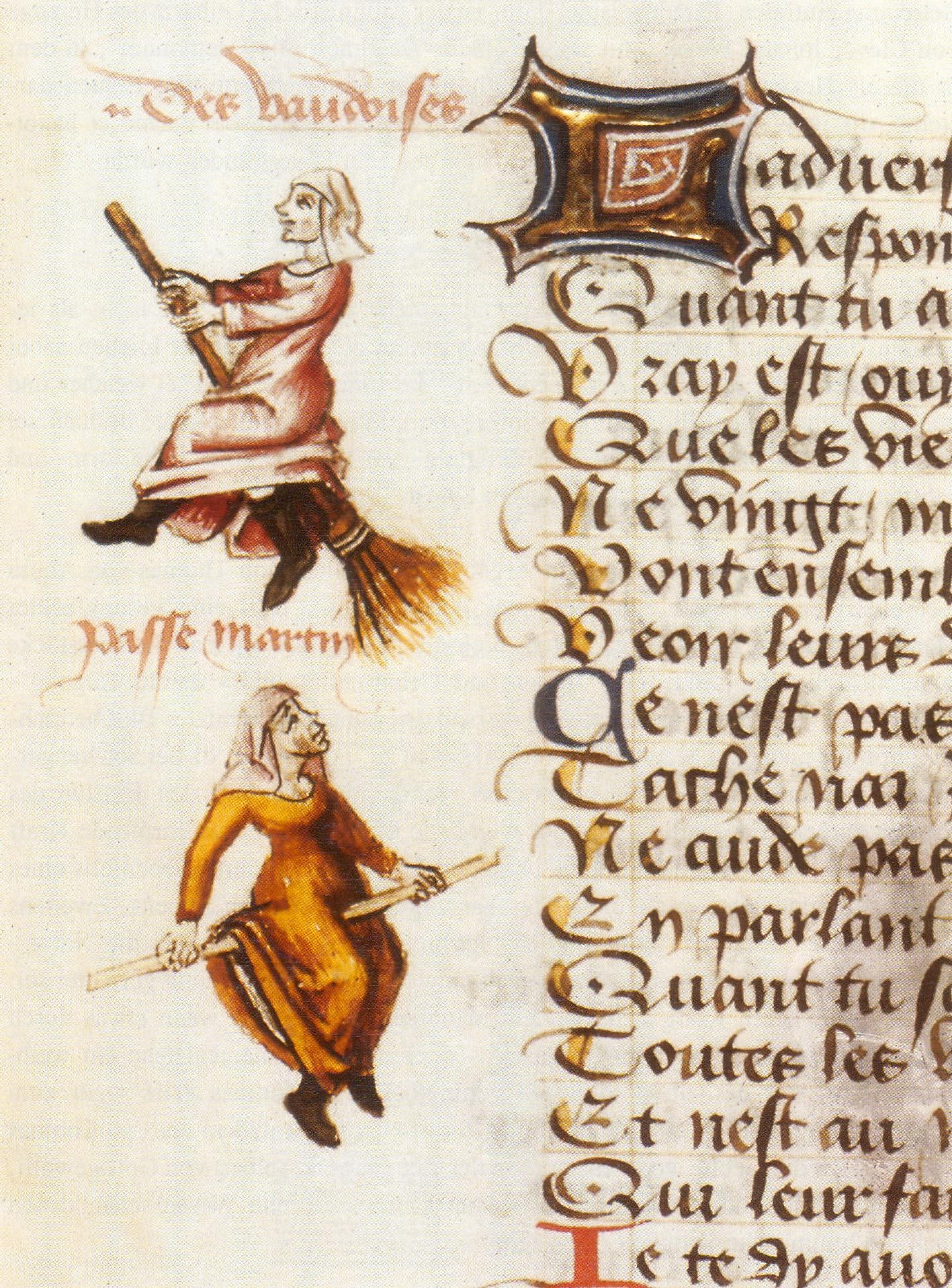
Illustrations depicting Waldensians as witches in Le champion des dames, by Martin Le France, 1451

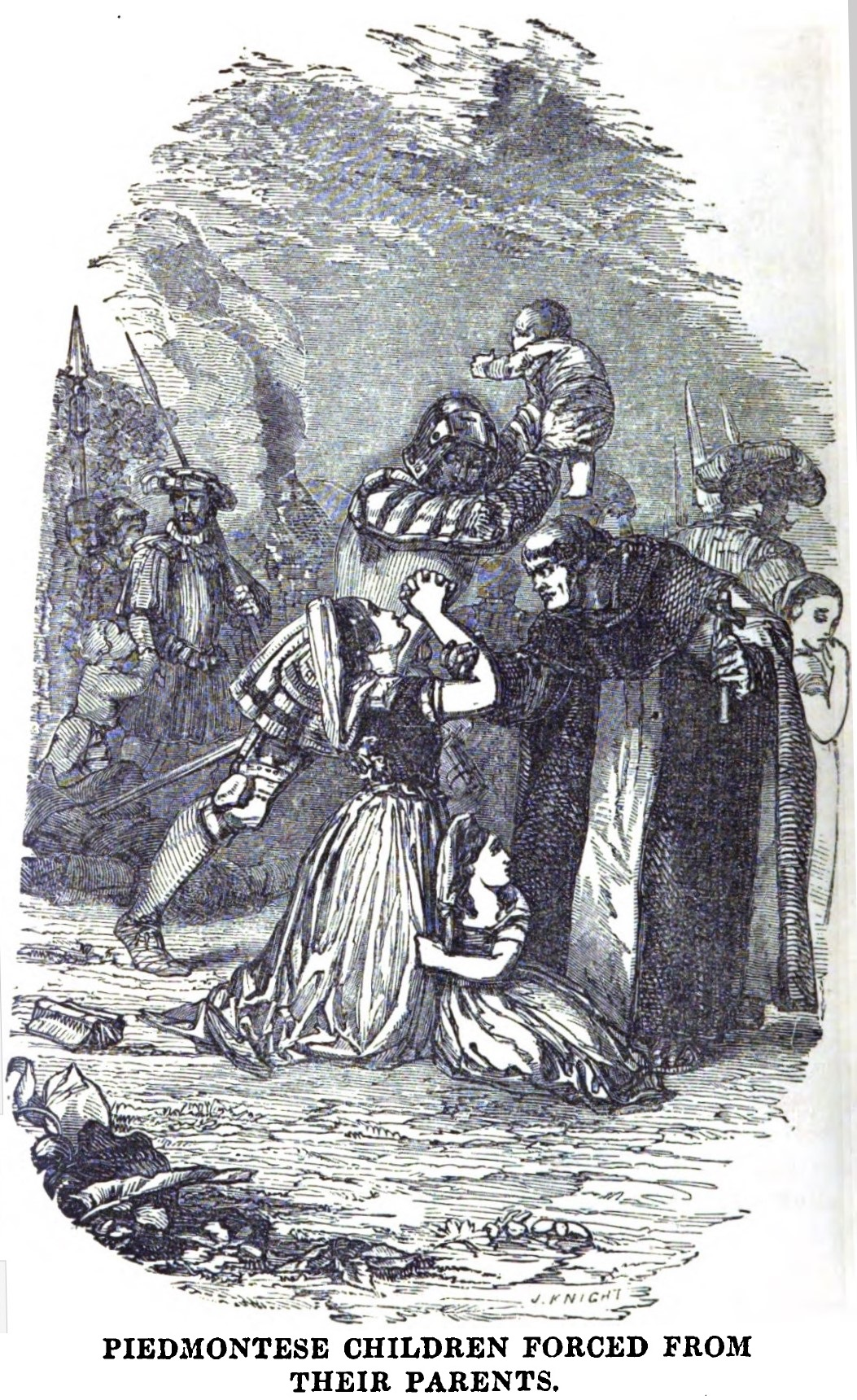
Piedmontese children forced from their parents

The Catholic Church viewed the Waldensians as unorthodox, and in 1184 at the Synod of Verona, under the auspices of Pope Lucius III, they were excommunicated.

In 1207 there was a religious conference of Catholics and Waldensians at Pamiers. Several leading Waldensians returned to Catholicism, notably including Waldo's disciple Durand of Huesca who went on to found an order the Poor Catholics intended to appeal to the Waldensian emphasis on evangelical poverty and to preach.

In 1211 more than 80 Waldensians were burned as heretics at Strasbourg; this action launched several centuries of persecution that nearly destroyed the movement. Pope Innocent III went even further during the Fourth Lateran Council in 1215, officially denouncing the Waldensians as heretics. In 1263, 17 Waldensians were condemned by Franciscan inquisitors in Marseille.

Waldensians briefly ruled Buda, the capital of Hungary, from 1304 to 1307.

In 1487 Pope Innocent VIII issued a bull, Id Nostri Cordis, for the extermination of the Vaudois. Alberto de' Capitanei, archdeacon of Cremona, responded to the bull by organizing a crusade to fulfill its order and launched a military offensive in the provinces of Dauphiné and Piedmont. Charles I, Duke of Savoy, eventually interfered to save his territories from further turmoil and promised the Vaudois peace, but not before the offensive had devastated the area and many of the Vaudois had fled to Provence or south to Italy.

The theologian Angelo Carletti di Chivasso, whom Innocent VIII in 1491 appointed Apostolic Nuncio and Commissary conjointly with the Bishop of Mauriana, was involved in reaching a peaceful agreement between Catholics and Waldensians.

=== Reformation ===
When the news of the Reformation reached the Waldensian Valleys, the Tavola Valdese decided to seek fellowship with the nascent Protestantism. At a meeting held in 1526 in Laus, a town in the Chisone valley, it was decided to send envoys to examine the new movement. In 1532, they met with German and Swiss Protestants and ultimately adapted their beliefs to those of the Reformed Church.

The Swiss and French Reformed churches sent William Farel and Anthony Saunier to attend the meeting of Chanforan, which convened on 12 October 1532. Farel invited them to join the Reformation and to emerge from secrecy. A Confession of Faith, with Reformed doctrines, was formulated and the Waldensians decided to worship openly in French.

The French Bible, translated by Pierre Robert Olivétan with the help of Calvin and published at Neuchâtel in 1535, was based in part on a New Testament in the Waldensian vernacular. The churches in Waldensia collected 1500 gold crowns to cover the cost of its publication.

==== Massacre of Mérindol (1545) ====
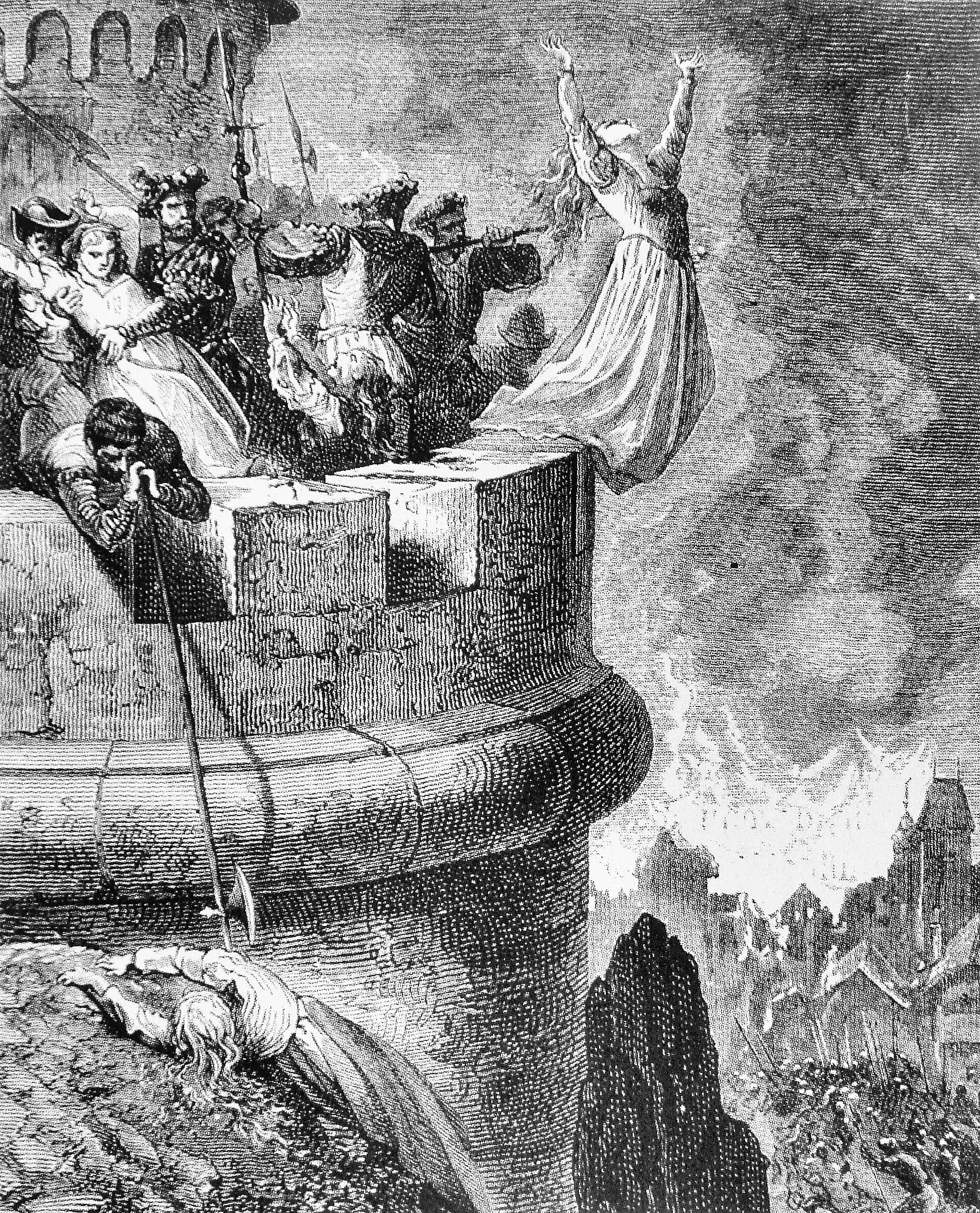
Massacre of the Mérindol Waldensians in 1545

Outside the Piedmont, the Waldenses joined the local Protestant churches in Bohemia, France, and Germany. After they came out of seclusion and reports were made of sedition on their part, French King Francis I on 1 January 1545 issued the "Arrêt de Mérindol", and assembled an army against the Waldensians of Provence. The leaders in the 1545 massacres were Jean Maynier d'Oppède, First President of the parliament of Provence, and the military commander Antoine Escalin des Aimars, who was returning from the Italian Wars with 2,000 veterans, the Bandes de Piémont. Deaths in the Massacre of Mérindol ranged from hundreds to thousands, depending on the estimates, and several villages were devastated.

The treaty of 5 June 1561 granted amnesty to the Protestants of the Valleys, including liberty of conscience and freedom to worship. Prisoners were released and fugitives permitted to return home, but despite this treaty, the Vaudois, with the other French Protestants, still suffered during the French Wars of Religion in 1562–1598.

As early as 1631, Protestant scholars began to regard the Waldensians as early forerunners of the Reformation, in a manner similar to the way the followers of John Wycliffe and Jan Hus, also persecuted by authorities, were viewed.

Although the Waldensian church was granted some rights and freedoms under French King Henry IV, with the Edict of Nantes in 1598, persecution rose again in the seventeenth century, with an extermination of the Waldensians attempted by the Duke of Savoy in 1655. This led to the exodus and dispersion of the Waldensians to other parts of Europe and even to the Western Hemisphere.

==== Piedmont Easter ====
In January 1655, the Duke of Savoy commanded the Waldensians to attend Mass or remove to the upper valleys of their homeland, giving them twenty days in which to sell their lands. Being in the midst of winter, the order was intended to persuade the Vaudois to choose the former; however, the bulk of the populace instead chose the latter, abandoning their homes and lands in the lower valleys and removing to the upper valleys. It was written that these targets of persecution, including old men, women, little children and the sick "waded through the icy waters, climbed the frozen peaks, and at length reached the homes of their impoverished brethren of the upper Valleys, where they were warmly received."

By mid-April, when it became clear that the Duke's efforts to force the Vaudois to conform to Catholicism had failed, he tried another approach. Under the guise of false reports of Vaudois uprisings, the Duke sent troops into the upper valleys to quell the local populace. He required that the local populace quarter the troops in their homes, which the local populace complied with. But the quartering order was a ruse to allow the troops easy access to the populace. On 24 April 1655, at 4 a.m., the signal was given for a general massacre.

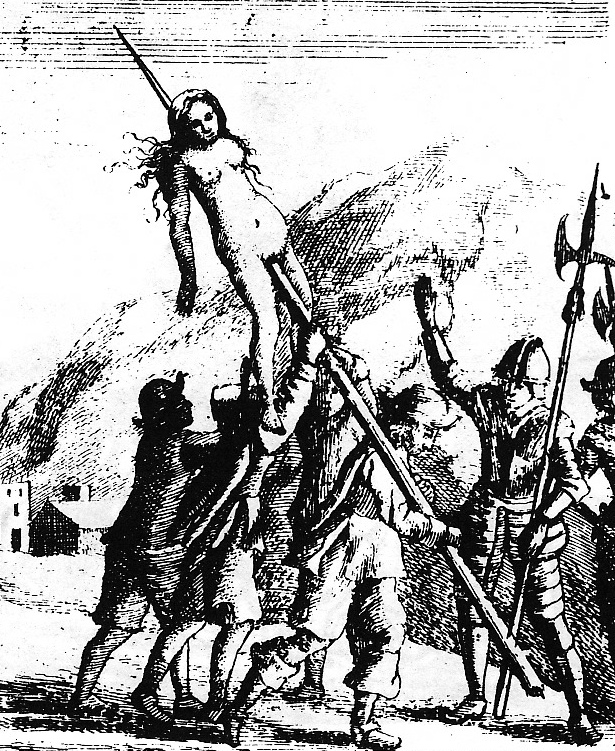
Print illustrating the 1655 massacre in La Torre, from Samuel Moreland's History of the Evangelical Churches of the Valleys of Piedmont, published in London in 1658

The Duke's forces did not simply slaughter the inhabitants. They are reported to have unleashed an unprovoked campaign of looting, rape, torture, and murder. According to one report by a Peter Liegé:

Little children were torn from the arms of their mothers, clasped by their tiny feet, and their heads dashed against the rocks; or were held between two soldiers and their quivering limbs torn up by main force. Their mangled bodies were then thrown on the highways or fields, to be devoured by beasts. The sick and the aged were burned alive in their dwellings. Some had their hands and arms and legs lopped off, and fire applied to the severed parts to staunch the bleeding and prolong their suffering. Some were flayed alive, some were roasted alive, some disemboweled; or tied to trees in their own orchards, and their hearts cut out. Some were horribly mutilated, and of others the brains were boiled and eaten by these cannibals. Some were fastened down into the furrows of their own fields, and ploughed into the soil as men plough manure into it. Others were buried alive. Fathers were marched to death with the heads of their sons suspended round their necks. Parents were compelled to look on while their children were first outraged [raped], then massacred, before being themselves permitted to die.

This massacre became known as the Piedmont Easter. An estimate of some 1,700 Waldensians were slaughtered; the massacre was so brutal it aroused indignation throughout Europe. Protestant rulers in northern Europe offered sanctuary to the remaining Waldensians. Oliver Cromwell, then ruler in England, began petitioning on behalf of the Waldensians, writing letters, raising contributions, calling a general fast in England and threatening to send military forces to the rescue. The massacre prompted John Milton's poem on the Waldenses, "On the Late Massacre in Piedmont". Swiss and Dutch Calvinists set up an "underground railroad" to bring many of the survivors north to Switzerland and even as far as the Dutch Republic, where the councillors of the city of Amsterdam chartered three ships to take some 167 Waldensians to their City Colony in the New World (Delaware) on Christmas Day 1656. Those that stayed behind in France and the Piedmont formed a guerilla resistance movement led by a farmer, Joshua Janavel, which lasted into the 1660s.

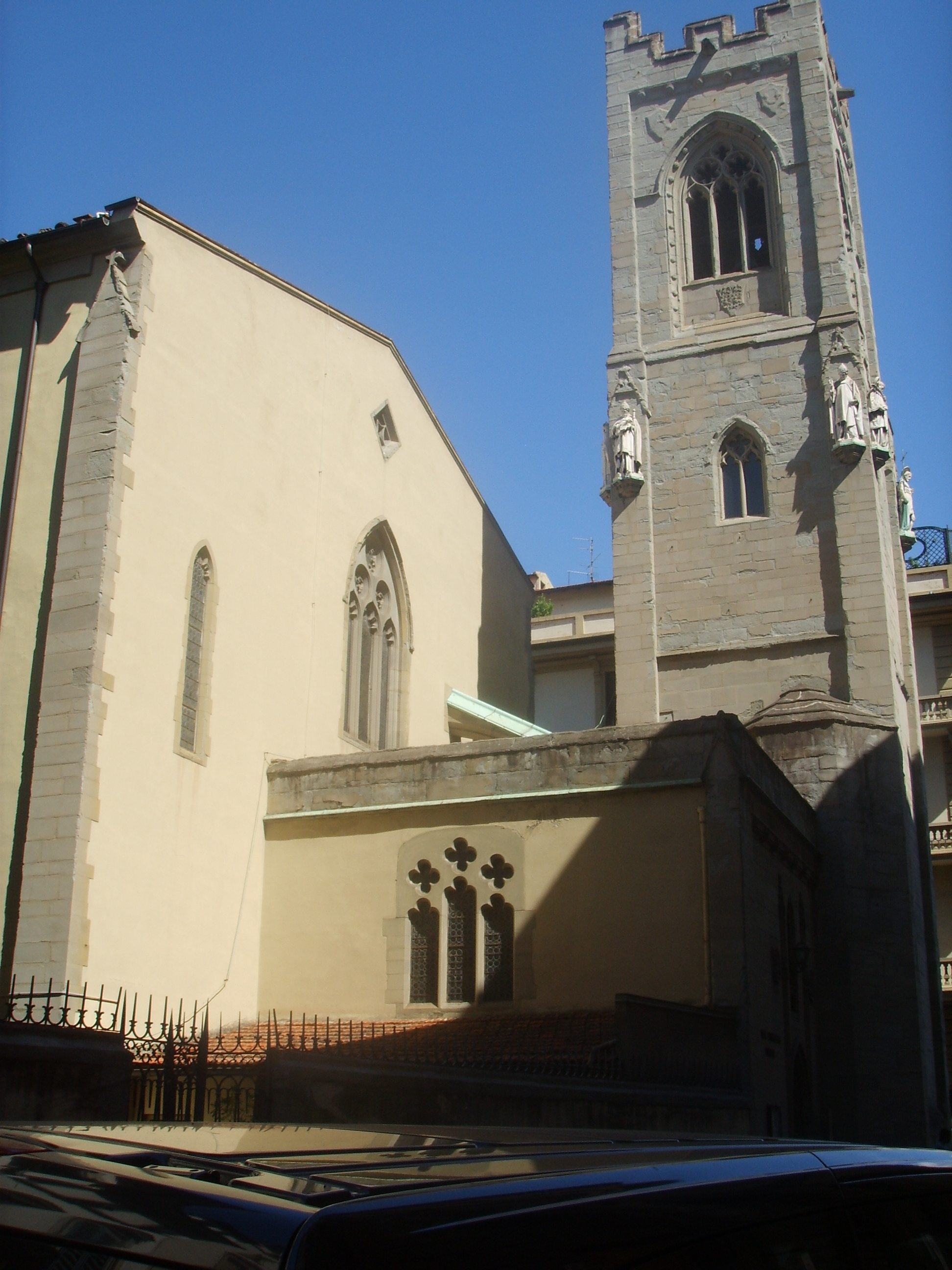
Waldensian Church of Florence, Italy

=== Revocation of the Edict of Nantes and the "Glorious Return" ===
In 1685 Louis XIV revoked the 1598 Edict of Nantes, which had guaranteed freedom of religion to his Protestant subjects in France. French troops sent into the French Waldensian areas of the Chisone and Susa Valleys in the Dauphiné forced 8,000 Vaudois to convert to Catholicism and another 3,000 to leave for Germany.

In the Piedmont, the cousin of Louis, the newly ascended Duke of Savoy, Victor Amadeus II, followed his uncle in removing the protection of Protestants in the Piedmont. In the renewed persecution, and in an echo of the Piedmont Easter Massacre of only three decades earlier, the Duke issued an edict on 31 January 1686 that decreed the destruction of all the Vaudois churches and that all inhabitants of the Valleys should publicly announce their error in religion within fifteen days under penalty of death and banishment. But the Vaudois remained resistant. After the fifteen days, an army of 9,000 French and Piedmontese soldiers invaded the Valleys against the estimated 2,500 Vaudois, but found that every village had organized a defense force that kept the French and Piedmontese soldiers at bay.

On 9 April, the Duke of Savoy issued a new edict, enjoining the Waldensians to put down their arms within eight days and go into exile between 21 and 23 April. If able, they were free to sell their land and possessions to the highest bidder.

Waldensian pastor Henri Arnaud (1641–1721), who had been driven out of the Piedmont in the earlier purges, returned from Holland. On 18 April he made a stirring appeal before an assembly at Roccapiatta, winning over the majority in favor of armed resistance. When the truce expired on 20 April, the Waldensians were prepared for battle.

They put up a brave fight over the next six weeks, but by the time the Duke retired to Turin on 8 June, the war seemed decided: 2,000 Waldensians had been killed; another 2,000 had "accepted" the Catholic theology of the Council of Trent. Another 8,000 had been imprisoned, more than half of whom died of deliberately imposed starvation, or of sickness within six months.

But about two or three hundred Vaudois fled to the hills and began carrying out a guerilla war over the next year against the Catholic settlers who arrived to take over the Vaudois lands. These "Invincibles" continued their assaults until the Duke finally relented and agreed to negotiate. The "Invincibles" won the right for the imprisoned Vaudois to be released from prison and to be provided safe passage to Geneva. But the Duke, granting that permission on 3 January 1687, required that the Vaudois leave immediately or convert to Catholicism. This edict led to some 2,800 Vaudois leaving the Piedmont for Geneva, of whom only 2,490 survived the journey.

Arnaud and others now sought help of the allied European powers. He appealed to William of Orange directly from Geneva, while others, amongst whom was the young L'Hermitage, were sent to England and other lands to canvas for support. Orange and the allies were glad of any excuse to antagonise France, whose territorial encroachments on all fronts were intolerable. The League of Augsburg was formed in 1686 under Orange, who promised support to Arnaud. In August 1689, in the midst of the wars between the League of Augsburg and France, Arnaud led 1,000 Swiss exiles, armed with modern weaponry provided by the Dutch, back to the Piedmont. Over a third of the force perished during the 130-mile trek. They successfully re-established their presence in the Piedmont and drove out the Catholic settlers, but they continued to be besieged by French and Piedmontese troops.

By 2 May 1689, with only 300 Waldensian troops remaining, and cornered on a high peak called the Balsiglia, by 4,000 French troops with cannons, the final assault was delayed by storm and then by cloud cover. The French commander was so confident of completing his job the next morning that he sent a message to Paris that the Waldensian force had already been destroyed. However, when the French awoke the next morning they discovered that the Waldensians, guided by one of their number familiar with the Balsiglia, had already descended from the peak during the night and were now miles away.

The French pursued, but only a few days later a sudden change of political alliance by the Duke, from France to the League of Augsburg, ended the French pursuit of the Waldensians. The Duke agreed to defend the Waldensians and called for all other Vaudois exiles to return home to help protect the Piedmont borders against the French, in what came to be known as the "Glorious Return".

=== Religious freedom after the French Revolution ===
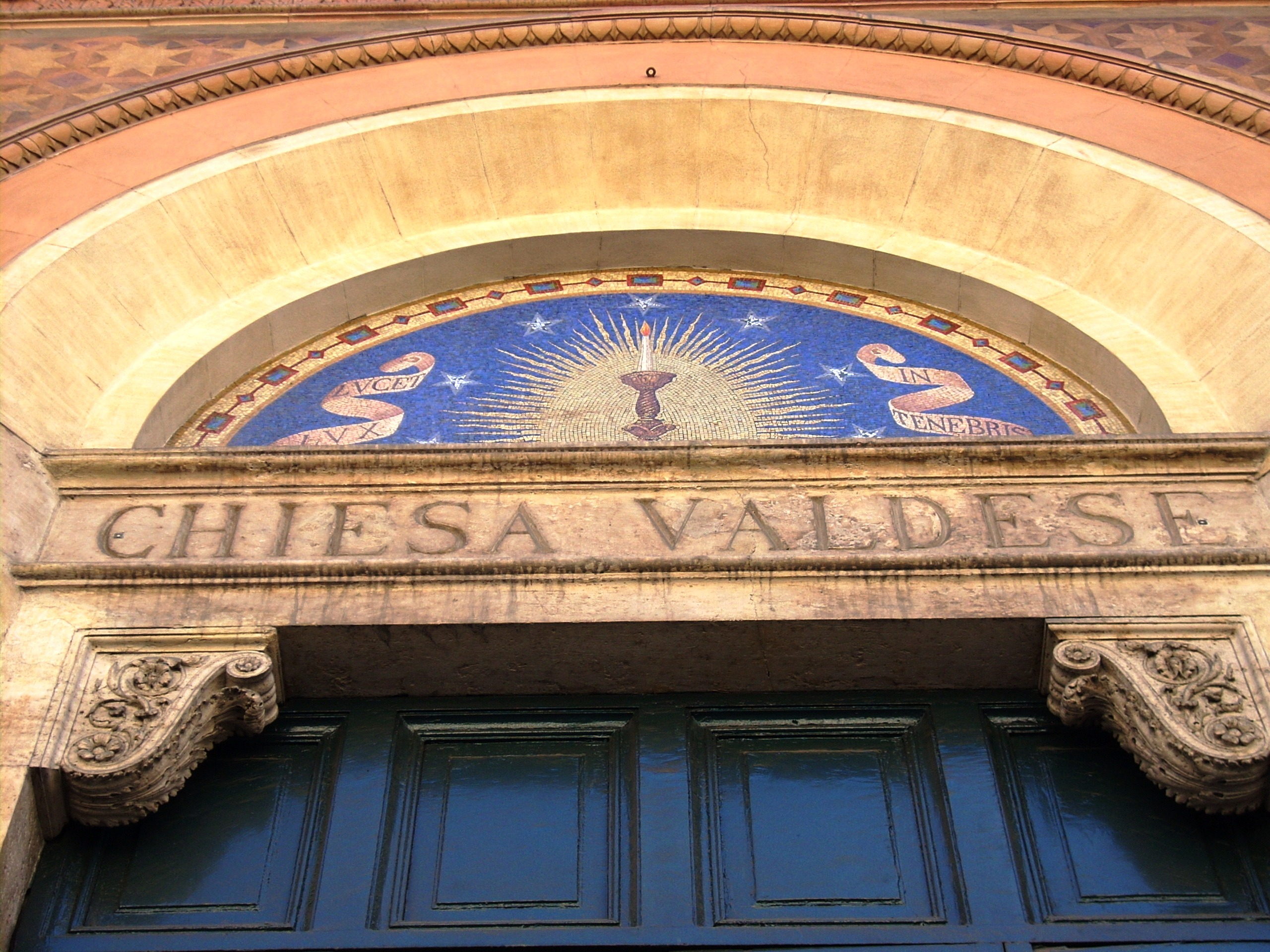
Waldensian Church entrance in Rome, Italy

After the French Revolution, the Waldenses of Piedmont were assured liberty of conscience and, in 1848, the ruler of Savoy, King Charles Albert of Sardinia, granted them civil rights.

Enjoying religious freedom, the Waldensians began migrating outside their valleys. By the time of Italian unification, the Waldensian had congregations throughout the peninsula, some originated by preaching, others by migration. However, poverty, societal discrimination, and demographic pressure led the Waldensians to emigrate, first as seasonal workers to the French Riviera and Switzerland, and later to Colonia Valdense in Uruguay, Jacinto Aráuz in La Pampa, Argentina and ultimately, to the United States. Those who remained in Italy have experienced upward social mobility. Waldensian companies dominated Turin's chocolate industry for the latter half of the nineteenth century and are generally credited with the invention of gianduja (hazelnut chocolate).

Waldensian scholarship also flourished in the nineteenth century. Copies of the Romaunt version of the Gospel of John were preserved in Paris and Dublin. The manuscripts were used as the basis of a work by William Stephen Gilly published in 1848, in which he described the history of the New Testament in use by the Waldensians. The Waldensian College began training ministers in 1855, first in Torre Pellice. A few years later, the Waldensian College relocated to Florence and, in 1922, to Rome. Economic and social integration have eased acceptance of ethnic Waldensians into Italian society. Writers like Italo Calvino and politicians like Domenico Maselli and Valdo Spini are of Waldensian background. The church has also attracted intellectuals as new adherents and supporters and enjoys significant financial support from non-adherent Italians.

In 2015, after a historic visit to a Waldensian Temple in Turin, Pope Francis, in the name of the Catholic Church, asked Waldensian Christians for forgiveness for their persecution. The Pope apologized for the Church's "un-Christian and even inhumane positions and actions".

=== Characteristics of the modern Waldensian Church ===
The present Waldensian Church considers itself to be a Protestant church of the Reformed tradition originally framed by Huldrych Zwingli and John Calvin. It recognizes as its doctrinal standard the confession of faith published in 1655 and based on the Reformed confession of 1559. It admits only two ceremonies, baptism and the Lord's Supper. Supreme authority in the body is exercised by an annual synod, and the affairs of the individual congregations are administered by a consistory under the presidency of the pastor.

Over the centuries, Waldensian churches have been established in countries as far away from France as Uruguay and the United States where the active Waldensian congregations continue the purpose of the Waldensian movement. The contemporary and historic Waldensian spiritual heritage describes itself as proclaiming the Gospel, serving the marginalized, promoting social justice, fostering inter-religious work, and advocating respect for religious diversity and freedom of conscience. Today, the Waldensian Church is member of the World Communion of Reformed Churches, the World Methodist Council, the Federation of Evangelical Churches in Italy, and the World Council of Churches.

=== Influence ===
The Waldensians were influences to the Zwickau Prophets who came out in support of believer's baptism. The Waldensians also influenced some in the Bohemian reformation, especially Petr Chelčický. Petr Chelčický was influenced by the Waldensians very early in his life, as there existed Waldensian congregations in the area of his birth.

However, on the other hand, some Hussites rejected Waldensian doctrines, including Jacob of Miles.

== Appraisal by Protestants ==
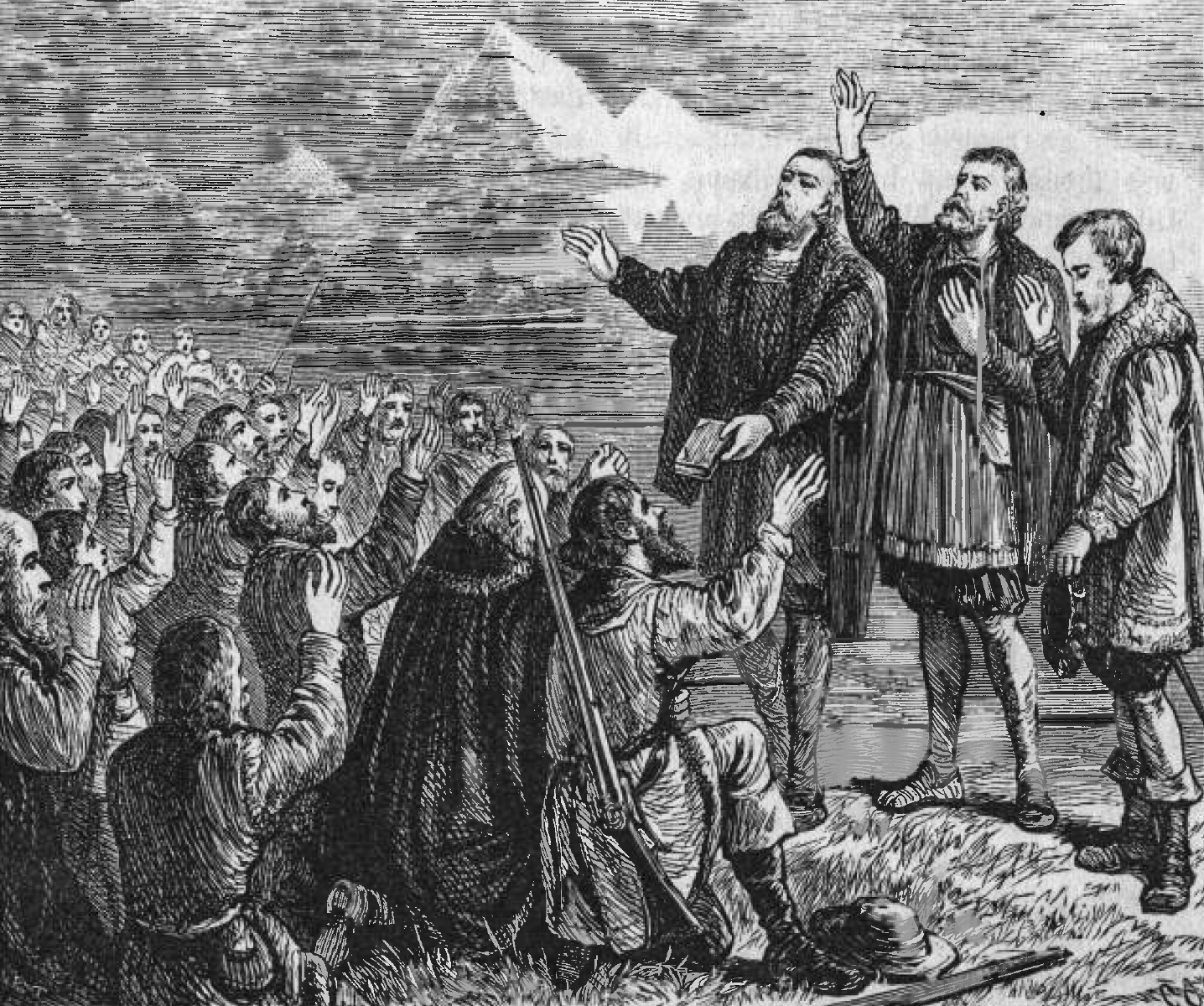
The Vaudois taking their oath. Anonymous illustration published in 1886.

Some Protestants have considered the Waldensians to be the oldest Non-Catholic Christian community in Western and Central Europe, and the oldest Protestant denomination. Early Protestants felt a spiritual kinship to the Waldensians and wrote positively about them. John Milton, for example, wrote in his sonnet "On the Late Massacre in Piedmont" of the 1655 massacre and persecution of the Waldensians.

It was once held that the Waldenses were first taught by Paul the Apostle who visited Spain and then allegedly traveled on to Piedmont. As the Catholic Church indulged in excesses in the time of Constantine (Roman Emperor from 306 to 337) – the account tells – the Waldenses held true to their apostolic faith of poverty and piety. These claims were discounted in the nineteenth century.

There were also other claims that the Waldensians predated Peter Waldo's activities in the late twelfth century. In his A History of the Vaudois Church (1859), Antoine Monastier quotes Bernard, abbot of Foncald, who wrote at the end of the twelfth century that the Waldensians arose during the papacy of Lucius. Monastier takes Bernard to mean Lucius II, in office from 1144 to 1145, and concludes that the Waldenses were active before 1145. Bernard also says that the same Pope Lucius condemned them as heretics, but they were condemned by Pope Lucius III in 1184.

Monastier also says that Eberard de Béthune, writing in 1210 (although Monastier says 1160), claimed that the name Vaudois meant "valley dwellers" or those who "dwell in a vale of sorrow and tears", and was in use before the times of Peter Waldo.

Waldensians feature in the theories of Baptist successionism and Landmarkism concerning an alleged continuous tradition of practices and beliefs from John the Baptist onwards.

Some historical writers suggest Waldensian beliefs came from missionaries from the early church and that their history may have its origins in the apostolic age, though this idea itself stems from Baptist Successionism, an idea that was very popular among some nineteenth-century church historians but has been largely rejected by modern scholars in the field. The Roman Inquisitor Reinerus Sacho, writing c. 1230, held the sect of the Vaudois to be of great antiquity, thus preceding Waldo by centuries. According to some early baptist sources there are also accounts of Paulicians, Petrobusians, and Pasaginians, along with the Waldenses of the Alps, who kept Saturday as the Lord's day. Some Anabaptist and Baptist authors have pointed to the Waldensians as an example of earlier Christians who were not a part of the Catholic Church, and who held beliefs they interpreted to be similar to their own. In the seventeenth to the nineteenth century, Dutch and German Mennonite writers like van Braght, Martyrs Mirror (1660) and Steven Blaupot ten Cate, Geschiedkundig onderzoek (1844), linked Anabaptist origins to the Waldensians. Baptist authors like John L. Waller also linked their origins to the Waldensians. James Aitken Wylie (1808–1890) likewise believed the Waldensians preserved the apostolic faith and its practices during the Middle Ages.

Still later, Seventh-day Adventist Ellen G. White taught that the Waldenses were preservers of biblical truth during the Great Apostasy of the Catholic Church. She claimed the Waldenses kept the seventh-day Sabbath, engaged in widespread missionary activity, and "planted the seeds of the Reformation" in Europe. Despite the claims of that the Waldensians were observant of resting on the Sabbath, Waldensians historians like Emilio Comba, Giorgio Spini, and Gabriel Audisio have stated the confusion is due to either the name of shoes worn by their travelling preachers or of their accusation's of holding Witches' Sabbath, as the inquisitors often charged heretics in general. Though other Waldenses sources do suggest there were groups who kept the sabbath.

Scholar Michael W. Homer links the belief in an ancient origin of the Waldensians to three seventeenth-century pastors, Jean-Paul Perrin of the Reformed Church of France and the Waldensian pastors Pierre Gilles and Jean Léger, who posited that the Waldensians were descendants of Primitive Christianity.

Some authors try to date a Reformation-era Waldensian confession of faith back into the Middle Ages in 1120 to assert their claim of doctrinal antiquity. However, in the current historiography from the Waldensians themselves it is asserted that this confession was drafted in 1531.

Protestant theology in Germany was interested in the doctrinal antiquity and apostolic continuity being expressed by the Waldensian faith. The high independence of the communities, lay preaching, voluntary poverty, and strict adherence to the Bible and its early translation through Peter Waldo have been credited to prove an ancient origin of Protestantism as the true interpretation of the faith. Mere anti-Catholic sentiments and controversies, for example in the Kulturkampf, played a role. Heinrich Gottlieb Kreussler's 1830 History of the Reformation contains a ballade about the fate of the Waldensians and quotes Jean Léger's History of the Waldensians (1750) (authored with Siegmund Jakob Baumgarten, published by Johann Jacob Korn) as proof of an early origin of the Waldensians. The strong German Protestant support for the Waldensian diaspora community in Italy—leading staff of the Gustavus Adolphus Union (GAW) praised them as one of the most interesting churches of all—was not confined to a theological fascination. It led to extensive financial support, loans, exchange of priesters and communities, aid missions and political interventions for the Italian Waldensians and their charitable efforts, starting from the seventeenth century. After World War II, the Evangelical Church in Germany actively contributed to reconciliation efforts with Italy and France based on its relationship with the Waldensian community. The GAW has ongoing links with the Waldensians in Italy.

== Waldensians by region ==
=== Italy ===
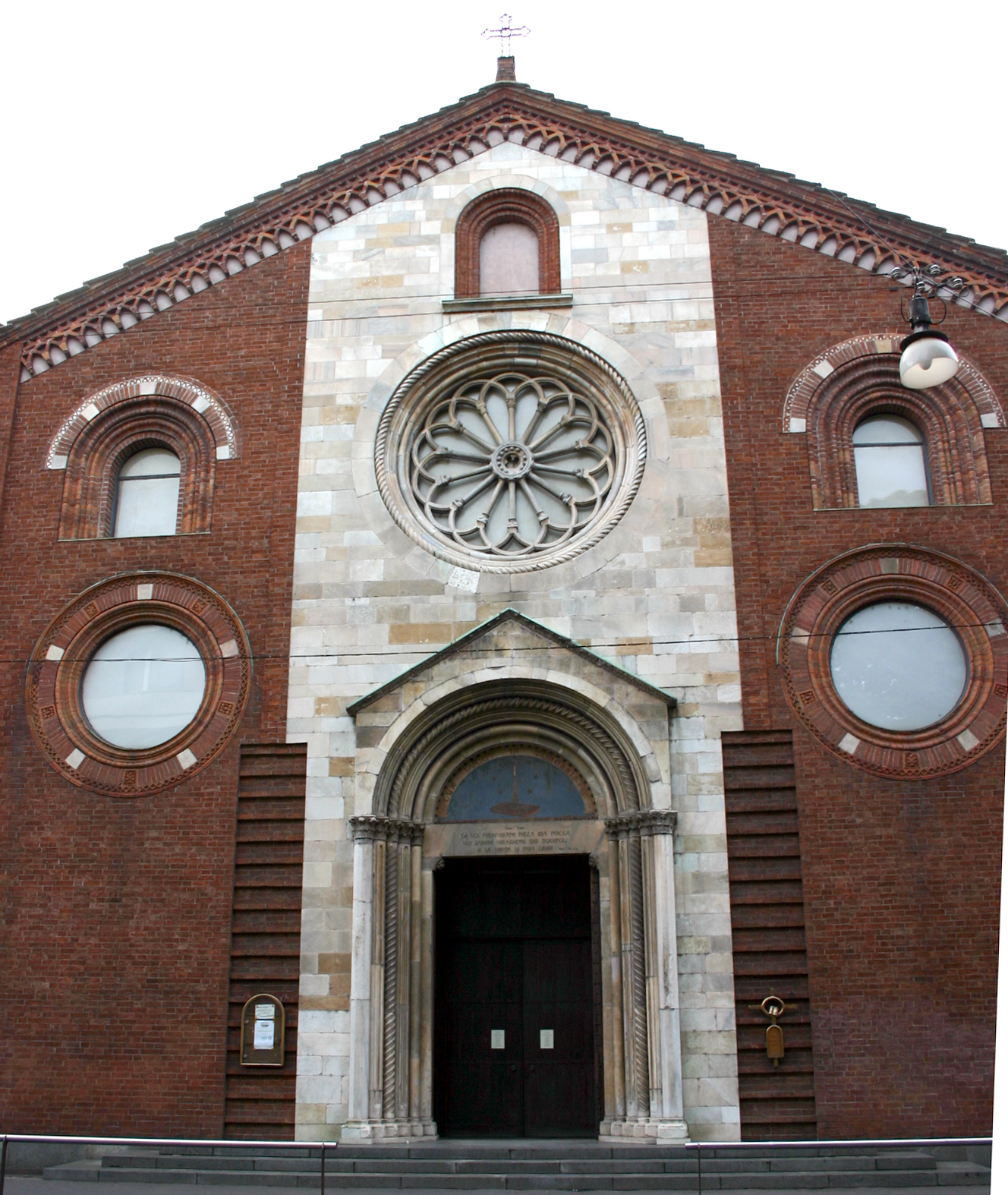
The Waldensian Church in Milan, built in 1949, incorporates materials from the demolished gothic church of San Giovanni in Conca.

In 1848, after many centuries of harsh persecution, the Waldensians acquired legal freedom in the Kingdom of Piedmont-Sardinia as a result of the liberalising reforms which followed Charles Albert of Sardinia's granting a constitution (the Statuto Albertino). Subsequently, the Waldensian Evangelical Church, as it became known, developed and spread through the Italian peninsula.

The Waldensian church was able to gain converts by building schools in some of the poorer regions of Italy, including Sicily. There is still a Waldensian church in the town of Grotte, at the southwest of the island. German Protestants have been supportive of the Waldensians in Italy since the seventeenth century.

During the Nazi occupation of North Italy in the Second World War, Italian Waldensians were active in saving Jews faced with imminent extermination, hiding many of them in the same mountain valley where their own Waldensian ancestors had found refuge in earlier generations.

After 1945, the Evangelical Church in Germany led by Theophil Wurm (who was also Bishop of Württemberg) issued the Stuttgart Declaration of Guilt and actively contributed to reconciliation efforts with Italy (and France) based on relationships with the diaspora. The 1948 centenary festivities of the Savoy civil rights declaration were used for efforts of EKD leading staff to support German Italian reconciliation after World War II. A most fruitful cooperation was established at the community level, with Waldensian delegates from both sides pioneering. 1949, Guglielmo Del Pesco (1889–1951), moderator of the Tavola Valdese (Waldensian round table), was invited back to Maulbronn, celebrating the 250th anniversary of the Waldensian emigration to Germany. He was unable to come for reasons of health but sent A. Jalla, a teacher, described as being full of spite and hatred against all things German after 1945, but who joined in the effort for reconciliation 1949. Based on these experiences, the first town-twinning partnership between Germany and France was signed 1950 between Ludwigsburg and the Protestant exclave Montbéliard, again based on a special connection of the Württemberg Landeskirche. The German Gustavus Adolphus Union is supportive of Waldesian projects and charitable efforts in Italy till the present.

In 1975, the Waldensian Church joined the Methodist Evangelical Church in Italy to form the Union of Waldensian and Methodist Churches. It has 50,000 members (45,000 Waldensians, of whom 30,000 in Italy and some 15,000 divided between Argentina and Uruguay, and 5,000 Methodists).

The eight per thousand tax (Italian: otto per mille) introduced 1985 in Italy greatly helped the Waldensian community. The eight per thousand law allows taxpayers to choose to whom they devolve a compulsory 8 ‰ = 0.8% ('eight per thousand') from their annual income tax return. They may choose an organised religion recognised by Italy or a social assistance scheme run by the Italian State. While the Waldensians have only about 25,000 enlisted members, more than 600,000 Italians are willing to support the Waldensian community and its charitable works. The ordination of women and, since 2010, the blessing of same-sex unions are allowed.

=== South America ===
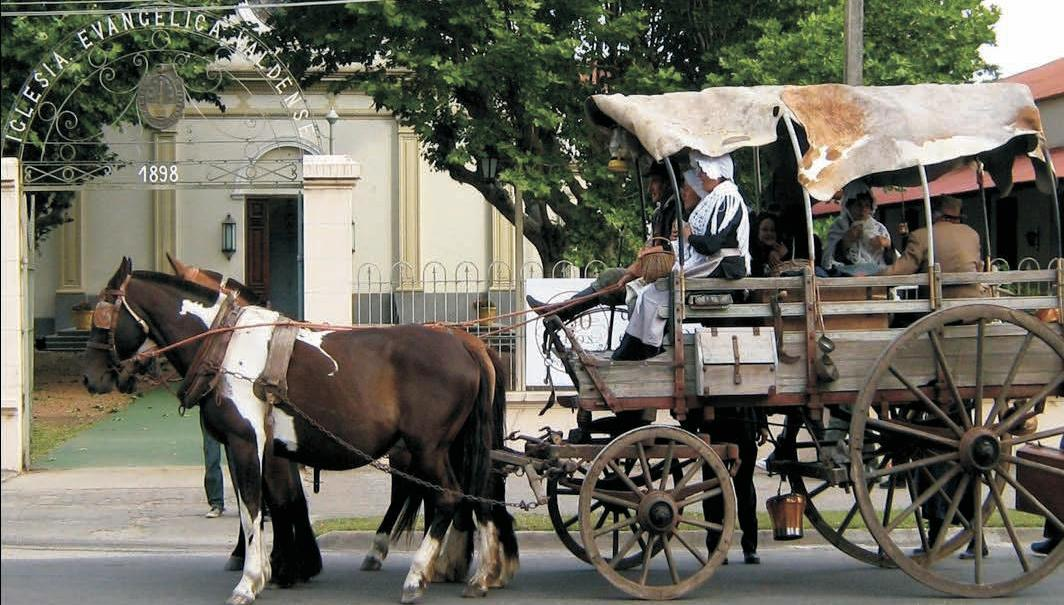
Festivities celebrating the 150th anniversary of Italian immigration to Colonia Valdense, Uruguay.

The first Waldensian settlers from Italy arrived in South America in 1856. From that date there have been several migrations, especially to Argentina, such as the town of Jacinto Aráuz in the southern part of the province of La Pampa, where they arrived around 1901. As of 2016 the Waldensian Church of the Río de La Plata (which forms a united church with the Waldensian Evangelical Church) has approximately 40 congregations and 15,000 members shared between Uruguay and Argentina.

The Uruguayan town of Colonia Valdense, in the department of Colonia, is the administrative center of the Waldensian Evangelical Church of the River Plate. In 1969, the Church established a mission in Barrio Nuevo, which became a soup kitchen for Saturdays and Sundays, for 500 poor families. Missionary activity has led to the conversion of new people without Waldensian ancestry, who are called "new Waldensian".

From Uruguay or directly from Italy, some Waldensian families also found a home in Brazil. There, they ended up joining the local Protestant churches.

=== United States ===
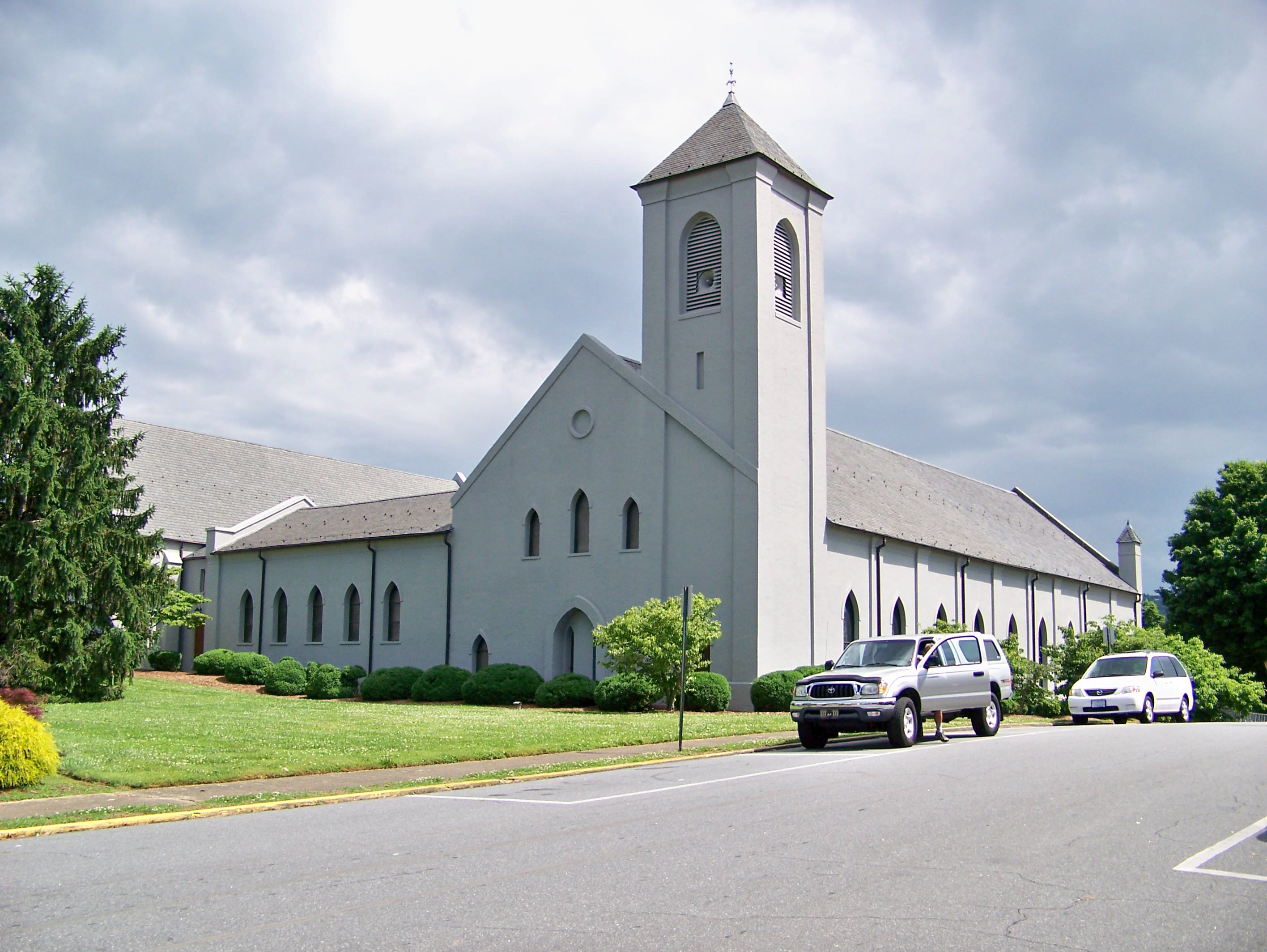
The Waldensian Presbyterian Church in the town of Valdese, North Carolina. This congregation belongs to the Presbyterian Church (USA).

Since colonial times there have been Waldensians who sailed to America, as marked by the presence of them in New Jersey and Delaware. Many Waldensians, having escaped persecution in their homelands by making their way to the tolerant Dutch Republic, crossed the Atlantic to start anew in the New Netherland colony, establishing the first church in North America on Staten Island in 1670.

In the late nineteenth century many Italians, among them Waldensians, emigrated to the United States. They founded communities in New York City; Boston; Chicago; Monett, Missouri; Galveston, Texas; Rochester, New York; Hunter, Utah; and Ogden, Utah. The Monett congregation was among the first to be established in the United States, in 1875, by some 40 settlers who had formed the original South American settlement in Uruguay in the 1850s. With the outbreak of the Uruguayan Civil War they had fled violence in the Uruguayan countryside, traveling first back to Europe then across the Northern Atlantic to New York and by train to southern Missouri. Waldensians living in the Cottian Alps region of Northern Italy continued to migrate to Monett until the early 1900s, augmenting the original colony, and founded another, larger settlement in Valdese, North Carolina, in 1893. The first Waldenses settled in North Carolina in 1893. Both the Monett and Valdese congregations use the name Waldensian Presbyterian Church.

In 1853 a group of approximately 70 Waldensians, including men, women, and children, left their homes in the Piedmont Valleys and migrated to Pleasant Green, Hunter, and Ogden, Utah, after being converted to Mormonism by Lorenzo Snow. These Waldensians maintained their cultural heritage, while passing on their mixture of Mormon and Waldensian faiths to their descendants. Their descendants still consider themselves both Mormon and Waldensian, and have met occasionally over the many decades to celebrate both heritages.

In 1906, through the initiative of church forces in New York City, Waldensian interest groups were invited to coalesce into a new entity, The American Waldensian Aid Society (AWS), organized "to collect funds and apply the same to the aid of the Waldensian Church in Italy and elsewhere ... and to arouse and maintain interest throughout the US in the work of said Church." Today, this organization continues as the American Waldensian Society. The American Waldensian Society recently marked its Centennial with a conference and celebrations in New York City.

By the 1920s most of the Waldensian churches and missions merged into the Presbyterian Church due to the cultural assimilation of the second and third generations.

The work of the American Waldensian Society continues in the United States today. The American Waldensian Society aims to foster dialogue and partnership among Waldensian Churches in Italy and South America and Christian churches within North America in order to promote a compelling vision of Waldensian Christian witness for North America. Thus, the American Waldensian Society makes public the contemporary and historic heritage to which Waldensian spirituality is committed: Tell the Story; Encourage "Crossings"; and Provide Financial Support.

The best known Waldensian Churches in America were in New York, Monett, Missouri and in Valdese, North Carolina. The church in New York City was disbanded by the mid-1990s.

The American Waldensian Society assists churches, organizations and families in the promotion of Waldensian history and culture. The society allies with those who work to preserve their millennial heritage among their descendants. For example, since 1968, the Old Colony Players in Valdese, North Carolina, have staged From This Day Forward, an outdoor drama telling the story of the Waldenses and the founding of Valdese.

The Waldensian Presbyterian churches in the United States and the American Waldensian Society have links with the Italian-based Waldensian Evangelical Church, but, unlike the South American Waldensian communities, today they are independent institutions from the European organization.

=== Germany ===
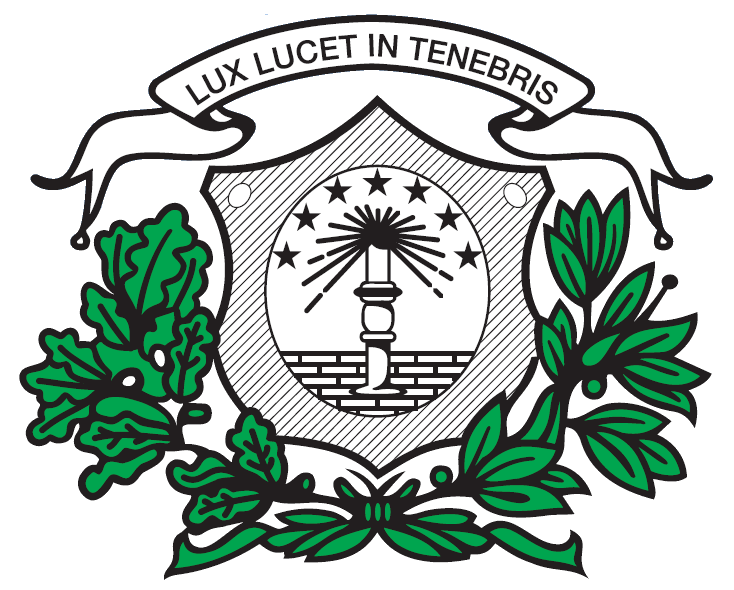
Coat of arms of Le Bourcet (part of Althengstett) in Württemberg

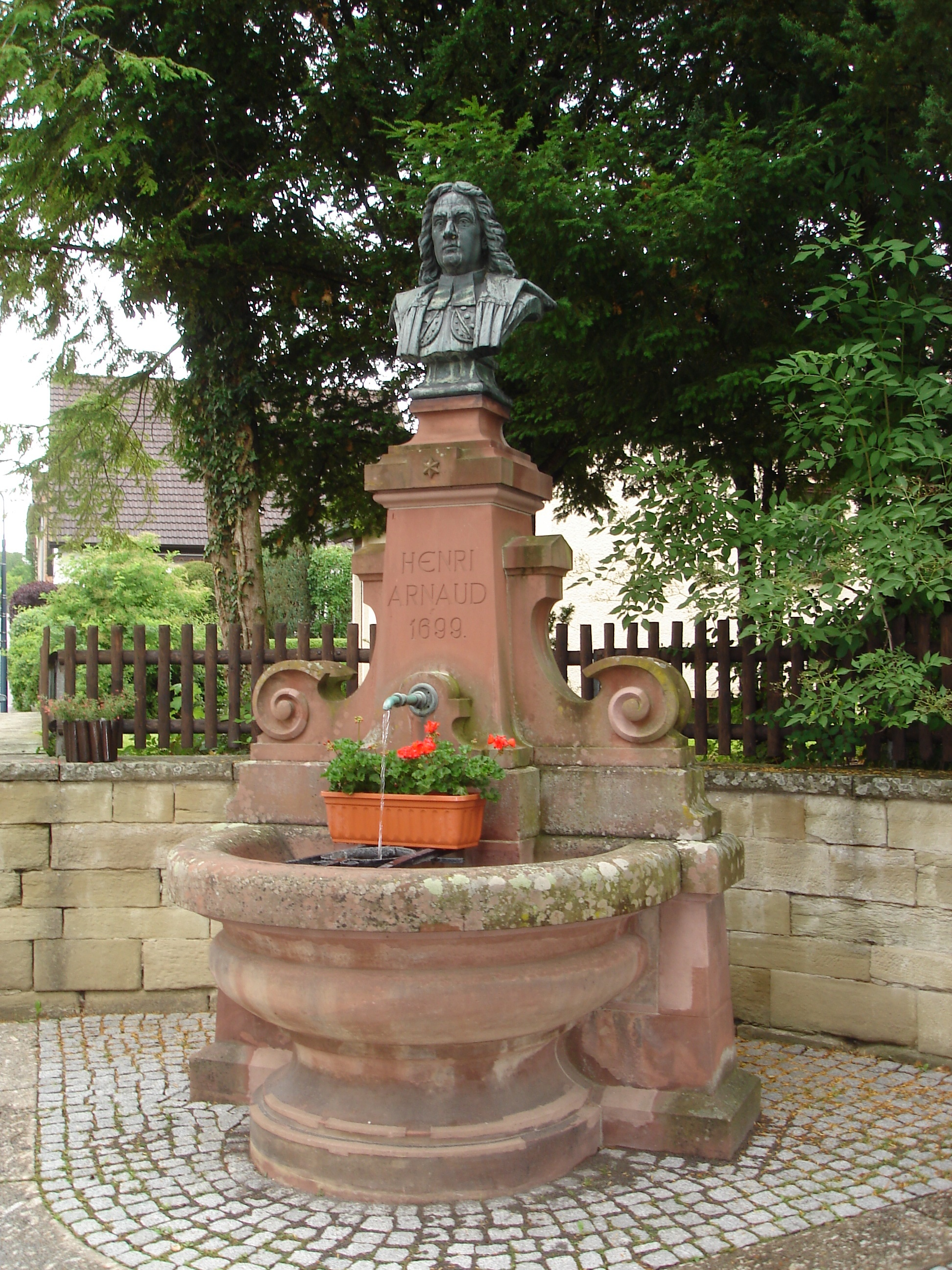
Arnaud's fountain in Perouse (Württemberg)

Several thousand Waldenses fled from Italy and France to Germany. Henri Arnaud (1641–1721), pastor and leader of the Piedmont Waldensians, rescued his co-religionists from their dispersion under the persecution of Victor Amadeus II the Duke of Savoy. Eberhard Louis, Duke of Württemberg invited the Waldensians to his territory. When the Waldensians were exiled a second time, Arnaud accompanied them in their exile to Schönenberg, and continued to act as their pastor until his death.

Those who remained in Germany were soon assimilated by the State Churches (Lutheran and Reformed) and they are a part of various Landeskirchen in the Evangelical Church in Germany. The new settlers were free in their religious services, and kept holding them in French till the nineteenth century. The Waldensian community is often overlooked, as the Huguenots were larger in number. Henri Arnaud's home in Schönenberg close to Ötisheim is a Museum today. A memorial plate refers to the introduction of potatoes in Württemberg by the Waldensians.

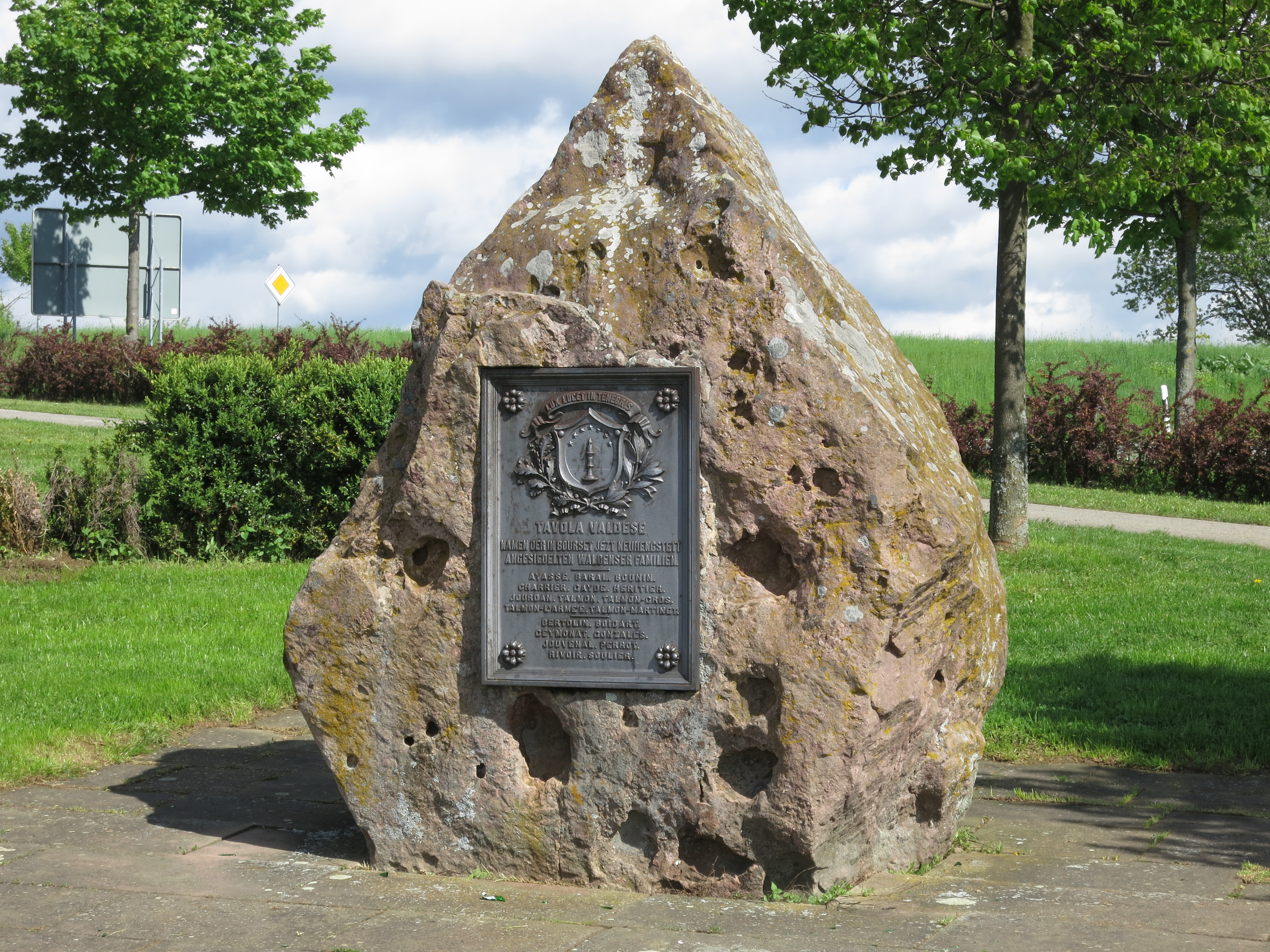
The Waldensian stone was erected north of Le Bourcet (now part of Althengstett) to commemorate the original settler families.

Main parts of the Waldensian refugees found a new home in Hessen-Darmstadt, Kassel, Homburg, Nassau-Dillenburg and in the then Grand Duchée Württemberg. The founded new communities in Rohrbach, Wembach und Hahn (today part of Ober-Ramstadt), Walldorf (today Mörfelden-Walldorf), Bad Homburg-Dornholzhausen, Gottstreu and Gewissenruh (Oberweser), Charlottenberg. Still today, French family names (Gille, Roux, Granget, Conle, Gillardon, Common, Jourdan, Piston, Richardon, Servay, Conte, Baral, Gay, Orcellet or Salen) show the Savoyard background. Stuttgart hosts as well an Italian Waldensian community with about 100 members.

Municipality names like Pinache, Serres (both now part of Wiernsheim), Großvillars (part of Oberderdingen), Kleinvillars, Perouse show the French heritage, the latter communities are close to Maulbronn and its UNESCO world heritage site monastery and school. Maulbronn was the place of the festivities for the 250th anniversary of the Waldensian emigration to Germany, which played as well an important role in German Italian reconciliation after World War II.

The Waldensian community is active and has various associations maintaining the specific heritage and keep relationships with their counterparts in Italy and South America. That includes as well a close watch on the ecumene, with the Waldensian-influenced theologians being more doubtful about a stronger cooperation with the Catholic Church than others.

== See also ==
- Peter Waldo
- Louis du Bussy
- Arnoldists
- Czech reformers Petr Chelčický, Jan Hus, Jerome of Prague and Hussitism
- Durand of Huesca (later re-converted to Catholicism), early Spanish follower of Peter Waldo
- Frederick Henry Snow Pendleton, Anglican protector who worked with the Waldensians in South America
- Henri Arnaud, a Waldensian writer, pastor, and soldier
- List of Italian religious minority politicians
- Lollards
- Proto-Protestantism
- Restorationism
- Waldensian Evangelical Church
- John Charles Beckwith
- Luserna San Giovanni
- Val Pellice
- Waldensian valleys
