= Durand of Huesca =

Spanish theologian (c.1160 – 1224)

Durand of Huesca (c. 1160 – 1224) was a Spanish Waldensian, who converted in 1207 to Catholicism.

Durand had been a disciple of Peter Waldo, who had been excommunicated in 1184. Around the early 1190s, Durand wrote Liber Antihaeresis against the Cathars, which is considered perhaps the best primary source on early Waldensian thought.

In 1207, a religious conference was held between Catholics and Waldenses at Pamiers. Participating in the conference were Bishop Fulk of Toulouse, Bishop Navarrus of Couserans, and mentor of Dominic of Caleruega, Diego de Acebo Bishop of Osma. Shortly thereafter Durand and several other Waldenses returned to the Church. Durand's decision to return to the Catholic Church was based on an interest in defending the sacraments and the Incarnation against what he saw as a dualist heresy.

In 1208, they organized themselves into the religious community of the Poor Catholics for the conversion of Waldenses. Pope Innocent III granted formal approval in 1210 and Durand was elected prior.
