= La nobla leyczon =

La nobla leyczon (Occitan pronunciation: [la ˈnɔpːlɔ lejˈsu], La nòbla leiçon in modern Occitan, "The Noble Lesson") is an anonymous text written in Old Occitan. It is the founding document of the Waldensian creed. Its sixth line, ben ha mil & cent an complí entierament (already eleven hundred years have run their course [since Christ died]), places it in the early 12th century but modern scholars now date it between 1190 and 1240. However, the very same line varies according to which of the four manuscripts is studied: the Geneva and Dublin ones say mil e cen (1100) while the Cambridge ones both state mil e cccc cent (1400). Further discrepancies include various anachronisms and the fact that Old Occitan was not spoken in the Lyon region. The manuscript was found in the Piedmontese valleys.

The 479 lines of the poem can be divided into seven parts according to the themes treated : 1-56 deal with the end of the world; 57-229 retrace the history of the Bible; 230-265 tell of the new law; 266-333 narrate Jesus's life and works; 334-360 praise the faithful Christian Church; 361-413 relate the persecutions and the corrupted lives of papists and 414-479 explain what true repentance is.

== Opening lines ==
AYCÍ COMENCZA LA NOBLA LEYCZON

O frayre, entendé ma nobla leyczon:
Sovent devén velhar e istar en oracion,
Car nos veén aquest mont esser pres del chavon;
Mot curiós deoriàn ésser de bonas obras far,
Car nos veén aquest mont de la fin apropiar.
Ben ha mil & cent ancz complí entierament,
Que fo scripta l'ora, car sen al derier temp.
Poc deoriàn cubitar, car sen al remanent.
Tot jorn veén las ensegnas venir a compliment,
En acreysament de mal e en amermament de ben.
Ayczó son li perilh que l'escriptura di:
L'avangeli ho recoynta, e sant Paul atresí,
Que neún home que viva, non po saber la fin.
Enperczó devén mays temer, car nos non sen certan,
Si la mort nos penré enchoy o deman.

THUS BEGINTH THE NOBLE LESSON

O Brethren, give ear to a noble Lesson,
We ought always to watch and pray,
For we see this world nigh to a conclusion,
We ought to strive to do good works,
Seeing that the end of this world approacheth.
There are already a thousand and one hundred years fully accomplished
Since it was written thus, For we are in the last time.
We ought to covet little, for we are at the latter end.
We see daily the signs to be accomplished
In the increase of evil and the decrease of good.
These are the perils which the Scripture mentioneth
In the Gospels and Saint Paul's writings.
No man living can know the end.
And therefore we ought the more to fear, for we are not certain
Whether we shall die to day or to morrow.
