= Louis du Bussy =

Swiss-born physician and colonial entrepreneur in Suriname

- Born: c. 1714/1715; Piedmont
- Died: after 1750 probably New York
- Occupations: Physician, pharmacist, colonial entrepreneur
- Known for: Organizing Swiss emigration to Suriname
- Spouse: Jeanne Esther Faigaux
- Children: 2

Louis du Bussy (c. 1714/1715 – after 1750) was a Waldensian physician and pharmacist who became a controversial colonial entrepreneur in Suriname. Born in Piedmont, he played a significant role in organizing Swiss emigration to the Dutch colony of Suriname in the mid-18th century, though his efforts ultimately ended in failure and scandal.

== Early life and career ==
The origins and early life of Louis du Bussy remain largely unknown. He was born around 1714 or 1715 in Piedmont and belonged to the Waldensian religious community. Du Bussy married Jeanne Esther Faigaux, and the couple had two children born in 1743 and 1744.

As a trained physician, du Bussy arrived in Paramaribo in 1746 from Switzerland, with his travel expenses covered by the Sociëteit van Suriname, a commercial company supported by the Dutch West India Company, the city of Amsterdam, and private investors.

== Colonial emigration project ==
In November 1747, the Sociëteit van Suriname commissioned du Bussy as an entrepreneur to organize the emigration of ten Swiss families to Suriname for the sum of 2,300 florins. This initiative was part of a broader colonial strategy under Governor Jan Jacob Mauricius, representing the company's final attempt to establish Huguenot and Waldensian settlements from Germany and Switzerland as Protestant refugees in border villages. These settlements were intended to serve as protection against attacks by maroons – escaped slaves who had formed independent communities.

This was not the first such attempt, as similar efforts had been made since the late 17th century. At the end of 1747, du Bussy traveled to Basel where he recruited ten family groups comprising a total of 93 individuals (47 adults, 12 youth, and 34 children) on behalf of the company and the Amsterdam Council. Nine of these groups originated from the Basel-Landschaft countryside, while members of the tenth group came from Bernese Aargau and the County of Baden.

The immigrants were promised land, livestock, food, and for a limited period, enslaved people to help them clear the frontier region of Para in Suriname. The colonial authorities intended for these settlers to develop the borderland areas of the colony.

== Conflicts and downfall ==
From their arrival, the Swiss colonization project faced significant difficulties, particularly due to intense conflicts among colonial leaders. When the Swiss colonists complained about breach of contract, miserable living conditions, and acts of violence committed by du Bussy, some were arrested and their spokesperson, Heinrich Degen from Münchenstein, was imprisoned.

Du Bussy apparently also attracted the displeasure of various plantation owners and the French preacher du Voisin. In 1749, he was charged for his violent behavior and for having an illegitimate child with Esther Bertschi from Läufelfingen, a colonist's daughter who worked as a domestic servant in his house. Banished from the colony, du Bussy left Paramaribo in 1750.

The following year, news spread in the city that he had been shipwrecked off the coast of New England and, having lost a leg, was living as a beggar in New York. After this point, his whereabouts became unknown.

== Fate of the Swiss settlement ==
The Swiss village on the Para frontier, which had already been targeted by raids in the past, was again pillaged in November 1753 by escaped slaves. A month later, the wives of two sick colonists who had been forced to resettle along the road to Rama, built to protect the frontier, appealed to the governor for help, as the occupied lands were sterile and could not sustain them. This represents the last trace of these Swiss immigrants.

The limited information about du Bussy's life and the colonists he recruited comes from Council minutes, court records from the Suriname tribunal, governor reports, parish registers from Biel/Bienne, and emigration files from the State Archives of Basel-Stadt.

== Bibliography ==
- Pijttersen, Hendrik: Europeesche kolonisatie in Suriname. Een geschiedkundige schets, 1896, pp. 25–30.
- Fatah-Black, Karwan: "A Swiss village in the Dutch tropics. The limitations of empire-centred approaches to the early modern Atlantic world", in: BMGN – Low Countries Historical Review, 128/1, 2013, pp. 31–52.
- Neus, Hilde: "Seksualiteit in Suriname. Tegenverhalen over liefde en 'vleselijke conversatie' in een koloniale samenleving", in: Jaerboek de achtiende eeuw, 53, 2021, pp. 173–189.
