= Waldensian Presbyterian Church =

Historic church in North Carolina, United States

- U.S. National Register of Historic Places
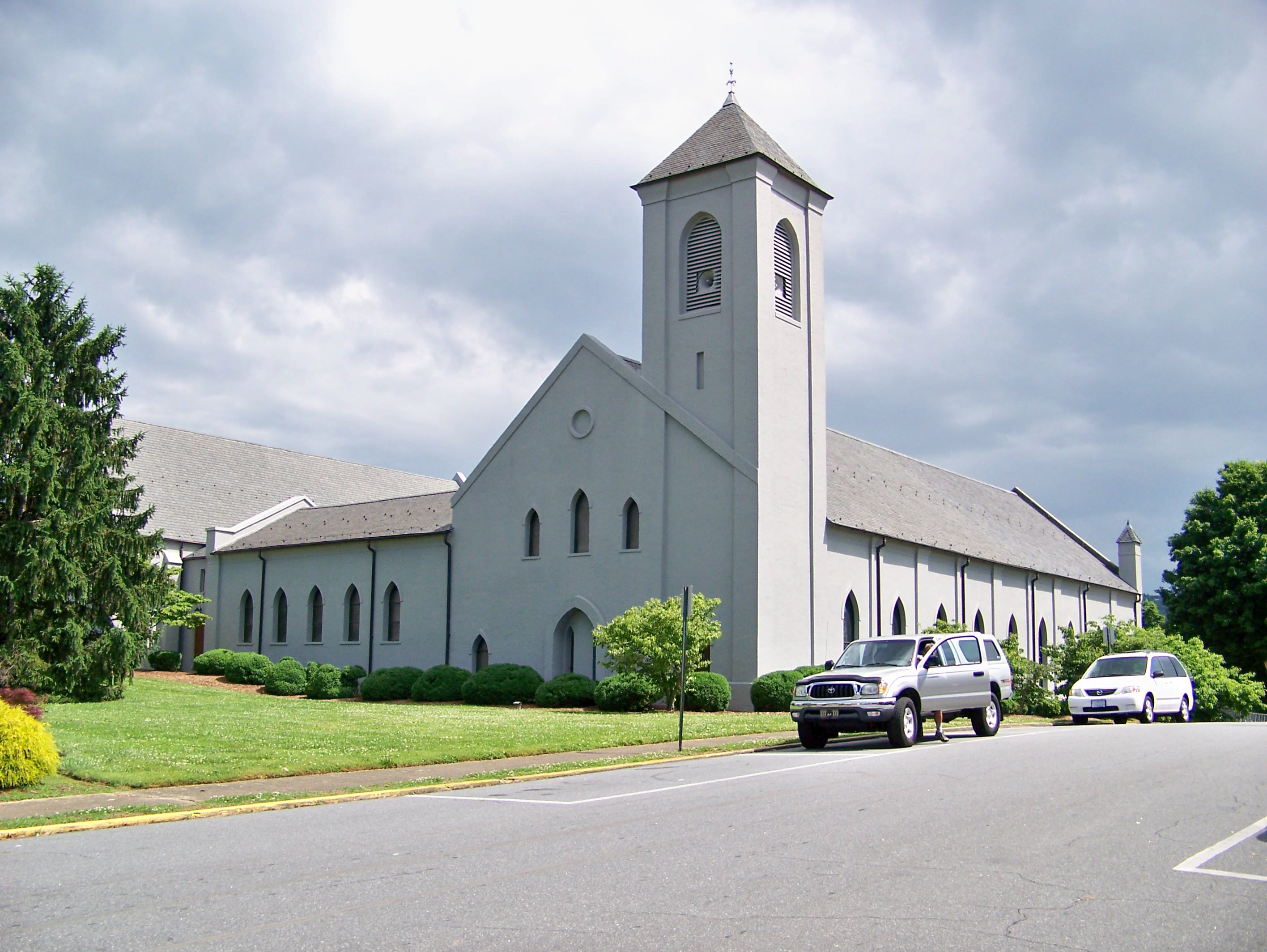
- 2013

- Location within North Carolina Location within the United States
- Location: 109 E. Main St., Valdese, North Carolina
- Coordinates: 35°44′34″N 81°33′45″W
- Area: 2.3 acres (0.93 ha)
- Built: 1896
- Architectural style: Romanesque
- NRHP reference No.: 84000116
- Added to NRHP: October 25, 1984

Waldensian Presbyterian Church is a historic Waldensian church at 104 East Main Street in Valdese, Burke County, North Carolina.

== History ==
In 1893, twenty-nine Waldenses from the Cottian Alps of Italy arrived in Burke County, North Carolina, to pave the way for several hundred other Waldensian immigrants. In 1897, the Waldensians began to construct a Romanesque-style church that would resemble those they left in Italy and France. The building was officially completed in 1899.

It was added to the National Register of Historic Places in 1984. The congregation is a component of the Presbyterian Church (USA).

== See also ==
- Waldensian Church and Cemetery of Stone Prairie
