= On the Late Massacre in Piedmont =

Sonnet by John Milton

On the Late Massacre in Piedmont

Avenge, O Lord, thy slaughtered saints, whose bones
Lie scattered on the Alpine mountains cold,
Even them who kept thy truth so pure of old,
When all our fathers worshiped stocks and stones;
Forget not: in thy book record their groans
Who were thy sheep and in their ancient fold
Slain by the bloody Piedmontese that rolled
Mother with infant down the rocks. Their moans
The vales redoubled to the hills, and they
To Heaven. Their martyred blood and ashes sow
O'er all th' Italian fields where still doth sway
The triple tyrant; that from these may grow
A hundredfold, who having learnt thy way
Early may fly the Babylonian woe.

"On the Late Massacre in Piedmont" is a sonnet by the English poet John Milton inspired by the Easter massacre of Waldensians in Piedmont by the troops of Charles Emmanuel II, Duke of Savoy in April 1655. Also known as Milton’s “Sonnet 18,” “On the Late Massacre at Piedmont” has been described by the famous essayist William Hazlitt as filled with “prophetic fury.”

== History and background ==
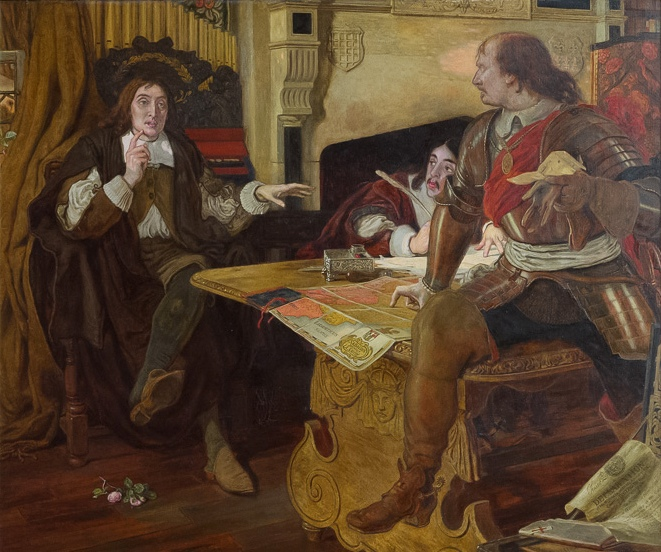
Ford Madox Brown's painting Cromwell, Protector of the Vaudois, depicting Milton (left), Cromwell and Andrew Marvell preparing their response to the massacre

In 1487, shortly after the Crusades in Southern France, Pope Innocent VIII turned his focus to the Waldensians in Northern Italy. The group was excommunicated from the church after refusing to conform to Catholicism. A series of attacks were made on the group before Charles I, Duke of Savoy intervened to bring peace to his lands.

In 1655 Charles Emmanuel II, Duke of Savoy renewed the persecution. He gave them twenty days to sell their lands and leave the town or to attend Catholic mass. When he found out that many of the townspeople had fled, he created a false uprising to send in troops. As part of the ordinance he required the townspeople to shelter the troops in their homes. The quartering order was not required, but was a way to get the troops close to the people without raising suspicion.

On 24 April 1655 there was an order given to begin the attack on the people. It is said that the Catholic forces went beyond reason of attacking the Waldensians. They are reported to have unleashed an unprovoked campaign of looting, rape, torture, and murder. The estimated number of people killed was around 2,000 people killed and another 2,000 were forcibly converted to the Catholic faith. Word of the killings spread quickly throughout Europe and great efforts were made to remove any survivors from the area and bring them to safety. The events of this massacre are what led to the inspiration and writing of John Milton’s sonnet “On the Late Massacre in Piedmont.”

== Form and style ==
Milton’s Sonnet 18 is written in iambic pentameter, with ten syllables per line, and consists of the customary 14 lines. Milton's sonnets do not follow the English (Shakespearean) sonnet form, however, but the original Italian (Petrarchan) form, as did other English poets before him (e.g. Wyatt) and after him (e.g. Elizabeth Browning). This sonnet follows the ABBA, ABBA, CDCDCD rhyme scheme. In the third quatrain this changes and the poem reveals who is behind the massacre: the "Triple Tyrant," a reference to the Pope with his triple crown.

== Themes and motifs ==
The largest theme of the sonnet is religion, though calling on religion to enact justice. The other theme is the movement from Old Testament to the New Testament. The poem compares the theme of vengeance from the Old Testament to the theme of regeneration in the New Testament. The clear example of vengeance in the poem is the first line of “Avenge, O Lord,” which could be a reference to Luke 18:7, a Bible verse that speaks about vengeance, or to Revelation 6:9-10, a verse depicting the souls of martyrs crying out “O Sovereign Lord, holy and true, how long before you will judge and avenge our blood on those who dwell on the earth?”. An example of regeneration is the lines “grow/ A hundredfold” and “Mother with Infant.”

Several symbolic references to the Reformation era Protestant view of the Papacy appear in this poem. In stating "O'er all th' Italian fields where still doth sway/ The triple tyrant", a reference is made to the triple-crown Papal Tiara, which was a symbol of Papal authority, and to the Papal dominance of Italy.

The closing line, referring to "the Babylonian woe", references the figure known as the Whore of Babylon, from Revelation 17, which describes her as being 'drunk on the blood of the saints'; the Reformation era Protestant interpretation of this figure was that the Catholic Church was the Whore of Babylon, which was persecuting the saints.

== See also ==
- 1655 in poetry
