= Jacob Gretser =

German Jesuit writer (1562–1625)

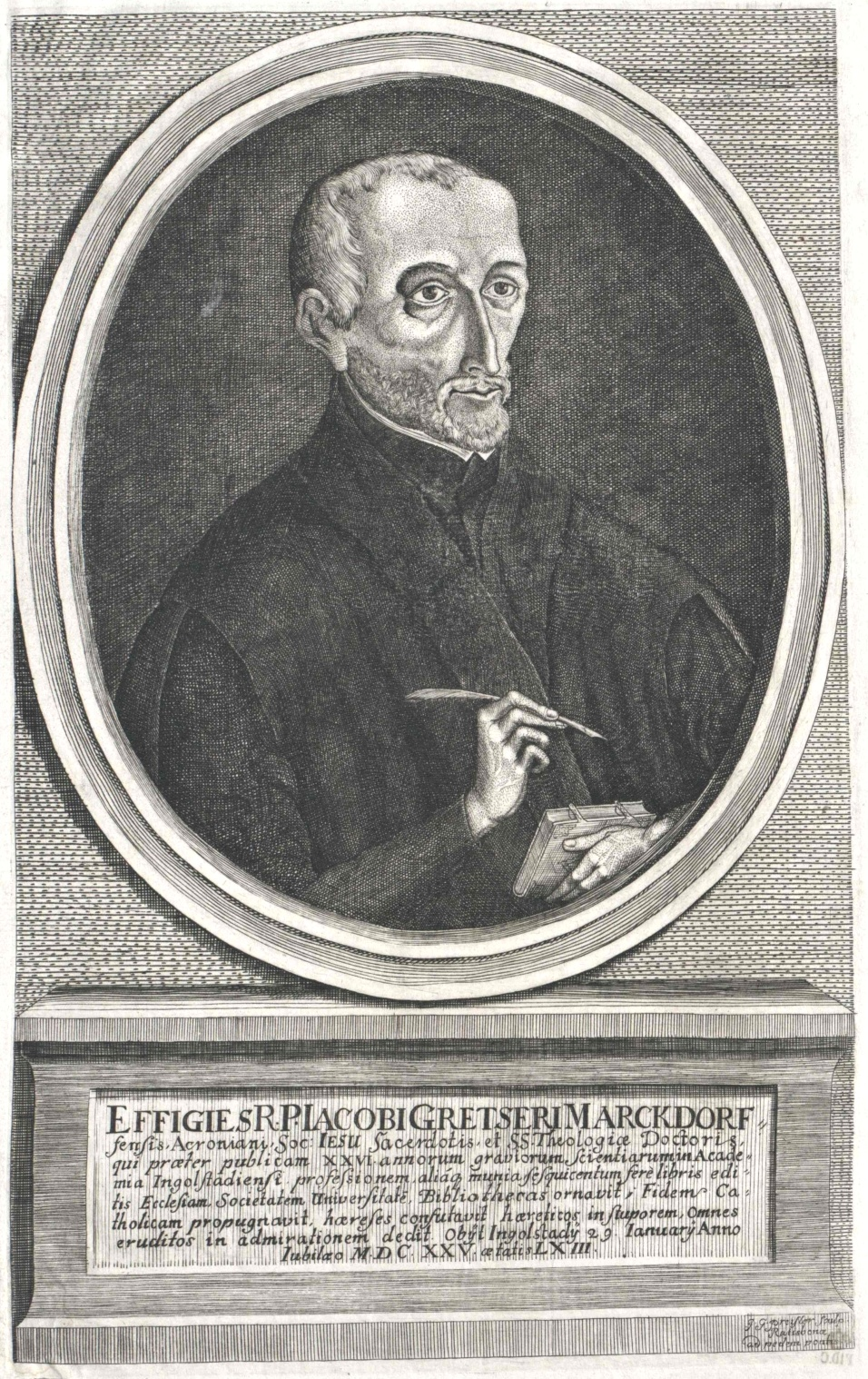
Jacob Gretser

Jacob Gretser (March 27, 1562 – January 29, 1625) was a celebrated German Jesuit writer.

== Life ==
Gretser was born at Markdorf in the Diocese of Constance. He entered the Society of Jesus in 1578, and nine years later he defended publicly theses covering the whole field of theology. Ingolstadt was the principal scene of his work; here he taught philosophy for three years, dogmatic theology for fourteen and moral theology for seven years. He gave at least ten hours a day to his studies, which he protracted, at times, till late into the night, in order to devote part of the day to works of charity and zeal.

He was recognized as one of the best controversialists of his time, and was highly esteemed by Pope Clement VIII, Emperor Ferdinand II, and Maximilian I, Elector of Bavaria. Some of the greatest of his age, such as Cardinal Bellarmine and Markus Welser, corresponded with him and consulted him in their difficulties. He died at Ingolstadt.

== Works ==
He edited or explained many works of the patristic and medieval writers, and composed erudite treatises on most diverse subjects. Carlos Sommervogel enumerates two hundred and twenty-nine titles of printed works and thirty-nine manuscripts attributed to Gretser, but it is convenient to follow the grouping of his writings as they are distributed in the seventeen folios of the complete edition which appeared in Ratisbon (1734–1741).

- Vols. I-III contain archaeological and theological disquisitions concerning the Cross of Christ
- IV-V, a defence of several ecclesiastical feasts and rites
- VI-VII, apologies for several Roman pontiffs
- VIII-IX, a defence of Bellarmine's writings, to which vol. X adds a defence of some lives of the Saints
- XI, a defence of the Society of Jesus
- XII, polemics against the Lutherans and Waldenses
- XIII, polemic miscellanies
- XIV-XV, editions and translations of Greek ecclesiastical writer
- XVI-XVII, philological works

The first volume, for instance, contains five books treating successively of the Cross on which Jesus Christ died, of images of the cross, of apparitions of the Holy Cross, of the sign of the cross, and of the spiritual cross. The second volume gives fifty-seven Graeco-Latin eulogies of the Holy Cross by Greek writers; the third treats of cross-bearing coins, of the Crusades, adding also a defence of both the Crusades and the veneration of the Cross.
