= Diego de Acebo =

Bishop of Osma

Diego de Acebo (also known as Diaz de Osma, Alphonsus Didacus, Didacus Acebes) was bishop of Osma (Castile, Spain) from 1201 to 1207.

== Life ==
Diego de Acebo was prior of the cathedral chapter of the Catedral de Santa María de la Asunción in El Burgo de Osma, where Dominic of Osma became a canon. De Acebo was named Bishop of Osma in 1201. As bishop, he reformed the canonry according to the Rule of St. Augustine.

Accompanied by the future Saint Dominic, Diego travelled ad Marchias Daciae (to Denmark) in 1203 or 1204 to secure a bride for crown prince Ferdinand, son of Alfonso VIII of Castile. They made a second journey in 1204 or 1205 intending to bring the girl back with them, but found that she had meanwhile died. They returned by way of Rome, where Diego unsuccessfully petitioned Pope Innocent III to be entrusted with a mission to the northern pagans. Instead, continuing their journey via Cîteaux, Diego and Dominic began the work of conversion of the Cathars. In 1206 Bishop de Acebo became the unofficial leader of a papal mission to Languedoc, in southern France.

Diego was instrumental in the foundation of Prouille and took part in the early Cathar-Catholic debates at Verfeil, and Montréal, In 1207 he participated in a religious conference with Durand of Huesca and other Waldenses at Pamiers which resulted in Durand and his group returning to the Catholic Church. Soon afterwards Acebo was ordered by the Pope to return to his diocese, where he died on 30 December 1207.

== Bibliography ==
- M.-H. Vicaire, "Une ambassade dans les Marches" in Pierre Mandonnet, Saint Dominique: l'idée, l'homme et l'oeuvre (Paris: Desclée De Brouwer, 1938) vol. 1 pp. 89–98.
