= Reinerius Saccho =

Italian theologian

Reinerius (or Rainerius) Saccho (1200s – c. 1263) was an Italian Dominican inquisitor.

== Biography ==
Saccho was born at Piacenza about the beginning of the thirteenth century; died about 1263. It is generally said that he died in 1258 or 1259, but this is contradicted by the Brief of Urban IV which calls him to Rome on 21 July 1262.

According to Saccho's "Summa contra Waldenses", vi., he was converted by the Cathars at an early age, became one of their bishops, and remained amongst them for seventeen years. He returned to Catholicism (likely influenced by the preaching of St. Peter Martyr), joined the recently established Order of Preachers, then recently established, and proselytized to the Cathars in Upper Italy for many years.

After the martyrdom of St. Peter, Saccho was made inquisitor for Lombardy and Marche. Unpopular among the Cathars, he was eventually exiled.

== Writings ==
Coussord claimed to have discovered an old manuscript of Reinerius, though the text (Paris, 1548) in fact seems to have been a work of Yvonetus; his Tractatus de haeresi pauperum de Lugduno. Flacius also claimed to have, in the Catalogus testium veritatis ("De Waldensibus", Basel, 1556). The "Summa de catharis et leonistis, seu pauperibus de Lugduno" (Martène in Thes. Nov. Anecd. V Paris, 1717) is according to Gieseler the only authentic work ascribed to Reinerius. The work is a description of Cathar sects and doctrines, and was regarded as a great authority during the Middle Ages. The edition of Gretser (Ingolstadt, 1613) is much interpolated, so as (except interceding pages of chapter six) to be more a miscellany on late 13-century heretical factions, collected from various sources by an anonymous German inquisitor in Austria after Reinerius' death.
