= Peter Waldo =

French theologian

- Pierre Vaudès
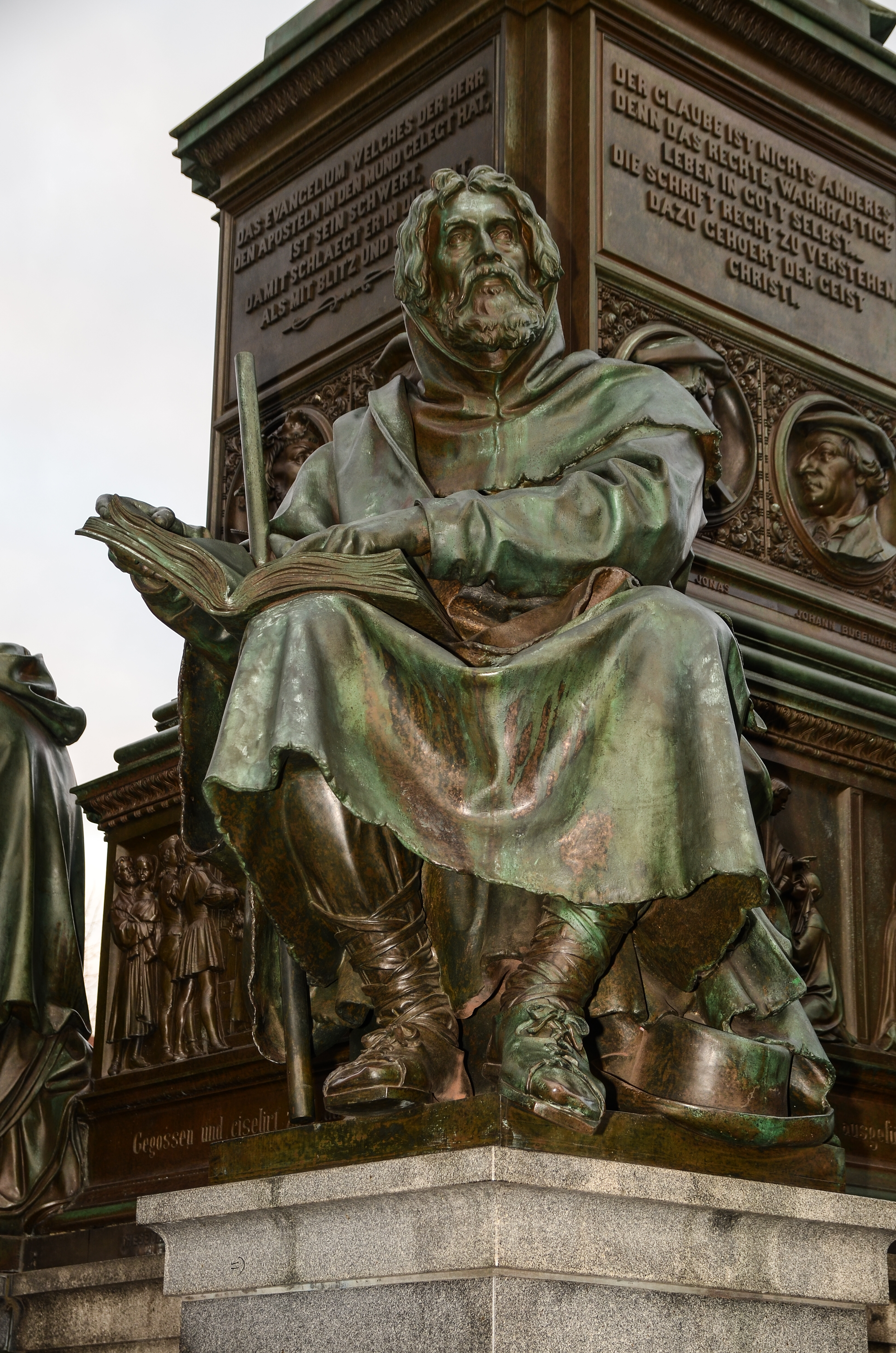
- Statue of Peter Waldo at the Luther Monument in Worms, Germany
- Born: c. 1140; Possibly Lyon, France
- Died: c. 1205 (age about 65); Piedmont, Italy, Holy Roman Empire
- Occupations: Spiritual leader, theologian, merchant
- Theological work
- Tradition or movement: Waldensian

Peter Waldo (/ˈwɔːldoʊ, ˈwɒl-/; also Valdo, Valdes, Waldes; French: Pierre Vaudès, de Vaux; Latin: Petrus Waldus, Valdus; c. 1140 – c. 1205) was a French merchant and later preacher who founded Waldensianism (then called the "Poor of Lyon"), a mendicant ascetic sect which separated from the Roman Catholic Church.

The tradition that his first name was "Peter" can only be traced back to the fourteenth century. This has caused some historians, such as Jana Schulman, to see it as likely a later invention. He is considered a Proto-Protestant.

== Relationship with Waldenses ==
Peter Waldo is regarded by many historians, including Jana Schulman, as having founded the Waldensians sometime between 1170 and 1177.

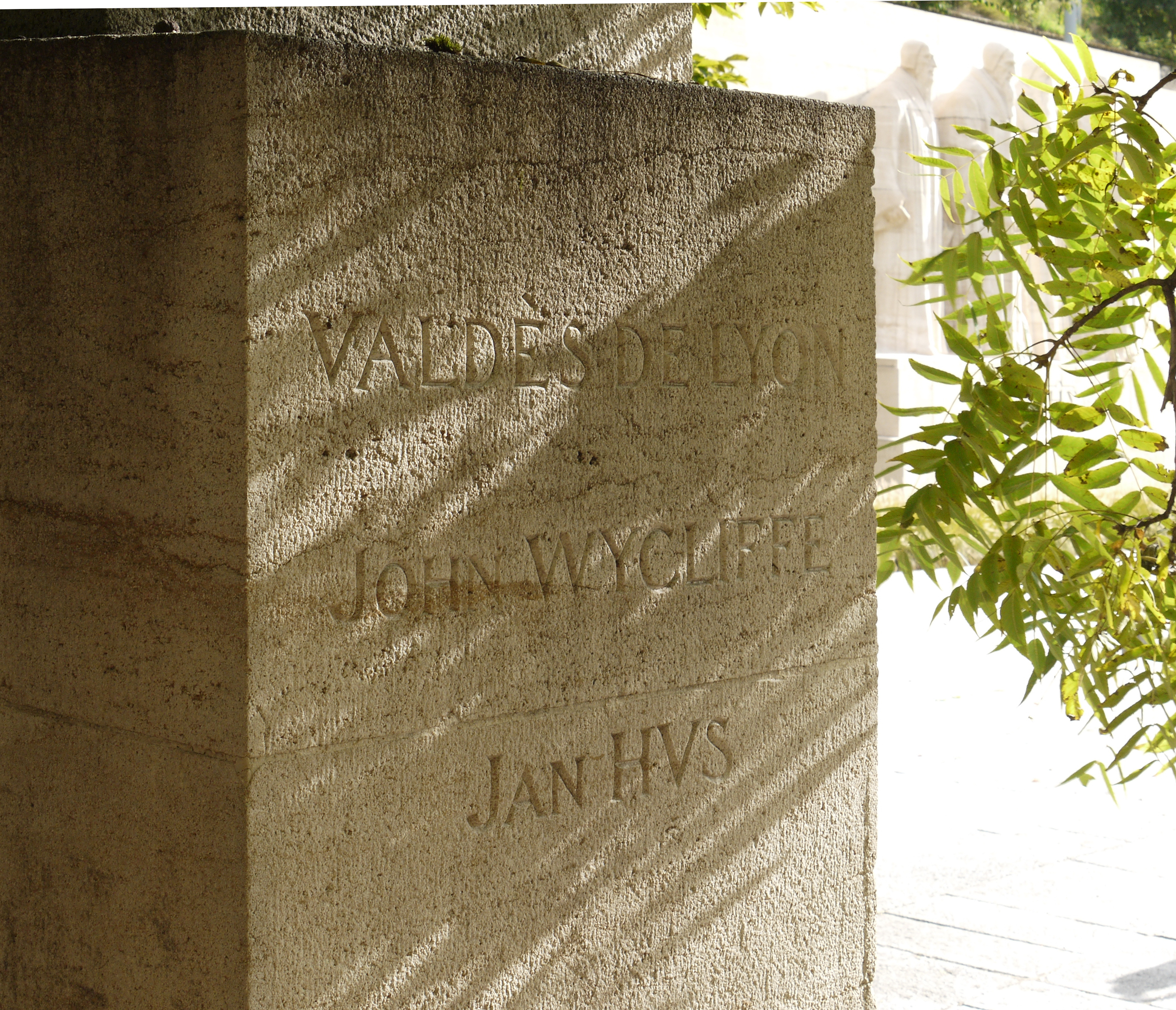
Waldo (as Valdes de Lyon) honoured with John Wycliffe and Jan Hus on the Reformation Wall, Geneva.

There were claims that the Waldensians predated Peter Waldo. In his A History of the Vaudois Church (1859), Antoine Monastier quotes Bernard, Abbott of Foncald, writing at the end of the 12th century, that the Waldensians arose during the papacy of Lucius. Monastier takes him to mean Lucius II, Pope from 1144 to 1145, and concludes that the Waldenses were active before 1145. Bernard also says that the same Pope Lucius condemned them as heretics, but they were condemned by Pope Lucius III in 1184.

Monastier also says that Eberard de Béthune, writing in 1210 (although Monastier says 1160), claimed that the name Vaudois meant "valley dwellers" or those who "dwell in a vale of sorrow and tears", and was in use before Peter Waldo.

A claim persisted until the 19th century that Waldo had not begun any new movement, but that the Waldensian sect had arisen from a pure Christianity established by the Apostles in the Alps soon after Jesus' ascension, and that Waldo was merely perpetuating this pure faith.

== Life and work ==
Most details of Waldo's life are unknown. Extant sources relate that he was a wealthy clothier and merchant from Lyon and a man of some learning. After establishing himself as a successful merchant, Waldo commissioned monks to create a translated copy of the Bible for him. The clerics from Lyon translated the New Testament into the vernacular "Romance" (Franco-Provençal). This has caused Waldo to be credited with providing to Europe the first translation of the Bible in a 'modern tongue' outside of Latin.

Through reading his Bible and writings of the Church Fathers, Waldo became fascinated with the concepts of purity and perfection. He was also influenced by the movement started by Arnold of Brescia.". In 1173 in pursuit of purity, he embraced poverty after hearing an itinerant singer perform a song about Saint Alexius. Alexius had given up a large inheritance and a beautiful bride in order to live in poverty like Jesus. Waldo sold all he had, forswore his marriage and home, and put his two young daughters into a convent.

Waldo began travelling around Lombardy begging and preaching about the value of poverty. The region of Lombardy was a hotbed of religious reform movements at the time, many of which would be later deemed heresies by the Catholic Church. These include the Cathars, the Humiliati, the Albigensians, and the Speronists. As Waldo gathered followers and they determined their own doctrines they shared many features with these other reform movements - to the point that it becomes difficult for historians to determine the origins of many of the religious ideas circulating among them. Unlike the leaders of these other groups Waldo had never joined the Catholic Church's priesthood or any of its religious orders.

Other events, besides hearing of Saint Alexius, may have also contributed to Waldo's decision to take up poverty and preaching including a rejection of transubstantiation when it was considered a capital crime to do it, and the sudden and unexpected death of a friend during an evening meal. From this point onward he began living a radical Christian life, giving his property over to his wife, while the remainder of his belongings he distributed as alms to the poor. At about this time, Waldo began to preach and teach publicly, based on his ideas of simplicity and poverty, notably that "No man can serve two masters, God and Mammon."

Inspired by his example Waldo began to attract followers and they grew into a community of believers. By 1170 Waldo had gathered a large number of followers, referred to as the Poor of Lyons, the Poor of Lombardy, or the Poor of God. They evangelized their teaching while travelling as peddlers. Often referred to as the Waldensians (or Waldenses), they were distinct from the Albigensians or Cathari. The Waldensian movement was characterized from the beginning by lay preaching, voluntary poverty, and strict adherence to the Bible.

In January 1179, Waldo and one of his disciples went to Rome, where they were welcomed by Pope Alexander III and the Roman Curia. They had to explain their faith before a panel of three clergymen, including issues which were then debated within the Church, such as the universal priesthood, the gospel in the vulgate or local language, and the issue of voluntary poverty. The results of the meeting were inconclusive. The pope affirmed the Waldensians' vow of poverty, but forbade them to continue preaching due to their status as laypeople. Waldo and his followers revolted against the ban and increased their preaching and missionary efforts. They continued to gather followers and began proclaiming doctrines at odds with Catholicism - such as the right of all worthy members including women to preach the Scriptures without permission from Church authorities.

=== Excommunication ===
They also began preaching against Purgatory, prayers for the dead, and indulgences. They were excommunicated by the Catholic Church. By the late 1180s, they were being pursued as heretics. This persecution only increased their preaching against the Roman Catholic Church. The Waldensians developed a doctrine that forbids the use of weapons or of oaths, which led them to refuse any participation in Catholic rituals. The Catholic hierarchy accused them of apostasy.

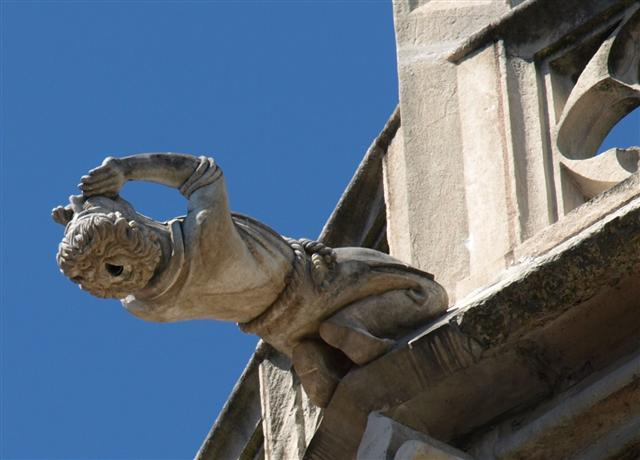
Waldo depicted as a gargoyle on Lyon Cathedral: he is depicted with a hollow head, like a madman, preaching towards the sky, instead of prostrating himself before God.

Waldo condemned what he considered as papal excesses and Catholic dogmas, including purgatory and transubstantiation. He said that these dogmas were "the harlot" from the book of Revelation.

Waldo's ideas, but not the movement itself, were condemned at the Third Lateran Council in March of the same year. The leaders of the Waldensian movement were not yet excommunicated.

In 1180, Waldo composed a profession of faith which is still extant.

Driven away from Lyon, Waldo and his followers settled in the high valleys of Piedmont, and in France, in the Luberon, as they continued in their pursuit of Christianity based on the New Testament. Finally, Waldo was excommunicated by Pope Lucius III during the synod held at Verona in 1184. The doctrine of the Poor of Lyons was again condemned by the Fourth Lateran Council in 1215, when they mentioned the group by name for the first time, and declared its principles to be heresy. Fearing suppression from the Church, Waldo's followers fled to the mountainous regions of northern Italy in the Waldensian Evangelical Church.

== See also ==
- Waldensians
- Waldensian Evangelical Church
- John Charles Beckwith
- Luserna San Giovanni
- Val Pellice
- Waldensian valleys

== Sources ==
=== Primary ===
- Anonymous (January 1996) [1218]. "The Conversion of Peter Waldo". In Halsall, Paul (ed.). Internet Medieval Source Book.
- Waldo, Peter (1969) [1180]. "Profession of Faith". Wikispaces.com. Translated by Wakefield, Walter; Evans, Austin. Archived from the original on 14 July 2020.
- "Ex Chronico Canonici Laudunensis". Recueil des Historiens des Gaules et de la France (in Latin). Vol. XIII. Paris. 1786.
- Map, Walter (1924) [after 1192]. "Of the Sect of the Waldenses". De Nugis Curialium. Translated by Tupper, Frederick; Bladen Ogle, Marbury.

=== Secondary ===
- Aston, M. (1993). Faith and Fire: Popular and Unpopular Religion, 1350–1600. London: Bloomsbury Academic. ISBN 978-1-85285-073-9.
- Beard, C. (1885) [1883]. "Reform before the Reformation". The Reformation of the sixteenth century in its relation to modern thought and knowledge. The Hibbert Lectures. London: Williams and Norgate. p. 24.
- Cathcart, W. (1883). "Waldenses, The". The Baptist Encyclopædia: A Dictionary of the Doctrines, Ordinances, Usages, Confessions of Faith, Sufferings, Labors, and Successes, and of the General History of the Baptist Denomination in All Lands. Vol. 2. Philadelphia, PA: Louis H. Everts. pp. 1200–1201.
- Lelong, Jacques (1723). "Biblia Gallica: Versiones antiquae et codices manuscripti". Bibliotheca Sacra (in Latin). Vol. I. Paris: François Montalant.
- Jones, W. (1819). The History of the Christian Church from the Birth of Christ to the Eighteenth Century. Vol. II. London: W. Myers.
- Monastier, Antoine (1859). A History of the Vaudois Church from Its Origin. London: Religious Tract Society. "Bernard."
- Perrin, J.P. (1884). History of the Old Waldenses Anterior to the Reformation. New York, NY: Macon & Company.
- Roe, E.T.; Hooker, L.R.; Handford, T.W. (1907). "Waldenses". The New American Encyclopedic Dictionary. New York, NY: J. A. Hill.
- Tourn, G. (1980). The Waldensians: The first 800 years (1174–1974). Torino: Claudiana.
- Wylie, J.A. (1848). History of the Waldenses. London: Cassell, limited.
