= Clark Moulton Avery =

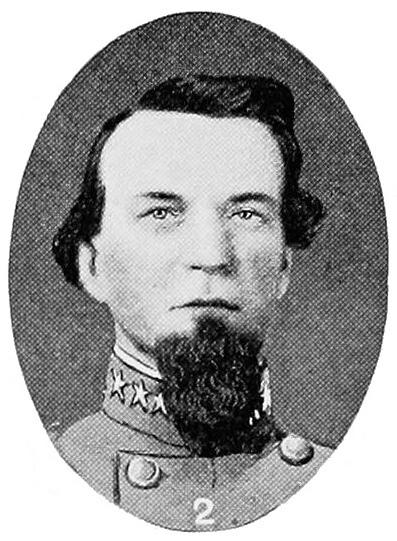
- Born: October 3, 1819; Swan Ponds, North Carolina, US
- Died: June 18, 1864 (aged 44); Spotsylvania County, Virginia
- Military career
- Allegiance: Confederate States
- Branch: Confederate States Army
- Rank: Colonel
- Battles: American Civil War; Battle of Big Bethel; Battle of New Bern (POW); Battle of Chancellorsville; Battle of Gettysburg; Battle of the Wilderness (DOW)

Clark Moulton Avery (October 3, 1819 – June 18, 1864) was a North Carolinian officer in the Confederate States Army who rose to the rank of colonel and died of wounds received while leading the 33rd North Carolina Infantry Regiment at the Battle of the Wilderness during the American Civil War.

== Early life ==
Clark Moulton Avery, second child of Isaac Thomas and Harriet Erwin Avery, was born on October 3, 1819, at Swan Ponds, North Carolina. He graduated at the University of North Carolina in 1838.

== Civil War ==
He was captain of a company in the 1st North Carolina Regiment in the battle at Bethel; lieutenant-colonel of the 33rd North Carolina Regiment; became its colonel early in 1862; was in the battles of Chancellorsville and of Gettysburg; was captured at New Bern by the Federal forces and kept a prisoner on Johnson's Island, Ohio, for several months. He was wounded at the Battle of the Wilderness and died of his injuries on June 18, 1864.

== Personal life ==
He married, on June 23, 1841, at Morganton, North Carolina, Elizabeth Tilghman Walton, daughter of Thomas and Martha (McEntire) Walton. She was born on January 3, 1823, at Morganton. She died on October 25, 1882, near Morganton.

== See also ==
- Isaac E. Avery (brother)
- William Waightstill Avery (brother)
- Alphonso Calhoun Avery (brother)
- Waightstill Avery (grandfather)

== Sources ==
- Avery, Isaac Thomas, Jr. (1979). "Avery, Clark Moulton". Powell, William S. (ed.). Dictionary of North Carolina Biography. Vol. 1. Chapel Hill: The University of North Carolina Press. pp. 67–68.

Attribution:

- Avery, Elroy McKendree; Avery (Tilden), Catharine Hitchcock (1912). The Groton Avery Clan. Vol. 1. Cleveland, OH: [Publisher unknown]. p. 616.
