= Gladys Avery Tillett =

American political organizer and activist

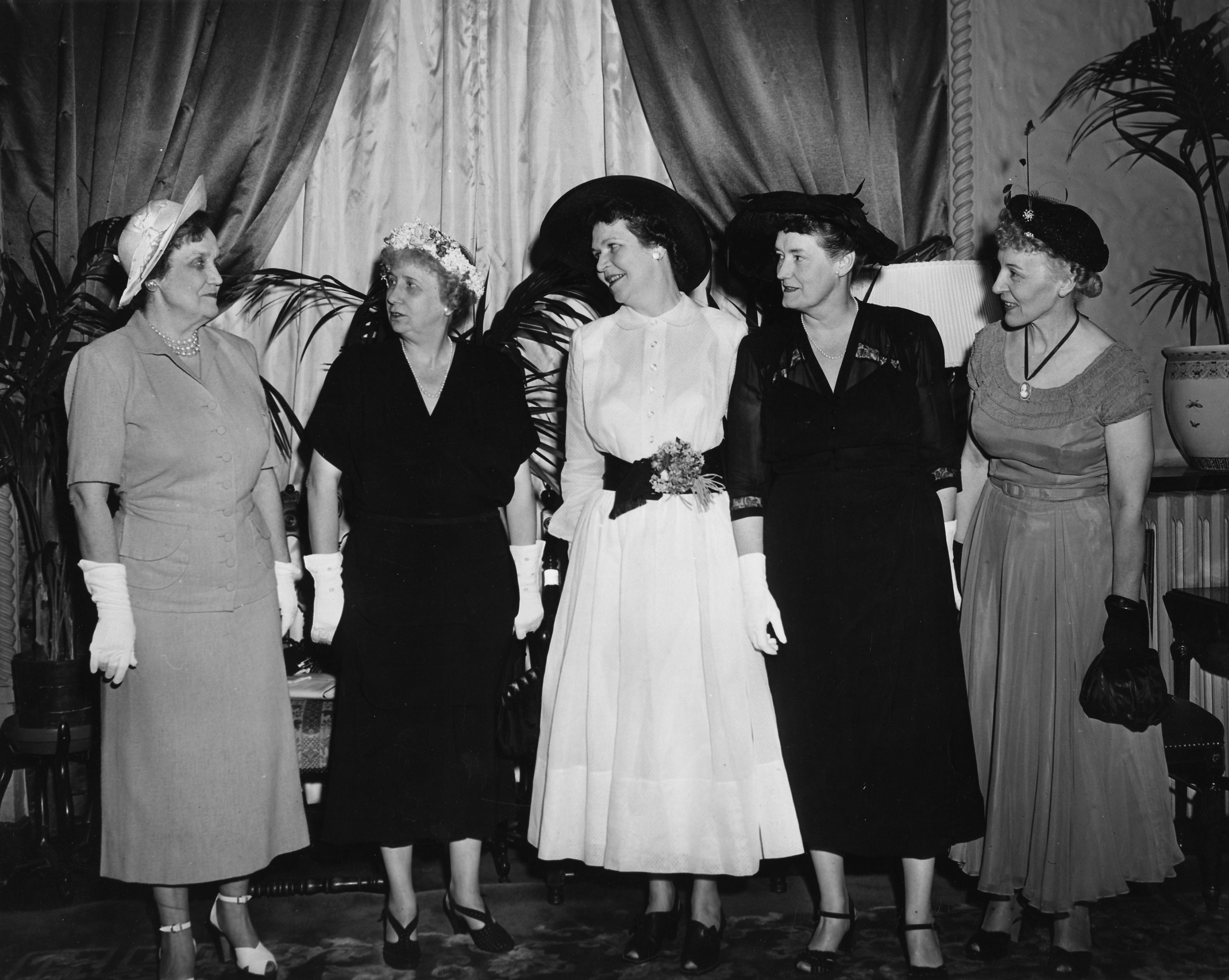
- Gladys Avery Tillett, first from the right, with Bess Truman and various women Democratic Party leaders, ca. 1950.
- Born: Gladys Love Avery; March 19, 1891; Morganton, North Carolina, U.S.
- Died: September 21, 1984 (aged 93)
- Education: North Carolina College for Women
- Alma mater: University of North Carolina
- Known for: US representative on the United Nations Commission on the Status of Women
- Political party: Democratic
- Spouse: Charles Walter Tillett Jr.

Gladys Love Avery Tillett (March 19, 1891 – September 21, 1984) was an American political organizer and activist, based in North Carolina. She supported women's suffrage when she was a college student, and was working for passage of the Equal Rights Amendment in her eighties.

== Early life ==
Gladys Love Avery was born in Morganton, North Carolina, the daughter of Alphonso Calhoun Avery and his second wife, Sarah Love Thomas Avery. Her father, a judge, had served as an officer in the Confederate army during the American Civil War, and in the North Carolina legislature after the war. Her uncle Isaac E. Avery died at the Battle of Gettysburg; two other uncles, William Waightstill Avery and Clark Moulton Avery, also died during the war. One of her grandfathers was William Holland Thomas, and one of her great-grandfathers was Waightstill Avery.

Gladys Avery attended the North Carolina College for Women, where suffragist Harriet Elliott was one of her professors, and earned a bachelor's degree in political science from the University of North Carolina in 1917.

== Career ==
As a young lawyer's wife, Gladys Avery Tillett was active in the Charlotte, North Carolina YWCA, amateur theatre groups, and other women's clubs. She founded the Mecklenburg County chapter of the League of Women Voters, was the president of the League in North Carolina, and served on the State Board of Elections. She also fought for teachers' right to teach evolution.

She was busy on the national level with Democratic Party political work too. In 1936 and 1940 she directed the speakers' bureau of the Women's Division of the Democratic National Committee. In 1943 she became a vice chairman of the Democratic National Committee. She gave a keynote address at the convention in 1944. Late in life she was active working for passage of the Equal Rights Amendment.

Tillett also took an interest in international matters. In 1945 she was an observer at the founding conference of the United Nations. In 1949 she was appointed by Harry S. Truman to the American delegation attending a UNESCO conference in Paris, and in the 1960s she was appointed by presidents Kennedy and Johnson to be the US representative on the United Nations Commission on the Status of Women. "You must awaken the women in order to awaken a country and have it move forward," she explained of her work.

== Personal life ==
Gladys Avery married Charles Walter Tillett Jr., a lawyer from Charlotte, in 1917. They had three children, Charles, Gladys, and Sara. Gladys Avery Tillett died in 1984, aged 92 years, in Charlotte. Her papers are archived in the Southern Historical Collection at the University of North Carolina in Chapel Hill.
