= Alphonse Calhoun Avery House =

Historic house in North Carolina, United States

- U.S. National Register of Historic Places
- U.S. Historic district – Contributing property
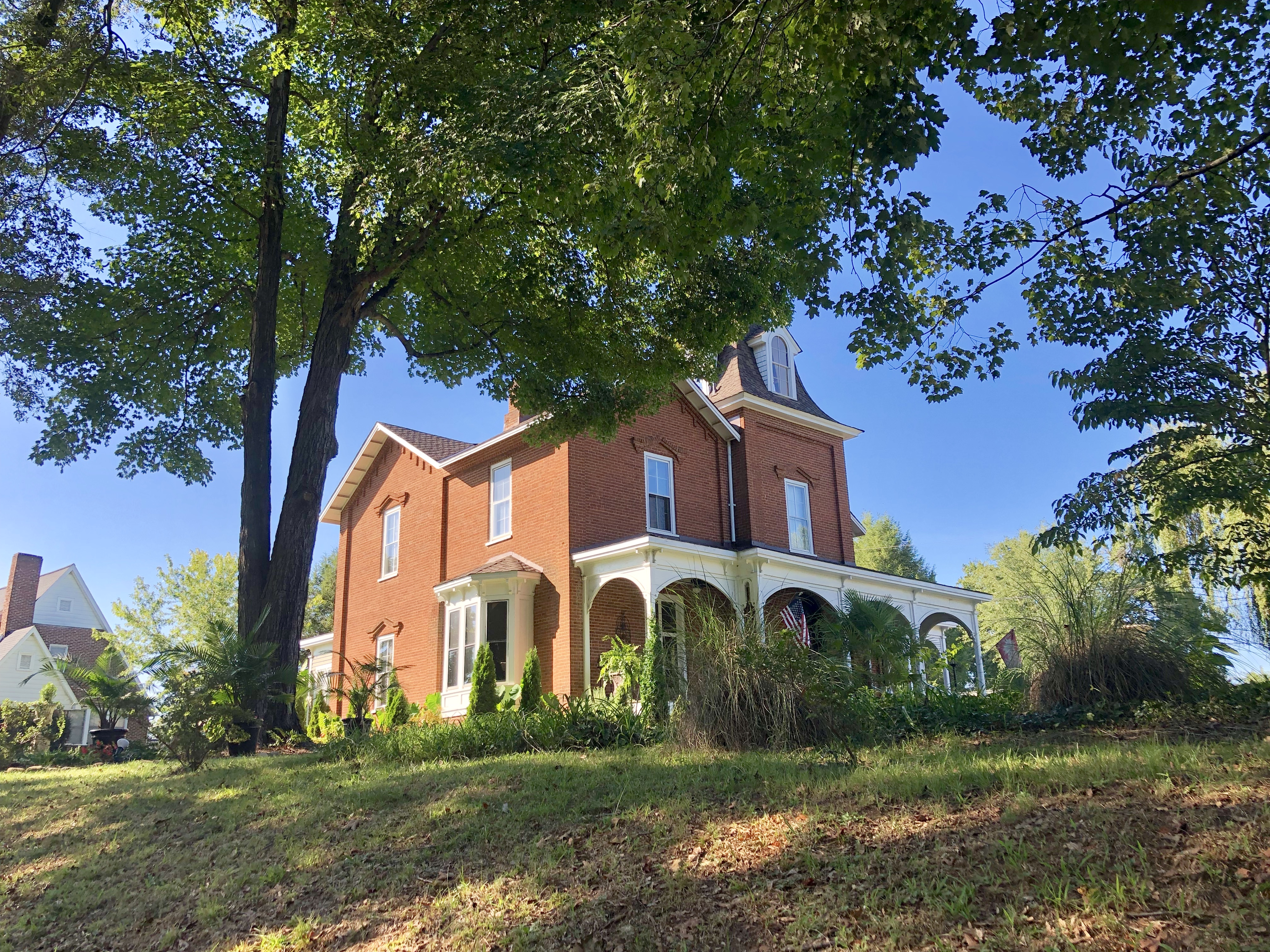
- Alphonse Calhoun Avery House, August 2019

- Location within North Carolina Location within the United States
- Location: 408 N. Green St., Morganton, North Carolina
- Coordinates: 35°44′53″N 81°41′36″W
- Area: 0.5 acres (0.20 ha)
- Built: c. 1876
- Architectural style: Late Victorian
- NRHP reference No.: 84001947
- Added to NRHP: July 12, 1984

Alphonse Calhoun Avery House, also known as the Avery-Surnrnersette House, is a historic home located at Morganton, Burke County, North Carolina. It was built about 1876, and is a two-story, U-shaped, Late Victorian style brick house. It features a 2 1/2-story, squarish, brick tower topped by a mansard roof.

Alphonso Calhoun Avery was born at Swan Ponds in 1835, the fifth son of Isaac Thomas Avery (1785-1864). Avery had a notable legal, military and political careers highlighted by an eight-year term as an associate justice of the North Carolina Supreme Court.

It was listed on the National Register of Historic Places in 1984. It is located in the North Green Street-Bouchelle Street Historic District.
