= North Green Street–Bouchelle Street Historic District =

Historic district in North Carolina, United States

- U.S. National Register of Historic Places
- U.S. Historic district
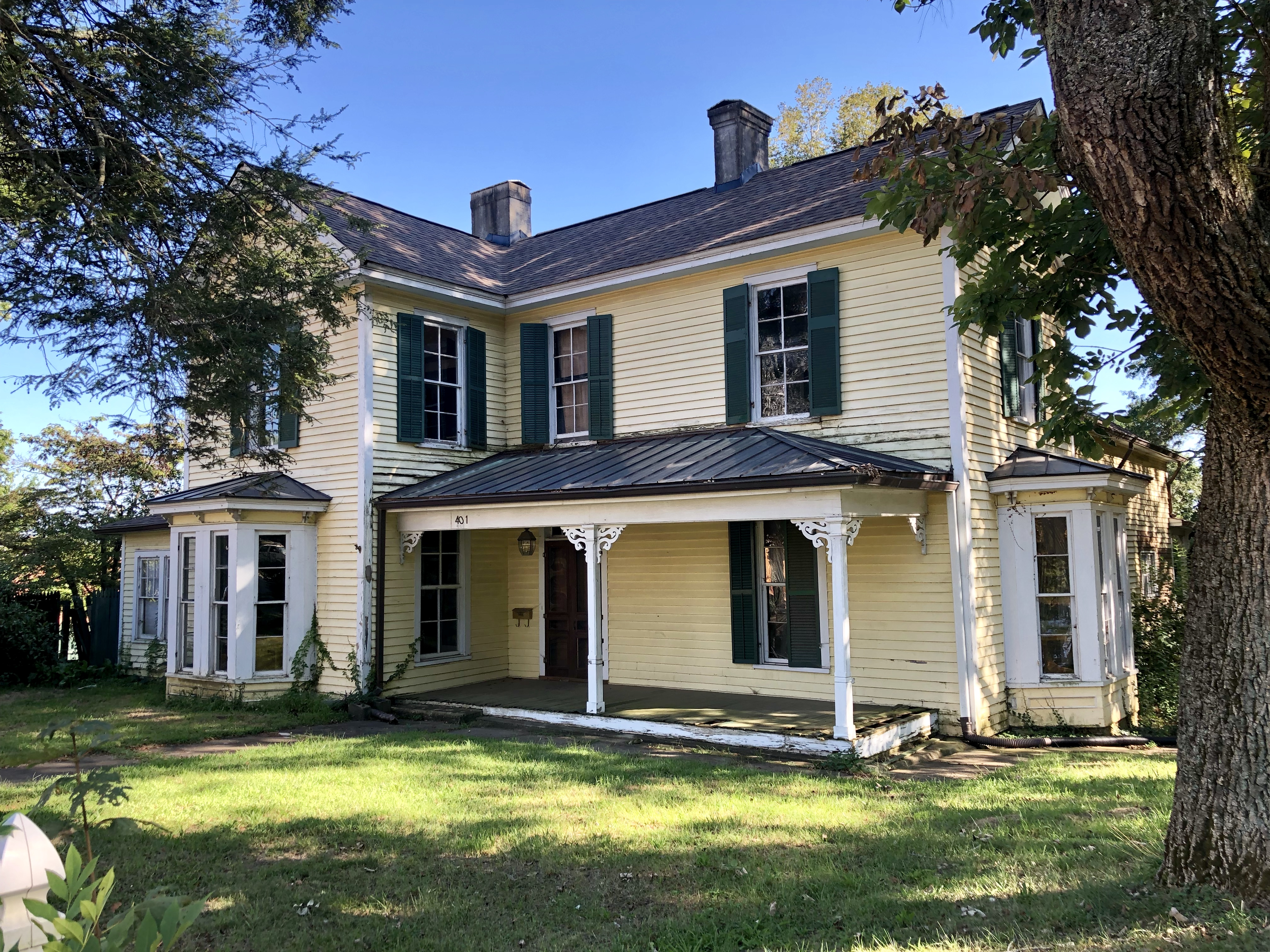
- Contributing Structure on North Green Street

- Location within North Carolina Location within the United States
- Location: N. Green, Bouchelle, & Patterson Sts., Morganton, North Carolina
- Coordinates: 35°44′55″N 81°41′31″W
- Area: 21 acres (8.5 ha)
- Architectural style: Colonial Revival, Bungalow/craftsman, Late Victorian
- MPS: Morganton MRA
- NRHP reference No.: 87001926
- Added to NRHP: November 9, 1987

North Green Street–Bouchelle Street Historic District is a national historic district located at Morganton, Burke County, North Carolina. It encompasses 37 contributing buildings in a predominantly residential section of Morganton. It includes buildings built between about 1876 and 1935, and includes representative examples of Colonial Revival, Bungalow / American Craftsman, and Late Victorian style architecture. Located in the district is the separately listed Alphonse Calhoun Avery House.

It was listed on the National Register of Historic Places in 1987.
