= Magnolia Place =

Historic house in North Carolina, United States

- U.S. National Register of Historic Places
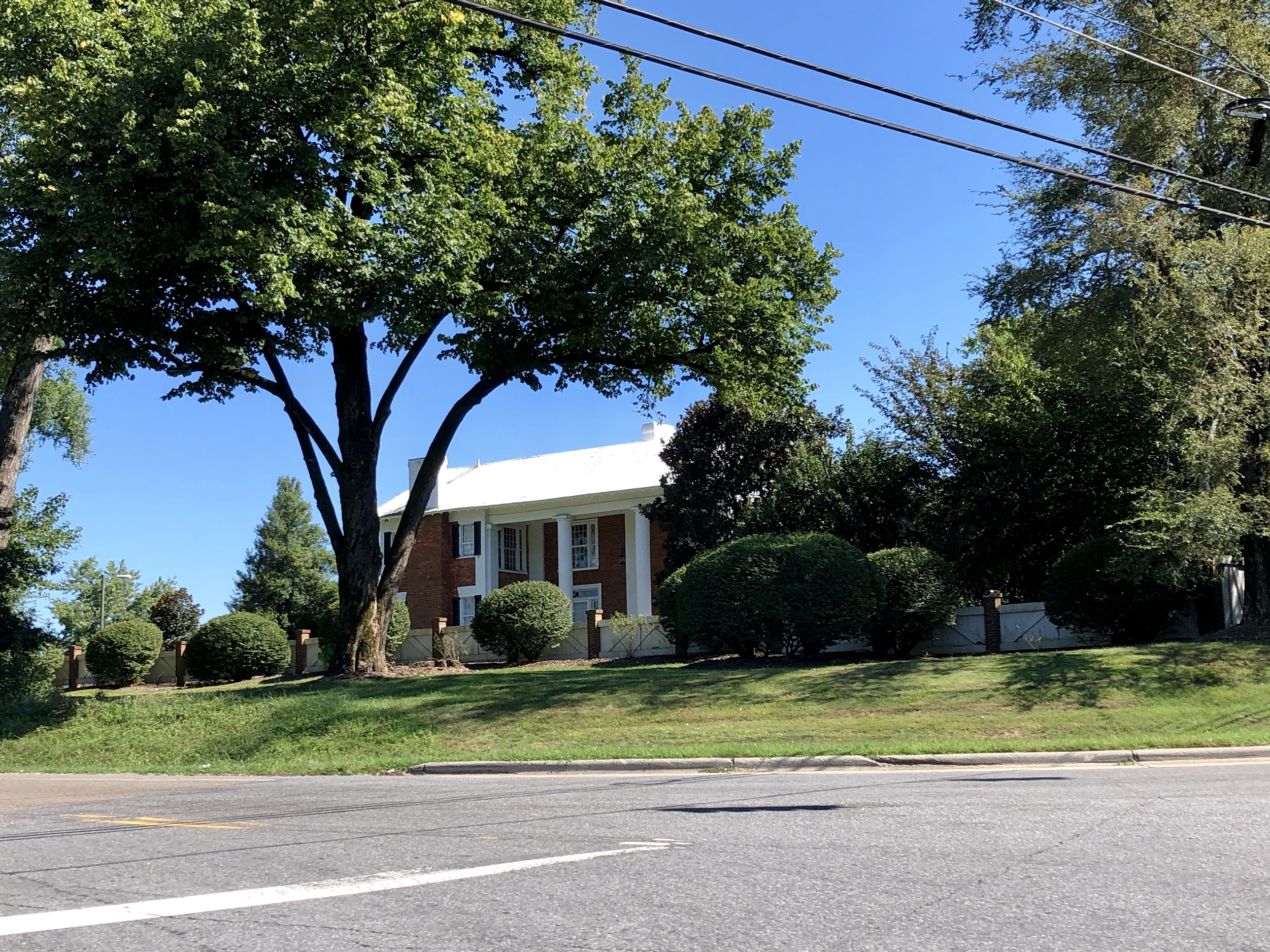
- Magnolia Place, August 2019

- Location within North Carolina Location within the United States
- Location: S of Morganton on U.S. 64 at Interstate 40, near Morganton, North Carolina
- Coordinates: 35°43′4″N 81°41′38″W
- Area: 9.9 acres (4.0 ha)
- Built: 1818, 1850
- Architectural style: Greek Revival, Federal
- NRHP reference No.: 73001297; 100002046 (decrease)

Significant dates
- Added to NRHP: June 4, 1973
- Boundary decrease: January 25, 2018

Magnolia Place is a historic home located near Morganton, Burke County, North Carolina. The original section was built about 1818, and is a two-story, five bay by two bay, brick structure in the Federal style. Attached at the rear is a one bay by two bay temple form Greek Revival style addition built about 1850. It features a long full-height porch. The addition was built by Clarke Moulton Avery, second child born to Isaac Thomas Avery, master of Swan Ponds. In 1841, he married Elizabeth Tilghman Walton, daughter of Thomas George Walton, master of Creekside.

It was listed on the National Register of Historic Places in 1973.
