= 157th New York Infantry Regiment =

- Active: Mustered in:19 September 1862; Mustered out: 10 July 1865.
- Country: USA
- Allegiance: New York
- Branch: Infantry Regiment
- Type: Volunteer
- Size: Regiment

Commanders
- Colonel of the Regiment: Philip P. Brown Jr

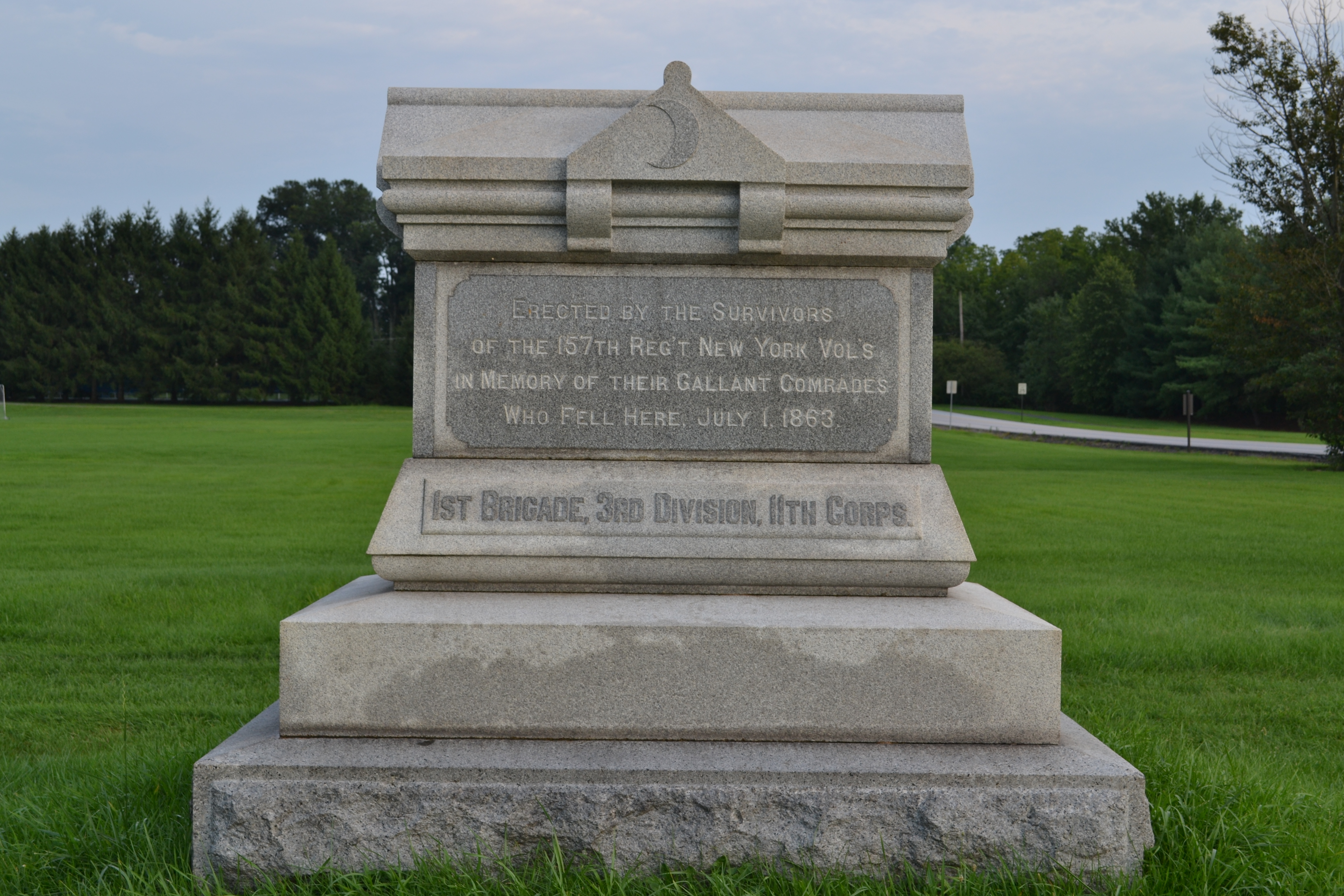
Monument to the 157th New York Volunteer Infantry at Gettysburg

The 157th New York Infantry Regiment was a regiment of infantry organized in New York state during the American Civil War.

== Organization ==
The companies were recruited principally:

- A at Hamilton, Madison, Sherburne and Georgetown;
- B at Oneida;
- C at Hamilton, Cincinnatus, Marathon, Cuyler, Taylor, Willet, Solon, Freetown and Pitcher;
- D at Scott, Preble and Homer;
- E at Cortland, Virgil, Harford and Cortlandville;
- F at Smyrna, Smithfield, Lebanon, Georgetown, Hamilton, Eaton and Madison;
- G at Canastota, Lennox, Clockville, Wampsville, Oneida and Hamilton;
- H at Homer, Truxton and Cortlandville;
- I at Sullivan, Smithfield and Hamilton;
- K at Cortlandville, Marathon, Harford, Freetown and Virgil.

== Service ==
On August 13, 1862, Colonel Philip P. Brown Jr. was authorized to recruit this regiment in the then 23d Senatorial District of the State. It was organized at Hamilton, convening in the service of the United States for three years from September 19, 1862.

On June 22, 1865, the men not to be Muster (military) with the regiment were transferred to the 54th New York Volunteer Infantry.

== Service Dates ==
The regiment left the State September 25, 1862.

Service dates are as follows:

- From October, 1862 - 1st Brigade, 3d Division, 11th Corps
- From July 13, 1863 - 2nd Brigade, 1st Division, 11th Corps
- From August, 1863 - 2nd Brigade, Gordon's Division, 10th Corps, on Folly and Morris Islands, South Carolina,
- From January, 1864 - in Schimmelfenning's Division, 10th Corps
- From February, 1864 - 1st Brigade, Ames' Division, 10th Corps, then in the District of Florida
- From June 15, 1864 - at Beaufort, South Carolina
- From September 5, 1864 - on Morris Island, South Carolina
- From October 22 to November 28, 1864 - at Fort Pulaski, Georgia
- From November 1864 - 1st, Potter's, Brigade, Coast Division, Department of the Gulf
- From February 1865 - at Georgetown, South Carolina
- July 10, 1865 - Commanded by Colonel James C. Carmichael, it was honorably discharged and mustered out at Charleston, South Carolina.

== Legacy ==
During the American Civil War the 157th participated in the Mud March, the Battle of Chancellorsville, and the Battle of Gettysburg. On the first day at Gettysburg they suffered in heavy fighting north of the town. On the second day they were a reserve regiment rushed to the aid of the 137th New York holding the right flank on Culp's Hill.

They guarded the "Immortal 600" Confederate officers at Fort Pulaski, Georgia. This was a special group of prisoners that were there for the "purpose of retaliation". Brown and his men, though, treated the prisoners better than their orders specified and this led to an official reprimand for Brown, much to the Confederates' dismay.

== Roster ==
- "Cortland County Enlistment 157th NYVI In Town Order". rootsweb.com.

== Casualties ==
- Killed in action, 5 officers, 50 enlisted men;
- Died of wounds received in action, 2 Officers, 40 enlisted men;
- Died of disease and other causes, 2 officers, 104 enlisted men;
- Total, 9 officers, 194 enlisted men;
- Aggregate, 203; of whom 1 officer, 4 enlisted men, died in the hands of the enemy

== See also ==
- List of New York Civil War regiments
