= Alphonso Calhoun Avery =

American politician

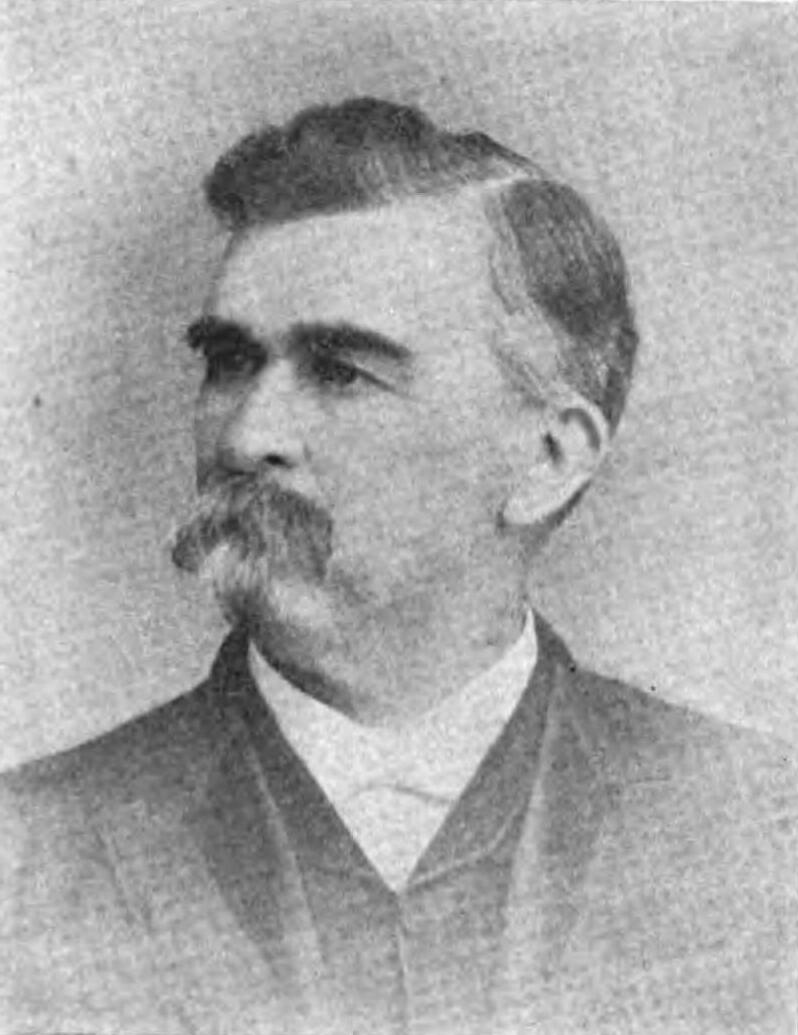

Justice of the North Carolina Supreme Court
- In office 1888–1896

Member of the North Carolina House of Representatives
- In office 1866

Personal details
- Born: September 11, 1835 Swan Ponds, Burke County, North Carolina
- Died: June 13, 1913 (aged 77) Morganton, North Carolina
- Education: University of North Carolina
- Occupation: Jurist, military officer, politician
- Known for: lawyer, Confederate military officer, and politician in North Carolina

Alphonso Calhoun Avery (September 11, 1835 – June 13, 1913) was a lawyer, Confederate military officer, and politician in North Carolina. During the American Civil War, he served with the rank of major on the staffs of General Daniel Harvey Hill and John Bell Hood. After the Civil War, he was very active in politics in North Carolina.

== Early life and education ==
Avery was born on September 11, 1835, at Swan Ponds, Burke County, North Carolina, his brothers included William Waightstill Avery and Isaac Avery. He received a Bachelor of Arts degree from the University of North Carolina in 1857. He then studied law under Chief Justice Pearson of North Carolina.

== Military career ==
Avery served in the 6th North Carolina regiment as a 1st lieutenant and captain. He then served as assistant inspector general with the rank of major on the staffs of General Daniel Harvey Hill, his brother in law via his marriage to Susan Morrison, and J. B. Hood.

Another brother-in-law via marriage to a daughter of Robert Hall Morrison was Thomas "Stonewall" Jackson.

Near the end of the Civil War, Avery was captured by Union forces near Salisbury, North Carolina, on April 12, 1865, along with his brother, Willoughby.

== Political career ==
In 1866, he served as a member of the North Carolina House of Representatives.

In 1868, he was elected to the senate but not allowed to take his seat.

He served as a member of the Constitutional Convention in 1875 and as a Tilden elector in 1876.

He served as a judge of the Superior Court from 1878 to 1888. From 1888 to 1896, he was a judge of the Supreme Court for North Carolina. He was defeated in his reelection attempt in 1896.

== Death and legacy ==
He died in Morganton, North Carolina, on June 13, 1913.

His house known as the Alphonse Calhoun Avery House or the Avery-Surnrnersette House was listed on the National Register of Historic Places in 1984.

His papers are held by the Louis Round Wilson Library at the University of North Carolina at Chapel Hill.

His daughter Gladys Avery Tillett was politically active in North Carolina, from suffrage to the Equal Rights Amendment, and served as a United States representative with UNESCO.
