= Edward Longacre =

American historian and writer (born 1946)

Edward G. Longacre (born December 22, 1946) is an American historian and writer. He specializes in American Civil War historiography. He received a doctorate in American history from Temple University, where he studied under the late Professor Russell F. Weigley. Since 2000, he has been an honorary director of the United States Cavalry Association.

== Life ==
He was born on December 22, 1946. He was born and raised in New Jersey and has been a resident of Audubon, New Jersey.

== Career ==
He is famous for his numerous biographies of Civil War generals. He has received multiple awards including the Moncado Prize in 1981, the Fletcher Pratt Award in 1986, the Douglas Southall Freeman History Award in 2004, and the Dr. James I. Robertson Jr. Literary Prize for in 2015.

== Bibliography ==
His notable books include:

- Joshua Chamberlain: The Soldier And The Man ISBN 9780306813122
- General John Buford: A Military Biography ISBN 9780306812743
- General Ulysses S. Grant: The Soldier and the Man ISBN 9780306812699
- War in the Ruins: The American Army's Final Battle Against Nazi Germany ISBN 9781594161179
- Lincoln's Cavalrymen: A History of the Mounted Forces of the Army of the Potomac ISBN 9780811710497
- The Early Morning of War: Bull Run, 1861 ISBN 9780806144986
- Lee's Cavalrymen: A History of the Mounted Forces of the Army of Northern Virginia, 1861-1865 ISBN 9780811708982
- Custer and His Wolverines: The Michigan Cavalry Brigade, 1861-1865 ISBN 9780306813832
- Custer: The Making of a Young General ISBN 9781510733190
- The Cavalry at Gettysburg: A Tactical Study of Mounted Operations during the Civil War's Pivotal Campaign, 9 June-14 July 1863 ISBN 9780803279414
- A Regiment of Slaves: The 4th United States Colored Infantry, 1863-1866 ISBN 9780811700122
- Unsung Hero of Gettysburg: The Story of Union General David McMurtrie Gregg ISBN 9781640124585
