= Waightstill Avery =

American politician

- Born: May 10, 1741; Groton, Connecticut, British America
- Died: March 15, 1821 (aged 79); Morganton, North Carolina, U.S.
- Spouse: Leah Probart Francks
- Military career
- Allegiance: United States of America
- Branch: North Carolina militia
- Service years: 1779-1781
- Rank: Colonel
- Unit: Burke County Regiment
- Commands: Jones County Regiment

Waightstill Avery (10 May 1741 – 15 March 1821) was an early American lawyer and officer in the North Carolina militia during the American Revolution. He is noted for fighting a duel with future U.S. president Andrew Jackson in 1788.

== Family ==
Avery married Leah Probart Francks (d. 13 January 1832) on 3 October 1778 in New Bern, North Carolina.

A grandson, Isaac E. Avery, served as a colonel in the Confederate States Army during the American Civil War, perishing at the Battle of Gettysburg. Another grandson was William Waightstill Avery, speaker of the North Carolina Senate and a member of the Confederate Congress.

== Career ==
Avery enrolled at Yale in 1763. After two years, unhappy with the oppressive discipline of the college's unpopular president, Thomas Clapp, he and his friend Oliver Ellsworth transferred to the College of New Jersey (today's Princeton University). Ellsworth would go on to become a congressman, a framer of the Constitution, and a Justice of the Supreme Court; the two remained fast friends, even after Avery moved to North Carolina following graduation.

Avery quickly became a successful attorney in the Piedmont region of the colony. He took a leading role, along with other Princeton graduates like Joseph Alexander, Hezekiah Balch, and David Caldwell, in the unsuccessful attempt to win a Royal charter for what would have been North Carolina's first college, in 1771. Queen's College, in Charlotte, was incorporated by the colonial legislature but disallowed by King George III. It continued for several years as a preparatory school, with a library donated by Avery.

Avery was elected to the colonial assembly in 1772 and served as attorney-general for the Crown. In 1775 and 1776, Avery was elected to the North Carolina Provincial Congresses and in that capacity helped draft the first Constitution of North Carolina in 1776. He was the first Attorney General of North Carolina (1777–1779) and a colonel in the state's militia during the American Revolutionary War; he also served in the North Carolina General Assembly (the House of Commons in 1782, 1783, 1784, 1785, 1793, and the Senate in 1796). He was among the early instigators clamoring for the colony's independence from Great Britain. In March 1790, he was a candidate in the first election for the 4th congressional district.

His service record in the American Revolution includes:

- Colonel over the Jones County Regiment of the North Carolina militia (1779-1780)
- Captain in the Burke County Regiment of the North Carolina militia (1781)

According to the Dictionary of North Carolina Biography (ed. Powell, Vol I. p. 70) "In 1780, while occupying Charlotte, Cornwallis ordered the burning of Avery's office; of his books and papers, only those stored at the home of his friend Hezekiah Alexander were saved. This evidence of displeasure was visited only upon those whom Cornwallis considered leading offenders."

== Duel with Andrew Jackson ==
In 1788, Avery was challenged to a duel by Andrew Jackson, then a young lawyer in the western territory that would become Tennessee. According to legend, Avery, already one of the state's most prominent lawyers by then, would often proclaim "I refer to Bacon"—meaning The Elements of the Common Laws of England, the noted legal text written by Francis Bacon—when making a point. One day, it is said that Jackson surreptitiously replaced the volume with an actual side of bacon in Avery's saddlebags. Embarrassed when Avery scolded him for levity in the courtroom, "Old Hickory" is supposed to have issued the challenge. Whatever the actual cause, the duel took place. The two men met on the field of honor, each intentionally missed the other while firing, and they left fast friends.

== Honoraria ==
Avery County, North Carolina was named for him, as is the Waightstill Avery Chapter of the Daughters of the American Revolution in Brevard, North Carolina.

The Swan Ponds plantation home built by his son Isaac Thomas Avery in 1848, was listed on the National Register of Historic Places in 1973.

No paintings or visual depictions of Avery are known to exist.
