= Isaac E. Avery =

Confederate Army officer (1828–1863)

Isaac Erwin Avery
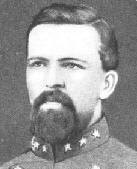
- Isaac Erwin Avery, 1862 or 1863
- Born: December 20, 1828; Burke County, North Carolina, US
- Died: July 3, 1863 (aged 34); Gettysburg, Pennsylvania, US
- Burial place: Hagerstown, Maryland, US
- Military career
- Allegiance: Confederate States of America
- Branch: Confederate States Army
- Service years: 1861–63
- Rank: Colonel
- Nickname: "Ike"
- Conflicts: American Civil War; First Battle of Bull Run; Battle of Seven Pines; Seven Days Battles; Battle of Gaines' Mill; Battle of Fredericksburg; Battle of Chancellorsville; Battle of Gettysburg; Assault on Cemetery Hill †

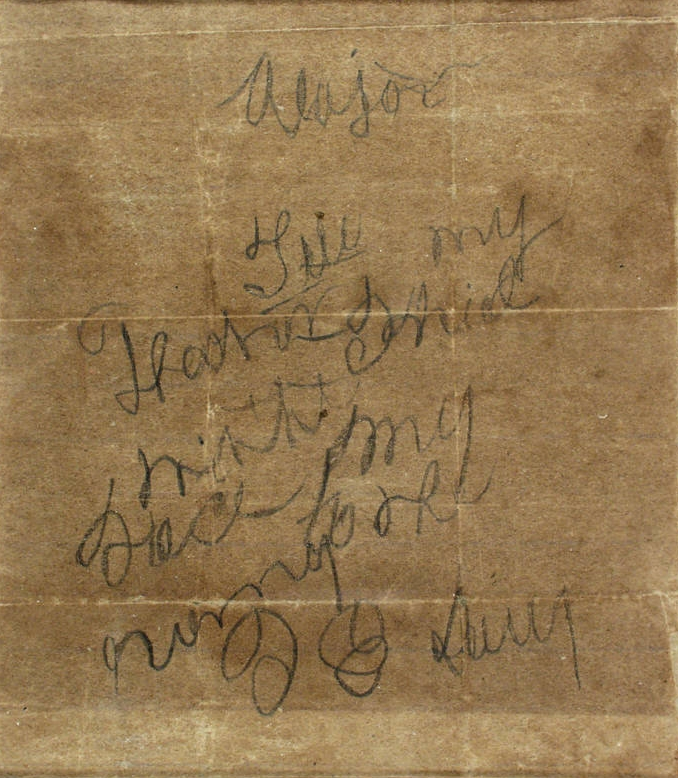
Isaac Avery's bloodstained message to his father (State Archives of North Carolina)

Isaac Erwin Avery (December 20, 1828 – July 3, 1863) was a planter and an officer in the Confederate States Army. He died at the Battle of Gettysburg during the American Civil War. Avery is most remembered for a poignant blood-stained note that he wrote as he lay dying on the slopes of Cemetery Hill at Gettysburg.

== Early life ==
Isaac Erwin Avery was born at Swan Ponds in Burke County, North Carolina, the fourth son of Isaac Thomas and Harriet Erwin Avery, who in total had 16 children. Three of the brothers, including Col. Clark M. Avery of the 33rd North Carolina, and William Waightstill Avery would be killed during the Civil War and another crippled for life.

Avery was the grandson of Waightstill Avery (1741–1821), a fiery American Revolutionary War hero who served as the first attorney general of North Carolina and who had once been challenged to a duel by Andrew Jackson. Isaac attended the University of North Carolina for one year in 1847, but left to manage a plantation for his father in Yancey County. Avery owned a slave named Elijah.

Avery later formed a partnership with Charles F. Fisher and Samuel McDowell Tate to act as contractors in the building of the Western North Carolina Railroad in the mid-1850s.

== Civil War service ==
With his state's secession from the Union, Isaac returned to Burke County, and with his brother Alphonso, recruited Company E of the 6th North Carolina Regiment. As captain, Avery commanded the company, which fought in the First Battle of Bull Run and the Battle of Seven Pines. In the summer of 1862, he was promoted to colonel. He was wounded at Gaines' Mill and was out of action until late in the fall. Avery's recovery caused him to miss the battles at Second Bull Run and Antietam. Following the reorganization of the army after the Battle of Fredericksburg, the 6th North Carolina was placed under the command of veteran Brig. Gen. Robert F. Hoke.

=== Gettysburg and death ===
With Hoke's wounding at the Battle of Chancellorsville in May 1863, Avery temporarily assumed command of the brigade in time for the Gettysburg campaign. The now 34-year-old Avery led his troops forward on July 1 on a wide sweep north and east of the borough of Gettysburg. Union artillery fire from a knoll near Culp's Hill finally halted his advance. On July 2, Maj. Gen. Jubal A. Early ordered Avery along with the brigade of Brig. Gen. Harry T. Hays to assault eastern Cemetery Hill. Attacking in the early evening, Avery was struck in the neck by a musket ball and fell from his white horse, bleeding badly. Apparently he was alone at the time, and the brigade's attack was delivered without coordination. After the ill-fated charge, the partially paralyzed officer was discovered by several of his soldiers. His aide and former business partner, Maj. Samuel Tate of the 6th North Carolina, knelt by his side. Unable to speak from his mortal wound and with his right hand useless from the paralysis, Avery with his left hand scribbled a simple note and gave it to Tate. It said: "Major, tell my father I died with my face to the enemy. I. E. Avery."

Avery died the following day in a nearby Gettysburg field hospital. He was initially buried in Riverview Cemetery in Williamsport, Maryland, but later reburied at Washington Confederate Cemetery, part of Rose Hill Cemetery, in Hagerstown, Maryland.

== Legacy ==
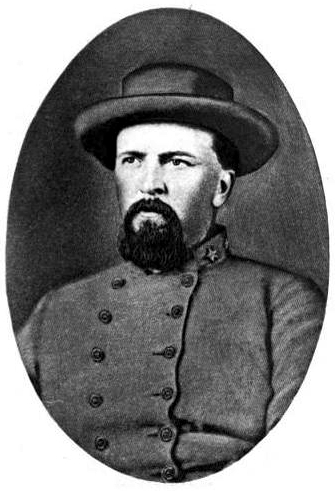
Colonel Isaac Erwin Avery

Accolades were quick to come for the fallen Tar Heel colonel. The man who assumed the brigade command with Avery's demise, Col. Archibald C. Godwin, wrote in his official report: "Here I learned for the first time that our brigade commander (Col. Isaac E. Avery), had been mortally wounded. In his death the country lost one of her truest and bravest sons, and the army one of its most gallant and efficient officers."

Gen. Early in his report wrote: "I had to regret the absence of the gallant Brigadier-General Hoke, who was severely wounded in the action of May 4, at Fredericksburg, and had not recovered, but his place was worthily filled by Colonel Avery, of the Sixth North Carolina Regiment, who fell, mortally wounded, while gallantly leading his brigade in the charge on Cemetery Hill, at Gettysburg, on the afternoon of July 2. In his death the Confederacy lost a good and brave soldier."

The Isaac E. Avery Chapter #282 of the Military Order of the Stars and Bars, a fraternal organization, is named in memory of the colonel.
