= Swan Ponds =

Historic house in North Carolina, United States

- U.S. National Register of Historic Places
- Location within North Carolina Location within the United States
- Location: About 4 miles W of Morganton off NC 126, near Morganton, North Carolina
- Coordinates: 35°44′36″N 81°45′23″W
- Area: 8 acres (3.2 ha)
- Built: 1848
- Architectural style: Greek Revival
- NRHP reference No.: 73001299
- Added to NRHP: April 24, 1973

Swan Ponds is a historic plantation house located near Morganton, Burke County, North Carolina. It was built in 1848, and is a two-story, three-bay, brick mansion with a low hip roof in the Greek Revival style. It features a one-story low hip-roof porch with bracketed eaves, a low pedimented central pavilion, and square columns. The building's brickwork is laid in Flemish bond. Swan Ponds plantation was the home of Waightstill Avery (1741–1821), an early American lawyer and soldier. His son Isaac Thomas Avery built the present Swan Ponds dwelling. Swan Ponds was the birthplace of North Carolina politician and lawyer William Waightstill Avery (1816–1864), Clarke Moulton Avery owner of Magnolia Place, and Confederate States Army officer Isaac E. Avery (1828–1863).

It was listed on the National Register of Historic Places in 1973.
