= William Waightstill Avery =

American politician

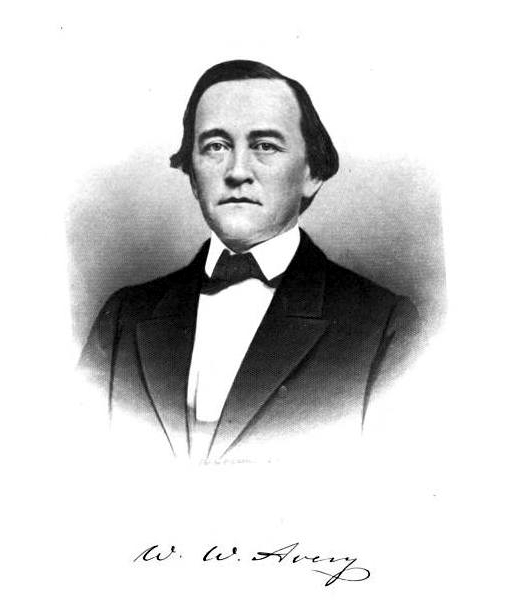

Speaker of the North Carolina Senate
- In office 1856

Representative for North Carolina in the Provisional Confederate Congress
- In office 1861

Personal details
- Born: May 25, 1816 Swan Ponds, North Carolina, US
- Died: July 3, 1864 (aged 48) Morganton, North Carolina, US
- Cause of death: Killed in action
- Occupation: lawyer, politician, soldier
- Known for: Advocate for the University of North Carolina

William Waightstill Avery (May 25, 1816 – July 3, 1864) was a North Carolina politician and lawyer. He served in the North Carolina House of Commons and State Senate prior to the U.S. Civil War. He represented North Carolina in the Provisional Confederate Congress. He was an outspoken advocate of higher education, graduate of the University of North Carolina and member of the Board of Trustees of the university. Avery owned a number of slaves, including 22 whom he inherited from his father.

== Early life ==
Born at Swan Ponds in Burke County, North Carolina, he was the brother of Isaac E. Avery, the son of Isaac Thomas Avery, and the grandson of Waightstill Avery. In 1837, Avery graduated from the University of North Carolina and delivered the valedictory address at the graduation ceremony. In 1846 Avery married Mary Corinna Morehead, the daughter of Gov. John Motley Morehead.

At Marion, N.C. in the fall of 1851, Avery was beaten with a cowhide whip by Samuel Fleming, a merchant from Burnsville, who was a participant in a lawsuit in which Avery appeared as legal counsel for Ephraim Greenlee. Avery was unarmed and a smaller man than Fleming. He could not defend himself. Several weeks later Fleming came to Morganton bragging of his courage and making unpleasant comments about Avery. When Fleming appeared in the courtroom and stood five feet from Avery and near the presiding judge, Avery shot Fleming dead where he stood. Avery was brought to trial for murder but was acquitted on the grounds of extreme provocation leading to temporary insanity.

== Political career ==
A Democrat, Avery served in the North Carolina House of Commons and later in the North Carolina Senate to which he was elected Speaker in 1856. He ran for Congress in 1858, but a split among the Democrats led to a victory by Zebulon B. Vance.

In 1860 Avery was a representative to the Democratic Party Convention in Charleston. He had a prominent role on the committee which wrote the party platform, which divided the party over how to address the issue of slavery, particularly the Fugitive Slave Act. Due to this, there was a later convention held in Baltimore which did not include delegates from several slave states and divided the Democratic party into Northern and Southern factions leading up to the election of 1860.

After North Carolina seceded from the union in 1861, Avery was chosen to represent the state in the Provisional Confederate Congress. Then, he returned to Burke County to raise a regiment for the Confederate States Army. Several of Avery's brothers had prominent roles in the Confederate Army, most notably Isaac Avery who was killed while leading his regiment at Gettysburg, but William Waightstill Avery spent most of the Civil War in Morganton attending to family business. He died in Morganton from wounds received in a skirmish with a party of Tennessee Unionists in 1864 after a raid on Camp Vance by the Union's 3rd North Carolina Mounted Infantry, one year to the day after the death of his brother Isaac.

== Namesakes ==
Avery Hall at the University of North Carolina was named in his honor.
