= List of Omega Psi Phi chapters =

Omega Psi Phi is an international historically Black fraternity. It was founded in 1911 at Howard University in Washington, D.C. The fraternity has both undergraduate (college) and graduate chapters. Its intermediate chapters are a combination of the two as a citywide organization.

== College chapters ==
The following list of college chapters is ordered by charter date, with active chapters indicated in bold and inactive chapters and institutions are in italics.

Number	Chapter	Charter date and range	Institution	Location	Status	Ref.
1001	**Alpha**	December 15, 1911	Howard University	Washington, D.C.	Active	
1002	**Beta**	February 6, 1914 – xxxx ?; February 6, 2014	Lincoln University	Chester County, Pennsylvania	Active	
1003	**Gamma**	December 13, 1916	Boston College	Boston, Massachusetts	Active	(Note: Chapter was formed at Boston College and is now the Boston citywide undergraduate chapter.)
1003	**Gamma**	December 13, 1916	Boston University	Boston, Massachusetts	Active	(Note: Chapter was formed at Boston College and is now the Boston citywide undergraduate chapter.)
1003	**Gamma**	December 13, 1916	Emerson College	Boston, Massachusetts	Active	(Note: Chapter was formed at Boston College and is now the Boston citywide undergraduate chapter.)
1003	**Gamma**	December 13, 1916	Harvard University	Boston, Massachusetts	Active	(Note: Chapter was formed at Boston College and is now the Boston citywide undergraduate chapter.)
1003	**Gamma**	December 13, 1916	Massachusetts Institute of Technology	Boston, Massachusetts	Active	(Note: Chapter was formed at Boston College and is now the Boston citywide undergraduate chapter.)
1003	**Gamma**	December 13, 1916	Northeastern University	Boston, Massachusetts	Active	(Note: Chapter was formed at Boston College and is now the Boston citywide undergraduate chapter.)
1003	**Gamma**	December 13, 1916	Tufts University	Boston, Massachusetts	Active	(Note: Chapter was formed at Boston College and is now the Boston citywide undergraduate chapter.)
1003	**Gamma**	December 13, 1916	University of Massachusetts Boston	Boston, Massachusetts	Active	(Note: Chapter was formed at Boston College and is now the Boston citywide undergraduate chapter.)
1004	**Delta**	January 22, 1919	Meharry Medical College	Nashville, Tennessee	Active	
1005	Epsilon (First)	April 18, 1919 – 1960; 1962–20xx ?	City College of New York	New York City, New York	Moved	(Note: This is now a graduate chapter.)
1005	Epsilon (First)	April 18, 1919 – 1960; 1962–20xx ?	Columbia University	New York City, New York	Moved	(Note: This is now a graduate chapter.)
1005	Epsilon (First)	April 18, 1919 – 1960; 1962–20xx ?	New York University	New York City, New York	Moved	(Note: This is now a graduate chapter.)
1006	**Zeta**	October 20, 1919	Virginia Union University	Richmond, Virginia	Active	
1007	Eta (First)	December 1, 1919 – 1922	Atlanta University	Atlanta, Georgia	Reassigned	(Note: This chapter consisted of multiple colleges and graduate members. It soon split into separate chapters for each group, including "Omicron" at Gammon Theological Seminary, "Psi" at Morehouse, and "Tau" at Atlanta University, Beta Psi at Clark, and Eta Omega for graduates.)
1007	Eta (First)	December 1, 1919 – 1922	Clark College	Atlanta, Georgia	Reassigned	(Note: This chapter consisted of multiple colleges and graduate members. It soon split into separate chapters for each group, including "Omicron" at Gammon Theological Seminary, "Psi" at Morehouse, and "Tau" at Atlanta University, Beta Psi at Clark, and Eta Omega for graduates.)
1007	Eta (First)	December 1, 1919 – 1922	Gammon Theological Seminary	Atlanta, Georgia	Reassigned	(Note: This chapter consisted of multiple colleges and graduate members. It soon split into separate chapters for each group, including "Omicron" at Gammon Theological Seminary, "Psi" at Morehouse, and "Tau" at Atlanta University, Beta Psi at Clark, and Eta Omega for graduates.)
1007	Eta (First)	December 1, 1919 – 1922	Morehouse College	Atlanta, Georgia	Reassigned	(Note: This chapter consisted of multiple colleges and graduate members. It soon split into separate chapters for each group, including "Omicron" at Gammon Theological Seminary, "Psi" at Morehouse, and "Tau" at Atlanta University, Beta Psi at Clark, and Eta Omega for graduates.)
1010	Kappa (First)	1920–1921	West Virginia State University	Institute, West Virginia	Inactive, Reassigned	
1007	Eta (Second)	1921–19xx ?	Harvard University	Cambridge, Massachusetts	Inactive, Reassigned	(Note: Harvard is now part of Gamma chapter.)
1013	**Nu**	March 15, 1921	Pennsylvania State University	University Park, Pennsylvania	Active	
1014	**Xi**	May 23, 1921	University of Minnesota	Minneapolis, Minnesota	Active	
1015	Omicron (First)	October 1, 1921 – 19xx ?	Interdenominational Theological Center	Atlanta, Georgia	Inactive, Reassigned	(Note: Chapter was chartered at Gammon Theological Seminary, later called the Interdenominational Theological Center. It was originally part of Eta (First) chapter.)
1021	Phi (First)	October 1, 1921 – 1922	Talladega College	Talladega, Alabama	Reassigned	
1022	Chi (First)	October 1, 1921 – 1929	Citywide undergraduate chapter	New Haven, Connecticut	Inactive, Reassigned	
1017	**Rho**	December 5, 1921	Johnson C. Smith University	Charlotte, North Carolina	Active	(Note: Chapter was chartered at Biddle College, which is now Johnson C. Smith University.)
1021	**Phi (Second)**	January 1, 1922	University of Michigan	Ann Arbor, Michigan	Active	
1010	**Kappa (Second)**	February 18, 1922 – 193x ?; Spring 1968	Syracuse University	Syracuse, New York	Active	
1023	**Psi**	April 7, 1922	Morehouse College	Atlanta, Georgia	Active	(Note: Was originally part of Eta (First) chapter.)
1019	Tau	May 1, 1922 – 1988	Atlanta University	Atlanta, Georgia	Consolidated	(Note: When Atlanta University and Clark College merged to form Clark Atlanta University in 1988, the two Omega Psi Phi chapters consolidated into Beta Psi.)
1024	Alpha Psi (First)	October 1, 1922 – 19xx ?	Amherst College	Amherst, Massachusetts	Inactive	
1008	**Theta**	December 17, 1922	Wiley College	Marshall, Texas	Active	
1020	**Upsilon (Second)**	April 1, 1923	Wilberforce University	Wilberforce, Ohio	Active	
1011	**Lambda (Second)**	May 3, 1923	California State University, Los Angeles	Los Angeles, California	Active	(Note: Chapter was originally chartered at the University of Southern California.)
1011	**Lambda (Second)**	May 3, 1923	California State University, Northridge	Los Angeles, California	Active	(Note: Chapter was originally chartered at the University of Southern California.)
1011	**Lambda (Second)**	May 3, 1923	University of California, Los Angeles	Los Angeles, California	Active	(Note: Chapter was originally chartered at the University of Southern California.)
1011	**Lambda (Second)**	May 3, 1923	University of Southern California	Los Angeles, California	Active	(Note: Chapter was originally chartered at the University of Southern California.)
1012	**Mu (Second)**	May 23, 1923	University of Pennsylvania	Philadelphia, Pennsylvania	Active	
1009	Iota (Second)	October 12, 1923 – 1950s; September 9, 1957 – 1983	University of Chicago	Chicago, Illinois	Inactive, Reassigned	(Note: Starting in May 1924, this was a citywide undergraduate chapter and later served as an intermediate chapter. After going inactive, it was reestablished as a graduate chapter in 1995.)
1016	**Pi**	October 28, 1923	Morgan State University	Baltimore, Maryland	Active	
1018	Sigma (Second)	December 15, 1923 – 192x ?	McGill University	Montreal, Quebec, Canada	Inactive, Reassigned	
	**Omega**				Memorial	
1025	**Beta Psi**	December 22, 1923	Clark Atlanta University	Atlanta, Georgia	Active	(Note: Chapter originated at Clark College, becoming Clark Atlantic University in 1988. It was originally part of the multi-college Eta (First) chapter.)
1026	**Gamma Psi**	October 1, 1921	Talladega College	Talladega, Alabama	Active	
1027	**Delta Psi**	January 9, 1924	Shaw University	Raleigh, North Carolina	Active	
1029	**Zeta Psi**	December 24, 1924	Brooklyn College	Brooklyn, New York	Active	
1029	**Zeta Psi**	December 24, 1924	LIU Brooklyn	Brooklyn, New York	Active	
1029	**Zeta Psi**	December 24, 1924	Medgar Evers College	Brooklyn, New York	Active	
1029	**Zeta Psi**	December 24, 1924	New York City College of Technology	Brooklyn, New York	Active	
1029	**Zeta Psi**	December 24, 1924	Pratt Institute	Brooklyn, New York	Active	
1029	**Zeta Psi**	December 24, 1924	St. Francis College	Brooklyn, New York	Active	
1029	**Zeta Psi**	December 24, 1924	State University of New York at New Paltz	Brooklyn, New York	Active	
1029	**Zeta Psi**	December 24, 1924	Wagner College	Brooklyn, New York	Active	
1028	Epsilon Psi (First)	1925–19xx ?	University of San Francisco	San Francisco, California	Inactive, Reassigned	
1032	**Iota Psi**	March 17, 1926	Ohio State University	Columbus, Ohio	Active	
1030	**Eta Psi**	April 28, 1926	Fisk University	Nashville, Tennessee	Active	
1031	**Theta Psi**	May 22, 1926	West Virginia State University	Kanawha County, West Virginia	Active	
1033	**Kappa Psi**	November 19, 1926	Howard University	Washington, D.C.	Active	(Note: Chartered for the professional students at Howard University, Kappa Psi was an intermediate chapter from 1926 until 2000. It has also included undergraduates from Georgetown University, George Washington University, American University, and Catholic University.)
1034	**Lambda Psi**	March 27, 1927	Livingstone College	Salisbury, North Carolina	Active	
1035	**Mu Psi**	March 27, 1927	North Carolina A&T State University	Greensboro, North Carolina	Active	
1036	**Nu Psi**	December 12, 1927	Virginia State University	Petersburg, Virginia	Active	
1037	**Xi Psi**	March 10, 1928	South Carolina State University	Orangeburg, South Carolina	Active	
1038	**Omicron Psi**	March 10, 1928	Carlow University	Pittsburgh, Pennsylvania	Active	
1038	**Omicron Psi**	March 10, 1928	Carnegie Mellon University	Pittsburgh, Pennsylvania	Active	
1038	**Omicron Psi**	March 10, 1928	Chatham University	Pittsburgh, Pennsylvania	Active	
1038	**Omicron Psi**	March 10, 1928	Duquesne University	Pittsburgh, Pennsylvania	Active	
1038	**Omicron Psi**	March 10, 1928	Point Park University	Pittsburgh, Pennsylvania	Active	
1038	**Omicron Psi**	March 10, 1928	Robert Morris University	Pittsburgh, Pennsylvania	Active	
1038	**Omicron Psi**	March 10, 1928	Seton Hill University	Pittsburgh, Pennsylvania	Active	
1038	**Omicron Psi**	March 10, 1928	University of Pittsburgh	Pittsburgh, Pennsylvania	Active	
1040	**Pi Psi**	October 29, 1929	University of Illinois Urbana-Champaign	Champaign, Illinois	Active	
1039	**Rho Psi**	April 30, 1930	Tennessee State University	Nashville, Tennessee	Active	
1041	Sigma Psi (First)	December 8, 1930 – 1953	Samuel Huston College	Austin, Texas	Consolidated	(Note: When Samuel Huston College and Tillotson College merged to form Huston–Tillotson University, Sigma Psi and Epsilon Sigma consolidated to form Alpha Psi chapter.)
1042	**Tau Psi**	November 17, 1931	North Carolina Central University	Durham, North Carolina	Active	
1043	**Upsilon Psi**	May 13, 1932	Florida A&M University	Tallahassee, Florida	Active	
1044	**Phi Psi**	July 21, 1933	Langston University	Langston, Oklahoma	Active	
1045	**Chi Psi**	March 12, 1932	LeMoyne–Owen College	Memphis, Tennessee	Active	
1046	**Psi Psi**	November 9, 1934	Kentucky State University	Frankfort, Kentucky	Active	
1047	**Alpha Sigma**	May 25, 1935	Morris Brown College	Atlanta, Georgia	Active	
1051	Epsilon Sigma (First)	December 8, 1935 – 1953	Tillotson College	Austin, Texas	Consolidated	
1048	Beta Sigma	February 28, 1936 – July 2025	Southern University	Baton Rouge, Louisiana	Inactive	(Note: Chapter was expelled by the university after a student died as the result of hazing.)
1049	**Gamma Sigma**	April 1, 1936	Alabama State University	Montgomery, Alabama	Active	
1050	**Delta Sigma**	May 2, 1936	Eastern Kentucky University	Richmond, Kentucky	Active	
1053	**Eta Sigma**	May 6, 1936	Lincoln University of Missouri	Jefferson City, Missouri	Active	
1054	**Theta Sigma**	October 1, 1936	Dillard University	New Orleans, Louisiana	Active	
1058	**Mu Sigma**	October 1, 1936	Allen University	Columbia, South Carolina	Active	
1056	**Kappa Sigma**	December 3, 1937	Lane College	Jackson, Tennessee	Active	
1057	**Lambda Sigma**	May 21, 1938	Claflin University	Orangeburg, South Carolina	Active	
1059	**Nu Sigma**	May 23, 1938	Wayne State University	Detroit, Michigan	Active	
1060	**Xi Sigma**	October 1, 1938	Xavier University of Louisiana	New Orleans, Louisiana	Active	
1052	**Zeta Sigma**	May 16, 1939	Bluefield State College	Bluefield, West Virginia	Active	
1062	**Pi Sigma**	October 1, 1942	Philander Smith College	Little Rock, Arkansas	Active	
1063	**Rho Sigma**	April 19, 1942	Purdue University	West Lafayette, Indiana	Active	
1064	**Sigma Sigma**	September 24, 1942	Texas College	Tyler, Texas	Active	
1061	**Omicron Sigma**	October 1, 1942	Harris-Stowe State University	St. Louis, Missouri	Active	
1065	**Tau Sigma**	March 11, 1945	University of Arkansas-Pine Bluff	Pine Bluff, Arkansas	Active	
1066	**Upsilon Sigma**	May 1, 1946	Fort Valley State University	Fort Valley, Georgia	Active	
1067	**Phi Sigma**	May 1, 1946	Western Reserve University	Cleveland, Ohio	Active	
1068	**Chi Sigma**	May 1, 1946	Indiana State University	Terre Haute, Indiana	Active	
1070	**Alpha Epsilon**	January 1, 1946	University of Arizona	Tucson, Arizona	Active	
1071	Beta Epsilon	October 1, 1946 – xxxx ?	Knoxville College	Knoxville, Tennessee	Inactive	
1457	**Beta Omicron**	December 1, 1946	University of West Florida	Pensacola, Florida	Active	(Note: This is an intermediate chapter.)
1092	**Psi Epsilon**	December 17, 1946	Delaware State University	Dover, Delaware	Active	
1069	**Psi Sigma**	January 3, 1947	Northwestern University	Evanston, Illinois	Active	
1072	**Gamma Epsilon**	February 12, 1947	Hampton University	Hampton, Virginia	Active	
1085	**Pi Epsilon**	May 3, 1947	University of Maryland Eastern Shore	Princess Anne, Maryland	Active	
1074	**Epsilon Epsilon**	May 8, 1947	Benedict College	Columbia, South Carolina	Active	
1077	**Theta Epsilon**	June 27, 1947	Brown University	Providence, Rhode Island	Active	
1073	**Delta Epsilon**	October 1, 1947	Bowling Green State University	Bowling Green, Ohio	Active	
1076	**Eta Epsilon**	October 1, 1947	Miles College	Fairfield, Alabama	Active	
1078	**Iota Epsilon**	October 1, 1947	Towson University	Towson, Maryland	Active	
1075	**Zeta Epsilon**	October 20, 1947	Indiana University Bloomington	Bloomington, Indiana	Active	
1079	**Kappa Epsilon**	December 27, 1947	St. Augustine's University	Raleigh, North Carolina	Active	
1086	**Rho Epsilon**	March 31, 1948	Tougaloo College	Tougaloo, Mississippi	Active	
1080	**Lambda Epsilon**	April 22, 1948	Tuskegee University	Tuskegee, Alabama	Active	
1084	**Omicron Epsilon**	April 19, 1948	Bethune-Cookman University	Daytona Beach, Florida	Active	
1088	**Tau Epsilon**	May 1, 1948	Texas Southern University	Houston, Texas	Active	
1083	Xi Epsilon	May 3, 1948 – xxxx ?	Bradley University	Peoria, Illinois	Inactive	
1082	**Nu Epsilon**	October 1, 1948	Alabama A&M University	Huntsville, Alabama	Active	
1087	Sigma Epsilon (First)	October 1, 1948 – c. 1955	Roosevelt College	Chicago, Illinois	Inactive, Reassigned	
1081	**Mu Epsilon**	October 28, 1948	Winston-Salem State University	Winston-Salem, North Carolina	Active	
1094	**Alpha Gamma**	April 28, 1949	Savannah State University	Savannah, Georgia	Active	
1091	**Chi Epsilon**	April 30, 1949	Albany State University	Albany, Georgia	Active	
1089	**Upsilon Epsilon**	October 1, 1949	Jackson State University	Jackson, Mississippi	Active	
1090	**Phi Epsilon**	October 1, 1949	University at Buffalo	Buffalo, New York	Active	
1093	**Omega Epsilon**	November 1, 1949	University of Toledo	Toledo, Ohio	Active	
1007	**Eta (Third)**	November 18, 1949	Alcorn State University	Lorman, Mississippi	Active	
1095	**Beta Gamma**	December 5, 1950	Cheyney University of Pennsylvania	Cheyney, Pennsylvania	Active	
1099	**Zeta Gamma**	March 11, 1951	Youngstown State University	Youngstown, Ohio	Active	
1097	**Delta Gamma**	May 18, 1951	Fayetteville State University	Fayetteville, North Carolina	Active	
1098	Epsilon Gamma	May 18, 1951 – 2013	Saint Paul's College	Lawrenceville, Virginia	Inactive	(Note: The college closed in 2013.)
1096	**Gamma Gamma**	October 1, 1951	Grambling State University	Grambling, Louisiana	Active	
1100	Eta Gamma	October 1, 1951 – xxxx ?	Central State University	Wilberforce, Ohio	Inactive	
1101	**Theta Gamma**	May 15, 1952	Eastern Michigan University	Ypsilanti, Michigan	Active	
1102	Iota Gamma (First)	1952–19xx ?	Fresno State College	Fresno, California	Inactive, Reassigned	
1024	**Alpha Psi (Second)**	October 1, 1953	Huston–Tillotson University	Austin, Texas	Active	
1103	**Kappa Gamma**	March 8, 1954	Florida Memorial University	Miami, Florida	Active	(Note: Chapter formed at Florida Normal and Industrial Memorial College, now Florida Memorial University.)
1240	**Gamma Kappa**	March 8, 1954	Salisbury University	Salisbury, Maryland	Active	(Note: Chapter formed at Salisbury State College, now Salisbury University.)
1104	**Lambda Gamma**	May 15, 1954	Elizabeth City State University	Elizabeth City, North Carolina	Active	
1105	Mu Gamma (First)	December 4, 1957– 1986	Bishop College	Dallas, Texas	Inactive, Reassigned	(Note: The undergraduate chapter went inactive when the college closed.)
1106	**Nu Gamma**	April 1, 1959	Oakland University	Auburn Hills, Michigan	Active	
1018	**Sigma (Third)**	March 4, 1961	Michigan State University	Lansing, Michigan	Active	
1022	**Chi (Second)**	1961	Edward Waters University	Jacksonville, Florida	Active	
1108	**Omicron Gamma**	September 10, 1962	University of the District of Columbia	Washington, D.C.	Active	
1109	**Pi Gamma**	November 30, 1962	Norfolk State University	Norfolk, Virginia	Active	
1291	**Zeta Mu**	October 23, 1962	California State University, Dominguez Hills	Carson, California	Active	
1110	**Rho Gamma**	January 11, 1963	Stillman College	Tuscaloosa, Alabama	Active	
1107	**Xi Gamma**	February 3, 1963	San Jose State University	San Jose, California	Active	
1112	**Tau Gamma**	April 1, 1965	Southern Illinois University Edwardsville	Edwardsville, Illinois	Active	
1111	**Sigma Gamma**	April 26, 1965	University of New Mexico	Albuquerque, New Mexico	Active	
1028	**Epsilon Psi (Second)**	February 1, 1968	Wichita State University	Wichita, Kansas	Active	
1113	**Upsilon Gamma**	February 3, 1968	Western Michigan University	Kalamazoo, Michigan	Active	
1051	**Epsilon Sigma (Second)**	March 1, 1968	Bowie State University	Bowie, Maryland	Active	
1041	**Sigma Psi (Second)**	May 15, 1968	Ohio University	Athens, Ohio	Active	
1055	**Iota Sigma**	November 16, 1968	University of Central Missouri	Warrensburg, Missouri	Active	
1087	**Sigma Epsilon (Second)**	December 7, 1968	Barber–Scotia College	Concord, North Carolina	Active	
1114	**Phi Gamma**	December 16, 1968	University of North Texas	Denton, Texas	Active	(Note: Chapter formed from Alpha Mu Omega (local).)
1115	**Chi Gamma**	March 26, 1969	University of Detroit Mercy	Detroit, Michigan	Active	
1115	**Chi Gamma**	March 26, 1969	Marygrove College	Detroit, Michigan	Active	
1118	**Alpha Theta**	March 29, 1969	Arizona State University	Tempe, Arizona	Active	
1117	**Omega Gamma**	March 29, 1969	West Texas State University	Canyon, Texas	Active	
1116	**Psi Gamma**	April 1, 1969	Kent State University	Kent, Ohio	Active	
1136	**Tau Theta**	May 17, 1969	Eastern Illinois University	Charleston, Illinois	Active	
1120	**Gamma Theta**	July 3, 1969	Western Kentucky University	Bowling Green, Kentucky	Active	
1121	**Delta Theta**	September 3, 1969	Southeastern University	Washington, D.C.	Active	
1581	**Kappa Nu**	September 9, 1969	Binghamton University	Binghamton, New York	Active	
1122	**Epsilon Theta**	September 15, 1969	University of Wisconsin	Madison, Wisconsin	Active	
1123	**Zeta Theta**	September 16, 1969	Georgia State University	Atlanta, Georgia	Active	
1124	**Eta Theta**	December 5, 1969	University of Texas at Austin	Austin, Texas	Active	
1119	**Beta Theta**	December 12, 1969	Mississippi Valley State University	Itta Bena, Mississippi	Active	
1015	**Omicron (Second)**	1969–xxxx ?; December 4, 2010	Columbia University	New York City, New York	Active	
1126	**Iota Theta**	January 15, 1970	Northwest Missouri State University,	Maryville, Missouri	Active	
1126	**Iota Theta**	January 15, 1970	Missouri Western State University	Maryville, Missouri	Active	
1126	**Iota Theta**	January 15, 1970	Truman State University	Maryville, Missouri	Active	
1128	**Lambda Theta**	January 17, 1970	Shepherd University	Shepherdstown, West Virginia	Active	
1125	**Theta Theta**	February 1, 1970	East Texas A&M University	Commerce, Texas	Active	(Note: Chapter formed at Texas A&M University at Commerce, which became East Texas A&M University in 2024.)
1129	**Mu Theta**	February 1, 1970	Iowa State University	Ames, Iowa	Active	
1130	**Nu Theta**	February 11, 1970	Lawrence Institute of Technology	Detroit, Michigan	Active	
1131	**Xi Theta**	March 11, 1970	Ashland College	Ashland, Ohio	Active	
1132	**Omicron Theta**	April 10, 1970	Southern Illinois University-Carbondale	Carbondale, Illinois	Active	
1133	Pi Theta	April 10, 1970– xxxx ?	Northern Michigan University	Marquette, Michigan	Inactive	
1134	**Rho Theta**	April 25, 1970	Prairie View A&M University	Prairie View, Texas	Active	
1135	**Sigma Theta**	May 14, 1970	Voorhees College	Denmark, South Carolina	Active	
1137	**Upsilon Theta**	May 22, 1970	Lamar University	Beaumont, Texas	Active	
1142	**Alpha Beta**	May 23, 1970	Murray State University	Murray, Kentucky	Active	
1138	**Phi Theta**	August 1, 1970	Cleveland State University	Cleveland, Ohio	Active	
1139	**Chi Theta**	August 1, 1970	Florida State University	Tallahassee, Florida	Active	
1140	**Psi Theta**	August 1, 1970	University of Cincinnati	Cincinnati, Ohio	Active	
1102	**Iota Gamma (Second)**	November 8, 1970	The College of New Jersey	Trenton, New Jersey	Active	
1141	**Omega Theta**	November 11, 1970	University of Houston	Houston, Texas	Active	
1156	**Omicron Beta**	December 6, 1970	Central Michigan University	Mount Pleasant, Michigan	Active	
1143	**Beta Beta**	January 8, 1971	University of Akron	Akron, Ohio	Active	
1144	**Gamma Beta**	January 8, 1971	Paine College	Augusta, Georgia	Active	
1145	**Delta Beta**	January 15, 1971	Coppin State University	Baltimore, Maryland	Active	
1146	**Epsilon Beta**	February 4, 1971	Western Illinois University	Macomb, Illinois	Active	
1147	**Zeta Beta**	February 19, 1971	University of Dayton	Dayton, Ohio	Active	
1148	**Eta Beta**	February 22, 1971	University of Tennessee at Chattanooga	Chattanooga, Tennessee	Active	
1149	**Theta Beta**	March 1, 1971	Vanderbilt University	Nashville, Tennessee	Active	
1150	**Iota Beta**	April 1, 1971	University of Tennessee	Knoxville, Tennessee	Active	
1151	**Kappa Beta**	April 1, 1971	Rust College	Holly Springs, Mississippi	Active	
1152	**Lambda Beta**	April 20, 1971	Colorado State University	Evans, Colorado	Active	
1153	**Mu Beta**	May 4, 1971	University of Texas at Arlington	Arlington, Texas	Active	
1155	**Xi Beta**	May 12, 1971	Henderson State University	Arkadelphia, Arkansas	Active	
1154	**Nu Beta**	May 14, 1971	Marshall University	Huntington, West Virginia	Active	
1157	**Pi Beta**	June 1, 1971	Illinois State University	Normal, Illinois	Active	
1158	Rho Beta	September 15, 1971– 202x ?	McNeese State University	Lake Charles, Louisiana	Inactive	
1159	Sigma Beta	October 7, 1971– 2024	Indiana University–Purdue University Indianapolis	Indianapolis, Indiana	Inactive	(Note: In 2024, IUPUI split into Indiana University Indianapolis and Purdue University in Indianapolis.)
1160	**Tau Beta**	October 20, 1971	Ramapo College	Mahwah, New Jersey	Active	
1160	**Tau Beta**	October 20, 1971	Rutgers University–Camden	Camden, New Jersey	Active	
1161	**Upsilon Beta**	November 11, 1971	Ball State University	Muncie, Indiana	Active	
1162	**Phi Beta**	November 18, 1971	Jarvis Christian College	Hawkins, Texas	Active	
1164	**Psi Beta**	January 12, 1972	Morehead State University	Morehead, Kentucky	Active	
1163	**Chi Beta**	January 14, 1972	California State University, Long Beach	Long Beach, California	Active	
1165	**Omega Beta**	March 9, 1972	Stephen F. Austin State University	Nacogdoches, Texas	Active	
1166	Alpha Delta	March 9, 1972– xxxx ?	Dallas Baptist College	Austin, Texas	Inactive	
1167	**Beta Delta**	March 18, 1972	University of Central Arkansas	Conway, Arkansas	Active	
1168	**Gamma Delta**	April 7, 1972	University of Louisiana at Lafayette	Lafayette, Louisiana	Active	
1170	**Epsilon Delta**	April 16, 1972	University of Missouri	Columbia, Missouri	Active	
1169	**Delta Delta**	April 19, 1972	Kansas State University	Manhattan, Kansas	Active	
1171	**Zeta Delta**	April 20, 1972	Emporia State University	Emporia, Kansas	Active	
1172	Eta Delta	May 1, 1972– xxxx ?	Indiana University Northwest	Gary, Indiana	Inactive	
1173	Theta Delta	May 15, 1972– xxxx ?	Northwestern State University	Natchitoches, Louisiana	Inactive	
1174	**Iota Delta**	May 16, 1972	Northern Illinois University	Dekalb, Illinois	Active	
1175	**Kappa Delta**	May 19, 1972	University of Alabama at Birmingham	Birmingham, Alabama	Active	
1176	**Lambda Delta**	May 25, 1972	Eureka College	Eureka, Illinois	Active	
1177	**Mu Delta**	May 30, 1972	University of Iowa	Iowa City, Iowa	Active	
1178	**Nu Delta**	June 12, 1972	Columbus State University	Columbus, Georgia	Active	
1179	**Xi Delta**	September 18, 1972– xxxx ?; Fall 2021	Texas State University	San Marcos, Texas	Active	
1180	**Omicron Delta**	September 19, 1972	University of Miami	Miami, Florida	Active	
1181	**Pi Delta**	September 22, 1972	University of Oklahoma	Norman, Oklahoma	Active	
1191	**Beta Zeta**	October 28, 1972	University of Georgia	Athens, Georgia	Active	
1182	Rho Delta	February 15, 1973– 1981	Texas A&M University-Kingsville	Kingsville, Texas	Inactive	(Note: Chapter formed from Omega Psi Chi (local), established in 1971.)
1183	**Sigma Delta**	March 2, 1973	Auburn University	Auburn, Alabama	Active	
1184	**Tau Delta**	March 2, 1973	Wofford College	Spartanburg, South Carolina	Active	
1187	Chi Delta (First)	March 3, 1973– January 16, 2020	University of Maryland, College Park	College Park, Maryland	Moved	(Note: Reclassified as a graduate chapter in 2020.)
1185	**Upsilon Delta**	March 19, 1973	University of South Florida	Tampa, Florida	Active	
1188	**Psi Delta**	March 22, 1973	University of North Carolina at Chapel Hill	Chapel Hill, North Carolina	Active	
1186	**Phi Delta**	March 20, 1973	Virginia Commonwealth University	Richmond, Virginia	Active	
1189	**Omega Delta**	March 29, 1973	West Chester University	West Chester, Pennsylvania	Active	
1190	**Alpha Zeta**	April 11, 1973	Arkansas State University	State University, Arkansas	Active	
1221	**Theta Eta**	April 19, 1975	Jacksonville State University	Jacksonville, Alabama	Active	
1198	**Iota Zeta**	April 23, 1973	University of Tennessee at Martin	Martin, Tennessee	Active	
1201	**Mu Zeta**	April 25, 1973	Middle Tennessee State University	Murfreesboro, Tennessee	Active	
1192	**Gamma Zeta**	May 2, 1973	Mercer University	Macon, Georgia	Active	
1193	Delta Zeta (First)	May 21, 1973– xxxx ?	Villanova University	Villanova, Pennsylvania	Inactive, Reassigned	
1194	**Epsilon Zeta**	July 31, 1973	University of North Carolina at Charlotte	Charlotte, North Carolina	Active	
1195	**Zeta Zeta**	July 31, 1973	University of South Carolina	Columbia, South Carolina	Active	
1196	**Eta Zeta**	July 31, 1973	University of Mississippi	Oxford, Mississippi	Active	
1197	**Theta Zeta**	September 9, 1973	East Tennessee State University	Johnson City, Tennessee	Active	
1199	Kappa Zeta	September 10, 1973– xxxx ?	Southeastern Oklahoma State University	Durant, Oklahoma	Inactive	
1200	**Lambda Zeta**	September 10, 1973	University of Virginia	Charlottesville, Virginia	Active	
1203	**Xi Zeta**	September 28, 1973	University of Memphis	Memphis, Tennessee	Active	
1202	**Nu Zeta**	September 29, 1973	West Virginia University	Morgantown, West Virginia	Active	
1207	**Sigma Zeta**	November 3, 1973	University of Wisconsin at Whitewater	Whitewater, Wisconsin	Active	
1204	**Omicron Zeta**	November 5, 1973	University of Florida	Gainesville, Florida	Active	
1205	**Pi Zeta**	November 6, 1973	Baldwin Wallace College	Berea, Ohio	Active	
1206	**Rho Zeta**	November 6, 1973	Kean University	Union, New Jersey	Active	
1208	**Tau Zeta**	November 6, 1973	Rutgers University	New Brunswick, New Jersey	Active	
1209	**Upsilon Zeta**	December 11, 1973	East Carolina University	Greenville, North Carolina	Active	
1210	**Phi Zeta**	February 11, 1974	Ferris State University	Big Rapids, Michigan	Active	
1211	**Chi Zeta**	April 6, 1974	Clemson University	Clemson, South Carolina	Active	
1213	**Omega Zeta**	April 12, 1974	Duke University	Durham, North Carolina	Active	
1212	**Psi Zeta**	April 18, 1974	University of Delaware	Newark, Delaware	Active	
1215	**Beta Eta**	April 20, 1974	University of Alabama	Tuscaloosa, Alabama	Active	
1214	**Alpha Eta**	September 7, 1974	East Stroudsburg University of Pennsylvania	East Stroudsburg, Pennsylvania	Active	
1214	**Alpha Eta**	September 7, 1974	Commonwealth University-Bloomsburg	East Stroudsburg, Pennsylvania	Active	
1216	**Gamma Eta**	February 18, 1975	University of Arkansas-Fayetteville	Fayetteville, Arkansas	Active	
1217	**Delta Eta**	February 18, 1975	Southern Arkansas University	Magnolia, Arkansas	Active	
1218	**Epsilon Eta**	February 18, 1975– 2011; November 2013	Chicago State University	Chicago, Illinois	Active	
1219	Zeta Eta	April 5, 1975– xxxx ?	Paul Quinn College	Red Oak, Texas	Inactive	
1220	**Eta Eta**	April 18, 1975	Kettering University	Flint, Michigan	Active	(Note: Chapter was formed at General Motors Institute, now Kettering University.)
1220	**Eta Eta**	April 18, 1975	University of South Alabama	Flint, Michigan	Active	(Note: Chapter was formed at General Motors Institute, now Kettering University.)
1220	**Eta Eta**	April 18, 1975	University of Michigan–Flint	Flint, Michigan	Active	(Note: Chapter was formed at General Motors Institute, now Kettering University.)
1222	**Iota Eta**	July 20, 1975	New Jersey Institute of Technology	Newark, New Jersey	Active	
1222	**Iota Eta**	July 20, 1975	Rutgers University–Newark	Newark, New Jersey	Active	
1223	**Kappa Eta**	July 20, 1975	Seton Hall University	South Orange, New Jersey	Active	
1224	**Lambda Eta**	September 10, 1975	Wake Forest University	Winston-Salem, North Carolina	Active	
1225	Mu Eta	November 12, 1975– 1979	Daniel Payne College	Birmingham, Alabama	Inactive	(Note: The college closed in 1979.)
1226	**Nu Eta**	November 12, 1975	University of Southern Mississippi	Hattiesburg, Mississippi	Active	
1227	Xi Eta	November 15, 1975– xxxx ?	Texas Tech University	Lubbock, Texas	Inactive	
1228	**Omicron Eta**	November 15, 1975	University of Connecticut	Storrs, Connecticut	Active	
1229	**Pi Eta**	March 22, 1976	Lewis University	Romeoville, Illinois	Active	
1230	**Rho Eta**	April 10, 1976	University of Kansas	Lawrence, Kansas	Active	
1231	**Sigma Eta**	April 10, 1976	University of California, Riverside	Riverside, California	Active	
1234	**Phi Eta**	April 10, 1976	University of Louisville	Louisville, Kentucky	Active	
1232	**Tau Eta**	April 15, 1976	Drake University	Des Moines, Iowa	Active	
1233	**Upsilon Eta**	May 11, 1976	Lander College	Greenwood, South Carolina	Active	
1235	**Chi Eta**	July 1, 1976	University of Northern Iowa	Cedar Falls, Iowa	Active	
1236	**Psi Eta**	July 1, 1976	North Carolina A&T State University	Greensboro, North Carolina	Active	
1238	**Alpha Kappa**	August 15, 1976	Marquette University	Milwaukee, Wisconsin	Active	
1237	**Omega Eta**	August 15, 1976	Augusta State University	Augusta, Georgia	Active	
1239	**Beta Kappa**	October 13, 1976	Frostburg State University	Frostburg, Maryland	Active	
1626	**Eta Xi**	October 13, 1976	Mississippi State University	Starkville, Mississippi	Active	
1241	**Delta Kappa**	November 20, 1976	Georgia Institute of Technology	Atlanta, Georgia	Active	
1242	**Epsilon Kappa**	November 20, 1976	Clarion University of Pennsylvania	Clarion, Pennsylvania	Active	
1243	**Zeta Kappa**	November 20, 1976	University of South Alabama	Mobile, Alabama	Active	
1629	Kappa Xi	November 20, 1976– xxxx ?	University of Nevada, Las Vegas	Las Vegas, Nevada	Inactive	
1247	**Kappa Kappa**	December 19, 1976	University of West Georgia	Carrollton, Georgia	Active	
1244	Eta Kappa (First)	March 12, 1977– April 26, 2021	Millersville University of Pennsylvania	Millersville, Pennsylvania	Moved	(Note: Reclassified as a graduate chapter in Lancaster, Pennsylvania.)
1245	**Theta Kappa**	March 12, 1977– June 17, 2016; May 31, 2021	Louisiana State University	Baton Rouge, Louisiana	Active	(Note: The university closed the chapter in 2016 for hazing.)
1249	**Mu Kappa**	May 1, 1977	California Polytechnic State University, San Luis Obispo	San Luis Obispo, California	Active	
1250	Nu Kappa	August 31, 1977– 20xx ?	Southern Methodist University	University Park, Texas	Inactive	
1251	**Xi Kappa**	August 31, 1977	PennWest California	California, Pennsylvania	Active	
1270	**Iota Lambda**	December 17, 1977	University of North Carolina at Wilmington	Wilmington, North Carolina	Active	
1273	Mu Lambda	December 17, 1977– 2022	University of Louisiana-Monroe	Monroe, Louisiana	Inactive	
1638	**Tau Xi**	December 17, 1977– xxxx ? ; October 2, 2006	University of Cincinnati	Cincinnati, Ohio	Active	
1253	**Pi Kappa**	March 1, 1978	University of Arkansas at Little Rock	Little Rock, Arkansas	Active	
1643	**Omega Xi**	March 10, 1978	Lehigh University	Bethlehem, Pennsylvania	Active	
1643	**Omega Xi**	March 10, 1978	Albright College	Bethlehem, Pennsylvania	Active	
1643	**Omega Xi**	March 10, 1978	Delaware Valley University	Bethlehem, Pennsylvania	Active	
1643	**Omega Xi**	March 10, 1978	Kutztown University of Pennsylvania	Bethlehem, Pennsylvania	Active	
1643	**Omega Xi**	March 10, 1978	Lafayette College	Bethlehem, Pennsylvania	Active	
1643	**Omega Xi**	March 10, 1978	Moravian University	Bethlehem, Pennsylvania	Active	
1643	**Omega Xi**	March 10, 1978	Muhlenberg College	Bethlehem, Pennsylvania	Active	
1254	**Rho Kappa**	March 10, 1978	Austin Peay State University	Clarksville, Tennessee	Active	
1255	Sigma Kappa	March 10, 1978– 20xx ?	University of Central Oklahoma	Edmond, Oklahoma	Inactive	
1256	**Tau Kappa**	March 27, 1978	statewide undergraduate chapter	Omaha, Nebraska	Active	
1258	**Phi Kappa**	September 15, 1978	Rowan University	Glassboro, New Jersey	Active	
1257	**Upsilon Kappa**	October 1, 1978	University of Wisconsin-Oshkosh	Oshkosh, Wisconsin	Active	
1283	**Chi Lambda**	March 1, 1979	Tennessee Tech University	Cookeville, Tennessee	Active	
1260	**Psi Kappa**	March 9, 1979	Winthrop University	Rock Hill, South Carolina	Active	
1261	Omega Kappa	March 9, 1979– xxxx ?	Nicholls State University	Thibodaux, Louisiana	Inactive	
1274	Nu Lambda	March 15, 1980– xxxx ?	University of Wisconsin–Milwaukee	Milwaukee, Wisconsin	Inactive	
1262	Alpha Lambda	August 6, 1979– xxxx ?	Southern University at New Orleans	New Orleans, Louisiana	Inactive	
1263	**Beta Lambda**	August 6, 1979	University of South Carolina Aiken	Aiken, South Carolina	Active	
1264	**Gamma Lambda**	August 6, 1979	West Virginia University Institute of Technology	Montgomery, West Virginia	Active	
1266	**Epsilon Lambda**	August 6, 1979	Morris College	Sumter, South Carolina	Active	
1267	Zeta Lambda	August 6, 1979– xxxx ?	University of Washington	Seattle, Washington	Inactive	
1268	**Eta Lambda**	August 6, 1979	Virginia Tech	Blacksburg, Virginia	Active	
1269	**Theta Lambda**	September 22, 1979	Western Carolina University	Cullowhee, North Carolina	Active	
1276	Omicron Lambda	February 20, 1980– 202x ?	Oklahoma State University-Stillwater	Stillwater, Oklahoma	Inactive	
1277	Pi Lambda	February 28, 1980– xxxx ?	University of Texas at El Paso	El Paso, Texas	Inactive	
1271	**Kappa Lambda**	March 15, 1980	North Carolina State University	Raleigh, North Carolina	Active	
1272	**Lambda Lambda**	March 15, 1980	Francis Marion University	Florence, South Carolina	Active	
1275	**Xi Lambda**	March 15, 1980	Shippensburg University	Shippensburg, Pennsylvania	Active	
1278	**Rho Lambda**	April 26, 1980	University of Kentucky	Lexington, Kentucky	Active	
1279	**Sigma Lambda**	September 13, 1980	Texas Christian University	Fort Worth, Texas	Active	
1280	**Tau Lambda**	September 13, 1980	Old Dominion University	Norfolk, Virginia	Active	
1281	**Upsilon Lambda**	September 29, 1980	University of Maryland, Baltimore County	Baltimore County, Maryland	Active	
1282	**Phi Lambda**	November 3, 1980	California State University, Fullerton	Fullerton, California	Active	(Note: Originally chartered at California State University, Fullerton.)
1282	**Phi Lambda**	November 3, 1980	California State Polytechnic University, Pomona	Fullerton, California	Active	(Note: Originally chartered at California State University, Fullerton.)
1282	**Phi Lambda**	November 3, 1980	Chapman University	Fullerton, California	Active	(Note: Originally chartered at California State University, Fullerton.)
1282	**Phi Lambda**	November 3, 1980	Claremont Colleges	Fullerton, California	Active	(Note: Originally chartered at California State University, Fullerton.)
1282	**Phi Lambda**	November 3, 1980	University of California, Irvine	Fullerton, California	Active	(Note: Originally chartered at California State University, Fullerton.)
1282	**Phi Lambda**	November 3, 1980	University of La Verne	Fullerton, California	Active	(Note: Originally chartered at California State University, Fullerton.)
1284	**Psi Lambda**	December 26, 1980	Stockton University	Galloway Township, New Jersey	Active	
1667	**Chi Alpha Alpha**	December 30, 1980	Washington State University	Pullman, Washington	Active	
1286	**Alpha Mu**	August 11, 1981	Stanford University	Stanford, California	Active	
1287	**Beta Mu**	August 11, 1981	College of Charleston	Charleston, South Carolina	Active	
1290	**Epsilon Mu**	February 13, 1982	University of California, Berkeley	Berkeley, California	Active	
1288	**Gamma Mu**	June 25, 1982	Indiana University of Pennsylvania	Indiana, Pennsylvania	Active	
1289	**Delta Mu**	June 25, 1982	Cornell University	Ithaca, New York	Active	
1677	Theta Beta Beta	June 25, 1982-202x ?	Dartmouth College	Hanover, New Hampshire	Inactive	
1292	**Eta Mu**	July 27, 1982	Sam Houston State University	Huntsville, Texas	Active	
1293	**Theta Mu**	February 15, 1983– xxxx ?; 20xx ?	University of New Orleans	New Orleans, Louisiana	Active	
1294	**Iota Mu**	March 27, 1983	California State University, Sacramento	Sacramento, California	Active	
1294	**Iota Mu**	March 27, 1983	California State University, Chico	Sacramento, California	Active	
1294	**Iota Mu**	March 27, 1983	University of California, Davis	Sacramento, California	Active	
1295	Kappa Mu	March 27, 1983– 1988	University of Illinois at Chicago	Chicago, Illinois	Inactive	
1296	**Lambda Mu**	March 27, 1983	American Baptist College	Nashville, Tennessee	Active	(Note: Chapter formed at the American Baptist Theological Seminary, now called American Baptist College.)
1297	**Mu Mu**	March 27, 1983	University of Missouri–Kansas City	Kansas City, Missouri	Active	
1928	Nu Mu	March 27, 1983– xxxx ?	University of the Pacific	Stockton, California	Inactive	
1689	**Upsilon Beta Beta**	April 4, 1983	Coastal Carolina University	Conway, South Carolina	Active	
1302	**Rho Mu**	April 16, 1983	University of Arkansas at Monticello	Monticello, Arkansas	Active	
1299	Xi Mu	June 1, 1983	University of California, Santa Barbara	Isla Vista, California	Inactive	
1300	Omicron Mu (First)	August 15, 1983 – 1985	Weber State University	Ogden, Utah	Inactive	
1301	**Pi Mu**	August 15, 1983	San Diego State University	San Diego, California	Active	
1303	**Sigma Mu**	May 18, 1984	Elon University	Elon, North Carolina	Active	
1305	**Upsilon Mu**	June 27, 1984	State University of New York at Old Westbury	Old Westbury, New York	Active	
1304	**Tau Mu**	July 15, 1984	Fairleigh Dickinson University	Teaneck, New Jersey	Active	
1306	**Phi Mu**	September 29, 1984	Missouri University of Science and Technology	Rolla, Missouri	Active	
1307	**Chi Mu**	December 29, 1984	University of North Carolina at Pembroke	Pembroke, North Carolina	Active	
1308	**Psi Mu**	December 29, 1984	Appalachian State University	Boone, North Carolina	Active	
1309	**Omega Mu**	July 1, 1985	Georgia College & State University	Milledgeville, Georgia	Active	
1310	**Alpha Delta Delta**	December 7, 1985	Louisiana Tech University	Ruston, Louisiana	Active	
1311	**Beta Delta Delta**	December 7, 1985	James Madison University	Harrisonburg, Virginia	Active	
1312	**Gamma Delta Delta**	February 28, 1987	University of Massachusetts Amherst	Amherst, Massachusetts	Active	
1313	**Delta Delta Delta**	February 28, 1987	Georgia Southwestern State University	Americus, Georgia	Active	
1283	**Chi Lambda**	April 4, 1987	University of North Carolina at Pembroke	Pembroke, North Carolina	Active	
1315	**Zeta Delta Delta**	December 5, 1987	Georgia Southern University	Statesboro, Georgia	Active	
1314	**Epsilon Delta Delta**	December 6, 1987	Saginaw Valley State University	Saginaw, Michigan	Active	
1316	**Eta Delta Delta**	July 29, 1988	George Mason University	Fairfax County, Virginia	Active	
1317	**Theta Delta Delta**	July 29, 1988	Mississippi State University	Starkville, Mississippi	Active	
1318	**Iota Delta Delta**	December 9, 1988	Southeast Missouri State University	Cape Girardeau, Missouri	Active	
1319	**Kappa Delta Delta**	February 17, 1990	Iowa Wesleyan University	Mount Pleasant, Iowa	Active	
1322	**Nu Delta Delta**	May 29, 1992	Texas A&M University-College Station	College Station, Texas	Active	
1323	Xi Delta Delta	October 28, 1992– xxxx ?	Michigan Technological University	Houghton, Michigan	Inactive	
1324	Omicron Delta Delta	December 5, 1992	William Paterson University	Wayne, New Jersey	Active	
1325	**Pi Delta Delta**	July 23, 1994	Emory University	Atlanta, Georgia	Active	
1592	**Phi Nu (Second)**	1994	United States Military Academy	West Point, New York	Active	(Note: Originally a graduate chapter, Phi Nu expanded and added on an undergraduate attachment at West Point in 1994.)
1326	**Rho Delta Delta**	July 12, 1995	Troy University	Troy, Alabama	Active	
1327	**Sigma Delta Delta**	December 7, 1995	Florida Atlantic University	Boca Raton, Florida	Active	
1328	**Tau Delta Delta**	June 8, 1996	Valdosta State University	Valdosta, Georgia	Active	
1329	**Upsilon Delta Delta**	July 12, 1997	Delta State University	Cleveland, Mississippi	Active	
1330	**Phi Delta Delta**	July 11, 1998	Cumberland University	Lebanon, Tennessee	Active	
1331	**Chi Delta Delta**	December 5, 1998	Baylor University	Waco, Texas	Active	
1332	**Psi Delta Delta**	December 21, 2001	Charleston Southern University	Charleston, South Carolina	Active	
1333	**Omega Delta Delta**	June 6, 2003	Temple University	Philadelphia, Pennsylvania	Active	
1334	**Alpha Delta Epsilon**	January 22, 2004	Southeastern Louisiana University	Hammond, Louisiana	Active	
1335	**Alpha Delta Zeta**	July 22, 2004	University of North Carolina at Greensboro	Greensboro, North Carolina	Active	
1336	**Alpha Delta Eta**	November 1, 2004	Florida International University	Miami, Florida	Active	
1337	**Alpha Delta Theta**	May 2, 2005	Arkansas Tech University	Russellville, Arkansas	Active	
1338	**Chi Tau Tau**	September 1, 2005	University of Central Florida	Orlando, Florida	Active	
1339	**Alpha Delta Iota**	December 4, 2005	University of West Alabama	Livingston, Alabama	Active	
1340	**Alpha Delta Kappa**	July 21, 2006	Coastal Carolina University	Conway, South Carolina	Inactive	
1341	**Alpha Delta Lambda**	February 1, 2008	University of Texas at San Antonio	San Antonio, Texas	Active	
1342	**Alpha Delta Mu**	June 6, 2008	University of North Florida	Jacksonville, Florida	Active	
1343	**Alpha Delta Nu**	June 6, 2008	Kennesaw State University	Kennesaw, Georgia	Active	
1345	**Alpha Delta Omicron**	July 25, 2009	Louisiana State University Shreveport	Shreveport, Louisiana	Active	
1346	**Alpha Delta Pi**	July 25, 2009	Arkansas Baptist College	Little Rock, Arkansas	Active	
1347	**Alpha Delta Rho**	May 6, 2010	Southern Polytechnic State University	Marietta, Georgia	Active	
1348	**Alpha Delta Sigma**	September 18, 2010	College of William & Mary	Williamsburg, Virginia	Active	
1349	**Alpha Delta Tau**	November 16, 2011	University of South Carolina Upstate	Spartanburg, South Carolina	Active	
1350	**Alpha Delta Upsilon**	April 17, 2012	Chowan University	Murfreesboro, North Carolina	Active	
1351	**Alpha Delta Phi**	January 24, 2013	Montclair State University	Montclair, New Jersey	Active	
1352	**Alpha Delta Chi**	January 16, 2014	Newberry College	Newberry, South Carolina	Active	
1353	**Alpha Delta Psi**	July 11, 2015	Lenoir-Rhyne University	Hickory, North Carolina	Active	
1354	**Alpha Delta Omega**	July 11, 2015	Presbyterian College	Clinton, South Carolina	Active	
1356	**Alpha Delta Beta**	May 11, 2016	University of North Alabama	Florence, Alabama	Active	
1358	**Alpha Epsilon Alpha**	January 20, 2018	Methodist University	Hope Mills, North Carolina	Active	
1359	**Alpha Epsilon Beta**	March 27, 2018	University of the Bahamas	Nassau, The Bahamas	Active	
1499	**Phi Upsilon (Second)**	2018	Monmouth University	West Long Branch, New Jersey	Active	
1360	**Alpha Epsilon Gamma**	January 24, 2019	Bethel University	Brownsville, Tennessee	Active	
1361	**Alpha Epsilon Delta**	January 24, 2019	Wingate University	Wingate, North Carolina	Active	
1362	**Alpha Epsilon Zeta**	February 1, 2021	Bloomfield College	Bloomfield, New Jersey	Active	
1362	**Alpha Epsilon Zeta**	February 1, 2021	Caldwell University	Caldwell, New Jersey	Active	
1193	**Delta Zeta (Second)**	November 13, 2023	Stony Brook University	Stony Brook, New York	Active	

== Graduate chapters ==
The first graduate chapter of Omega Psi Phi was chartered in Norfolk, Virginia, on June 1, 1920. In 1922, Omega Psi Phi began using the suffix "Omega" to designate graduate chapters. In 1923, the fraternity decided that all of its graduate chapters would have names ending in Omega. As a result, the existing graduate chapters with single-letter names were renamed.

The following list of graduate chapters is ordered by charter date, with active chapters indicated in bold and inactive chapters in italics.

Number	Chapter	Charter date and range	Location	Status	Ref.
1011	Lambda (First) (see **Lambda Omega**)	June 1, 1920 – May 3, 1923	Norfolk, Virginia	Renamed, Reassigned	(Note: Chapter was formed as Lambda in 1920 and was renamed Lambda Omega in 1923.)
1009	Iota (First)	August 17, 1920 – May 1922	Atlantic City, New Jersey	Reassigned	
1012	Mu (First) (see **Mu Omega**)	October 1, 1920 – May 23, 1923	Philadelphia, Pennsylvania	Renamed, Reassigned	(Note: Chapter formed as Mu in 1920 and changed to Mu Omega in 1923.)
1020	Upsilon (First) (see **Upsilon Omega**)	January 21, 1921 – April 1, 1923	St. Louis, Missouri	Renamed, Reassigned	(Note: Chapter formed as Upsilon in 1921 and was renamed Upsilon Omega in 1923.)
1018	Sigma (First) (see **Sigma Omega**)	October 1, 1921 – December 15, 1923	Chicago, Illinois	Renamed, Reassigned	(Note: Chapter was formed as Sigma in 1921 and was renamed Sigma Omega in 1923.)
1379	**Pi Omega**	November 17, 1921	Baltimore, Maryland	Active	
1364	**Alpha Omega**	October 1, 1922	Washington, D.C.	Active	
1365	**Beta Omega**	October 1, 1922	Kansas City, Missouri	Active	
1371	**Theta Omega**	December 12, 1922	Louisville, Kentucky	Active	
1370	**Eta Omega**	1923	Atlanta, Georgia	Active	(Note: Chapter was originally part of Eta (First), consisting of various colleges, universities, and graduate members in the state of Georgia. The chapter dissolved as its various institutions formed their own chapters, eventually leaving only graduate members. Consistent with the fraternity's policy of identifying graduate chapters with the suffix "Omega", the chapter was renamed Eta Omega in 1923.)
1376	**Nu Omega**	January 24, 1923	Detroit, Michigan	Active	
1373	**Kappa Omega**	January 25, 1923	Harrisburg, Pennsylvania	Active	
1384	**Phi Omega**	February 24, 1923	Buffalo, New York	Active	
1383	**Upsilon Omega** (see Upsilon First)	April 1, 1923	St. Louis, Missouri	Active	
1368	**Epsilon Omega**	April 20, 1923	Orangeburg, South Carolina	Active	
1374	**Lambda Omega** (see Lambda First)	May 3, 1923	Norfolk, Virginia	Active	
1375	**Mu Omega** (see Mu First)	May 23, 1923	Philadelphia, Pennsylvania	Active	
1380	**Rho Omega**	September 2, 1923	Shreveport, Louisiana	Active	
1366	**Gamma Omega**	October 1, 1923	Lynchburg, Virginia	Active	
1369	**Zeta Omega**	October 1, 1923	Cleveland, Ohio	Active	
1377	**Xi Omega**	October 1, 1923	Tulsa, Oklahoma	Active	
1378	**Omicron Omega**	October 1, 1923	Lawrenceville, Virginia	Active	
1381	**Sigma Omega** (see Sigma First)	October 1, 1923	Chicago, Illinois	Active	
1382	**Tau Omega**	October 1, 1923	Greensboro, North Carolina	Active	
1372	**Iota Omega**	December 3, 1923	Tuskegee, Alabama	Active	
1367	**Delta Omega**	December 14, 1923	Petersburg, Virginia	Active	
1387	**Alpha Phi**	October 1, 1924	Birmingham, Alabama	Active	
1385	**Chi Omega**	December 15, 1924	Tallahassee, Florida	Active	
1388	**Beta Phi**	December 15, 1924	Durham, North Carolina	Active	
1391	**Epsilon Phi**	April 1, 1925	Memphis, Tennessee	Active	
1392	**Zeta Phi**	April 29, 1925	Indianapolis, Indiana	Active	
1394	**Theta Phi**	May 11, 1925	Jacksonville, Florida	Active	
1390	**Delta Phi**	May 14, 1925	Lawrence, Kansas	Active	
1393	**Eta Phi**	July 1, 1925	Boston, Massachusetts	Active	
1386	**Psi Omega**	August 9, 1925	Augusta, Georgia	Active	
1389	**Gamma Phi**	October 1, 1925	Nashville, Tennessee	Active	
1395	**Iota Phi**	October 1, 1925	Pittsburgh, Pennsylvania	Active	
1397	**Lambda Phi**	October 1, 1926	Macon, Georgia	Active	
1398	**Mu Phi**	October 1, 1926	Savannah, Georgia	Active	
1399	**Nu Phi**	October 1, 1926	Houston, Texas	Active	
1400	**Xi Phi**	November 11, 1926	Harlem, New York City, New York	Active	
1401	**Omicron Phi**	November 17, 1926	Columbia, South Carolina	Active	
1402	**Pi Phi**	January 27, 1927	Charlotte, North Carolina	Active	
1405	**Tau Phi**	March 15, 1927	Pine Bluff, Arkansas	Active	
1404	**Sigma Phi**	April 16, 1927	Montgomery, Alabama	Active	
1403	**Rho Phi**	October 1, 1927	New Orleans, Louisiana	Active	
1407	**Phi Phi**	October 1, 1927	Richmond, Virginia	Active	
1406	**Upsilon Phi**	October 27, 1927	Newark, New Jersey	Active	
1408	**Chi Phi**	December 27, 1927	Denver, Colorado	Active	
1409	**Psi Phi**	January 23, 1932	Winston-Salem, North Carolina	Active	
1410	**Alpha Alpha**	October 1, 1932	Newport News, Virginia	Active	
1414	**Epsilon Alpha**	October 1, 1932	Fort Worth, Texas	Active	
1412	**Gamma Alpha**	April 4, 1933	Roanoke Valley, Virginia	Active	
1411	**Beta Alpha**	October 1, 1933	Jackson, Mississippi	Active	
1413	**Delta Alpha**	June 1, 1934	Dayton, Ohio	Active	
1415	**Zeta Alpha**	October 1, 1934	Henderson, North Carolina	Active	
1416	**Eta Alpha**	October 1, 1934	Jefferson City, Missouri	Active	
1418	**Iota Alpha**	April 19, 1935	Knoxville, Tennessee	Active	
1419	**Kappa Alpha**	May 9, 1935	Rock Hill, South Carolina	Active	
1417	**Theta Alpha**	October 1, 1935	Dallas, Texas	Active	
1420	**Lambda Alpha**	May 8, 1936	Baton Rouge, Louisiana	Active	
1423	**Xi Alpha**	October 1, 1936	Institute, West Virginia	Active	
1424	**Omicron Alpha**	December 1, 1936	Wilmington, North Carolina	Active	
1422	**Nu Alpha**	December 5, 1936	Plymouth, North Carolina	Active	
1425	**Pi Alpha**	January 28, 1938	Princess Anne, Maryland	Active	
1426	**Rho Alpha**	March 15, 1938	Mobile, Alabama	Active	
1421	**Mu Alpha**	August 6, 1938	Charleston, South Carolina	Active	
1427	**Sigma Alpha**	March 13, 1939	Miami, Florida	Active	
1428	**Tau Alpha**	October 1, 1939	Salisbury, North Carolina	Active	
1429	**Upsilon Alpha**	October 1, 1939	Atlantic City, New Jersey	Active	
1431	**Chi Alpha**	October 1, 1939	Charleston, West Virginia	Active	
1434	**Beta Iota**	June 25, 1940	Cincinnati, Ohio	Active	
1433	**Alpha Iota**	October 1, 1940	Suffolk, Virginia	Active	
1435	**Gamma Iota**	October 1, 1940	Sumter, South Carolina	Active	
1435	**Gamma Iota**	October 1, 1940	Darlington, South Carolina	Active	
1430	**Phi Alpha**	October 3, 1940	Greer, South Carolina	Active	
1432	**Psi Alpha**	November 1, 1940	San Antonio, Texas	Active	
1436	**Delta Iota**	March 27, 1941	Elizabeth City, North Carolina	Active	
1437	**Epsilon Iota**	April 23, 1941	Austin, Texas	Active	
1438	**Zeta Iota**	October 1, 1941	Portsmouth, Virginia	Active	
1439	**Eta Iota**	April 10, 1942	Oklahoma City, Oklahoma	Active	
1441	**Iota Iota**	May 31, 1944	Raleigh, North Carolina	Active	
1440	**Theta Iota**	October 1, 1944	Jackson, Tennessee	Active	
1443	**Lambda Iota**	May 14, 1945	Columbus, Georgia	Active	
1444	**Mu Iota**	June 1, 1945	Columbus, Ohio	Active	
1442	**Kappa Iota**	October 1, 1945	Chattanooga, Tennessee	Active	
1445	**Nu Iota**	October 1, 1945	Marshall, Texas	Active	
1450	**Sigma Iota**	May 14, 1946	Oakland, California	Active	
1448	**Pi Iota**	June 15, 1946	Tampa, Florida	Active	
1451	**Tau Iota**	June 29, 1946	Hartford, Connecticut	Active	
1447	**Omicron Iota**	October 1, 1946	New Rochelle, New York	Active	
1449	**Rho Iota**	October 1, 1946	Danville, Virginia	Active	
1453	**Phi Iota**	October 1, 1946	Phoenix, Arizona	Active	
1452	**Upsilon Iota**	October 21, 1946	Langston, Oklahoma	Active	
1454	**Chi Iota**	November 16, 1946	Florence, South Carolina	Active	
1455	**Psi Iota**	November 16, 1946	Dover, Delaware	Active	
1456	**Alpha Omicron**	November 26, 1946	Rocky Mount, North Carolina	Active	
1458	**Gamma Omicron**	December 2, 1946	Minden, Louisiana	Active	
1466	**Lambda Omicron**	December 16, 1946	Los Angeles, California	Active	
1471	**Pi Omicron**	December 17, 1946	Little Rock, Arkansas	Active	
1460	Epsilon Omicron	February 16, 1947 – xxxx ?	Wichita Falls, Texas	Inactive	
1462	**Eta Omicron**	April 11, 1947	Albany, Georgia	Active	
1467	**Mu Omicron**	August 3, 1947	Des Moines, Iowa	Active	
1477	**Chi Omicron**	September 9, 1947	New Haven, Connecticut	Active	
1461	**Zeta Omicron**	October 1, 1947	Hampton, Virginia	Active	
1468	**Nu Omicron**	October 1, 1947	Queens, New York	Active	
1470	**Omicron Omicron**	March 21, 1948	Daytona Beach, Florida	Active	
1469	**Xi Omicron**	May 30, 1948	Huntsville, Alabama	Active	
1465	**Kappa Omicron**	September 25, 1948	New York City, New York	Active	
1459	**Delta Omicron**	October 1, 1948	Beaumont, Texas	Active	
1464	**Iota Omicron**	October 1, 1948	Clarksdale, Mississippi	Active	
1472	**Rho Omicron**	October 1, 1948	New Iberia, Louisiana	Active	
1473	**Sigma Omicron**	October 1, 1948	Tyler, Texas	Active	
1474	**Tau Omicron**	October 1, 1948	Martinsville, Virginia	Active	(Note: Chapter originally covered both Martinsville and Danville. The latter became the Rho Iota chapter in 1977.)
1478	**Psi Omicron**	June 15, 1949	Youngstown, Ohio	Active	
1479	**Alpha Upsilon**	October 1, 1949	Brooklyn, New York	Active	
1476	**Phi Omicron**	November 1, 1949	San Diego, California	Active	
1480	**Beta Upsilon**	December 28, 1949	Omaha, Nebraska	Active	
1481	**Gamma Upsilon**	December 29, 1949	Wichita, Kansas	Active	
1488	**Kappa Upsilon**	January 28, 1950	West Palm Beach, Florida	Active	
1482	**Delta Upsilon**	January 30, 1950	Trenton, New Jersey	Active	
1483	**Epsilon Upsilon**	March 8, 1950	Gastonia, North Carolina	Active	
1484	**Zeta Upsilon**	July 10, 1950	Renton, Washington	Active	
1485	**Eta Upsilon**	July 19, 1950	Bettendorf, Iowa	Active	
1486	**Theta Upsilon**	November 28, 1950	Texarkana, Texas	Active	
1489	**Lambda Upsilon**	February 15, 1951	Paterson, New Jersey	Active	
1490	Mu Upsilon	April 21, 1951 – xxxx ?	Denmark, South Carolina	Inactive	
1491	**Nu Upsilon**	August 18, 1951	Wilmington, Delaware	Active	
1492	**Xi Upsilon**	February 7, 1952	Port Arthur, Texas	Active	
1493	**Omicron Upsilon**	March 13, 1952	Waco, Texas	Active	
1498	**Upsilon Upsilon**	May 1, 1952	Skelton, West Virginia	Active	
1496	**Sigma Upsilon**	May 17, 1952	Lansing, Michigan	Active	
1497	**Tau Upsilon**	May 17, 1952	Carbondale, Illinois	Active	
1499	Phi Upsilon (First)	June 15, 1952 – 2018	Asbury Park, New Jersey	Moved	(Note: The chapter initiated their first undergraduate brother at Monmouth University on March 22, 1997. On January 21, 2018, Phi Upsilon reorganized an undergraduate colony.)
1499	Phi Upsilon (First)	June 15, 1952 – 2018	Neptune Township, New Jersey	Moved	(Note: The chapter initiated their first undergraduate brother at Monmouth University on March 22, 1997. On January 21, 2018, Phi Upsilon reorganized an undergraduate colony.)
1499	Phi Upsilon (First)	June 15, 1952 – 2018	West Long Branch, New Jersey	Moved	(Note: The chapter initiated their first undergraduate brother at Monmouth University on March 22, 1997. On January 21, 2018, Phi Upsilon reorganized an undergraduate colony.)
1501	**Psi Upsilon**	July 5, 1952	Lawton, Oklahoma	Active	
1500	**Chi Upsilon**	July 15, 1952	Camden, New Jersey	Active	
1487	**Iota Upsilon**	July 17, 1952	D'Iberville, Mississippi	Active	
1495	**Rho Upsilon**	March 23, 1953	Bridgeport, Connecticut	Active	
1396	**Kappa Phi**	April 15, 1953	Milwaukee, Wisconsin	Active	
1502	**Alpha Chi**	July 7, 1953	Gary, Indiana	Active	
1503	**Beta Chi**	October 2, 1953	Fayetteville, North Carolina	Active	
1504	**Gamma Chi**	November 20, 1953	Corpus Christi, Texas	Active	
1494	**Pi Upsilon**	February 17, 1954	Hawkins, Texas	Active	
1505	**Delta Chi**	April 1, 1954	Springfield, Massachusetts	Active	
1506	**Epsilon Chi**	April 1, 1954	Alexandria, Louisiana	Active	
1507	**Zeta Chi**	April 26, 1954	Fort Lauderdale, Florida	Active	
1446	**Xi Iota**	July 1, 1954	Charlottesville, Virginia	Active	
1475	**Upsilon Omicron**	July 10, 1954	Asheville, North Carolina	Active	
1516	**Omicron Chi**	April 7, 1955	Plainfield, New Jersey	Active	
1509	**Theta Chi**	February 1, 1955	Prairie View, Texas	Active	
1510	**Iota Chi**	February 1, 1955	Cambridge, Massachusetts	Active	
1511	**Kappa Chi**	March 1, 1955	Magnolia, Arkansas	Active	
1508	**Eta Chi**	April 1, 1955	Longview, Texas	Active	
1513	**Mu Chi**	April 5, 1955	Fairborn, Ohio	Active	
1514	**Nu Chi**	April 10, 1955	East St. Louis, Illinois	Active	
1515	**Xi Chi**	May 1, 1955	Akron, Ohio	Active	
1518	**Rho Chi**	June 1, 1955	Lake Charles, Louisiana	Active	
1517	**Pi Chi**	July 1, 1955	San Francisco, California	Active	
1463	**Theta Omicron**	July 27, 1955	Rochester, New York	Active	
1519	**Sigma Chi**	August 24, 1955	Reidsville, North Carolina	Active	
1520	**Tau Chi**	December 1, 1955	Accra, Ghana	Active	
1512	**Lambda Chi**	February 4, 1956	Amarillo, Texas	Active	
1521	**Upsilon Chi**	February 4, 1956	Bentonville, Arkansas	Active	
1522	**Phi Chi**	March 10, 1956	Concord, North Carolina	Active	
1524	**Psi Chi**	May 29, 1956	Ocala, Florida	Active	
1525	**Omega Chi**	January 1, 1957	Selma, Alabama	Active	
1526	**Alpha Tau**	April 1, 1957	Tuscaloosa, Alabama	Active	
1527	**Beta Tau**	April 1, 1957	Mullins, South Carolina	Active	
1531	**Zeta Tau**	September 1, 1957	Pasadena, California	Active	
1532	**Eta Tau**	October 1, 1957	Gibson, Mississippi	Active	
1528	**Gamma Tau**	December 31, 1957	Leesburg, Florida	Active	
1523	**Chi Chi**	February 26, 1958	Camden, South Carolina	Active	
1530	Epsilon Tau	May 1, 1958 – xxxx ?	Lubbock, Texas	Inactive	
1529	**Delta Tau**	May 5, 1958	Plaquemine, Louisiana	Active	
1533	**Theta Tau**	March 15, 1959	Anniston, Alabama	Active	
1534	**Iota Tau**	April 25, 1959	Georgetown, South Carolina	Active	
1535	**Kappa Tau**	June 20, 1959	Canton, Ohio	Active	
1536	**Lambda Tau**	October 15, 1959	Brunswick, Georgia	Active	
1537	**Mu Tau**	November 15, 1959	Monroe, Louisiana	Active	
1538	**Nu Tau**	March 5, 1960	Albany, New York	Active	
1539	**Xi Tau**	April 6, 1960	Maumee, Ohio	Active	
1540	**Omicron Tau**	October 10, 1960	Fort Pierce, Florida	Active	
1541	**Pi Tau**	November 11, 1960	Grambling, Louisiana	Active	
1544	**Tau Tau**	February 3, 1961	Los Angeles, California	Active	
1542	**Rho Tau**	February 6, 1961	Gurnee, Illinois	Active	
1543	**Sigma Tau**	February 10, 1961	Fort Bliss, Texas	Active	
1545	**Upsilon Tau**	March 19, 1961	Poughkeepsie, New York	Active	
1546	**Phi Tau**	June 1, 1961	Johnson City, Tennessee	Active	
1547	**Chi Tau**	January 8, 1962	Orlando, Florida	Active	
1553	**Epsilon Rho**	March 9, 1962	St. Paul, Minnesota	Active	
1549	**Alpha Rho**	March 15, 1962	Union City, California	Active	
1551	**Gamma Rho**	April 14, 1962	New Orleans, Louisiana	Active	
1550	**Beta Rho**	April 18, 1962	Itta Bena, Mississippi	Active	
1552	**Delta Rho**	April 29, 1962	Kingstree, South Carolina	Active	
1554	**Zeta Rho**	June 11, 1962	Los Angeles, California	Active	
1556	**Theta Rho**	August 15, 1962– 1972; April 13, 1973	Frankfurt, Hesse, Germany	Active	
1555	**Eta Rho**	September 11, 1962	St. Petersburg, Florida	Active	
1548	**Psi Tau**	October 1, 1962	Lexington, Kentucky	Active	
1557	**Iota Rho**	June 1, 1963	Odessa, Texas	Active	
1558	**Kappa Rho**	October 10, 1963	Clinton, North Carolina	Active	
1559	**Lambda Rho**	March 1, 1964	Waterbury, Connecticut	Active	
1560	**Mu Rho**	March 1, 1964	Annapolis, Maryland	Active	
1561	**Nu Rho**	April 1, 1964	Albuquerque, New Mexico	Active	
1562	**Xi Rho**	April 1, 1964	West Memphis, Arkansas	Active	
1563	**Omicron Rho**	May 1, 1964	Flint, Michigan	Active	
1564	**Pi Rho**	August 7, 1964	San Bernardino, California	Active	
1565	**Rho Rho**	September 5, 1964	Ahoskie, North Carolina	Active	
1567	**Tau Rho**	December 7, 1964	Fredericksburg, Virginia	Active	
1566	**Sigma Rho**	December 19, 1964	Ann Arbor, Michigan	Active	
1571	**Psi Rho**	August 3, 1965	Holly Springs, Mississippi	Active	
1570	**Chi Rho**	August 11, 1965	Wheatley Heights, New York	Active	
1572	**Alpha Nu**	December 11, 1965	Stamford, Connecticut	Active	
1572	**Alpha Nu**	December 11, 1965	Norwalk, Connecticut	Active	
1573	**Beta Nu**	March 1, 1966	Proctorville, North Carolina	Active	
1574	**Gamma Nu**	March 15, 1967	Cocoa, Florida	Active	
1575	**Delta Nu**	April 6, 1967	Hickory, North Carolina	Active	
1576	**Epsilon Nu**	June 10, 1967	Spartanburg, South Carolina	Active	
1585	**Xi Nu**	May 8, 1968	San Jose, California	Active	
1577	**Zeta Nu**	June 21, 1968	Portland, Oregon	Active	
1578	**Eta Nu**	June 11, 1969	Pompano Beach, Florida	Active	
1579	**Theta Nu**	December 20, 1969	Muskegon Heights, Michigan	Active	
1127	Kappa Theta	January 15, 1970	Indianapolis, Indiana	Inactive	
1583	**Mu Nu**	May 23, 1970	Silver Spring, Maryland	Active	
1582	**Lambda Nu**	June 1, 1970	Franklin, Virginia	Active	
1584	**Nu Nu**	August 1, 1970	Willingboro Township, New Jersey	Active	
1586	**Omicron Nu**	January 1, 1971	Seaside, California	Active	
1587	**Pi Nu**	February 17, 1971	Miami, Florida	Active	
1588	**Rho Nu**	April 1, 1971	Galveston, Texas	Active	
1589	**Sigma Nu**	June 28, 1971	Providence, Rhode Island	Active	
1590	**Tau Nu**	July 16, 1971	Fort Wayne, Indiana	Active	
1591	**Upsilon Nu**	October 12, 1971	Richmond, Virginia	Active	
1592	**Phi Nu (First)**	January 14, 1972	Mohegan Lake, New York	Active	(Note: Originally a graduate chapter, Phi Nu expanded and added on an undergraduate attachment at West Point in 1994.)
1593	**Chi Nu**	January 19, 1972	Fresno, California	Active	
1594	**Psi Nu**	April 7, 1972	Alexandria, Virginia	Active	
1595	**Omega Nu**	May 2, 1972	Springfield, Illinois	Active	
1597	**Beta Pi**	January 12, 1973	Gainesville, Florida	Active	
1596	**Alpha Pi**	February 18, 1973	Florence, Alabama	Active	
1598	**Gamma Pi**	March 5, 1973	Prince George's County, Maryland	Active	
1599	**Delta Pi**	March 15, 1973	Tacoma, Washington	Active	
1600	Epsilon Pi (First)	March 23, 1973– 1981	Media, Pennsylvania	Moved	
1601	**Zeta Pi**	March 27, 1973	Erie, Pennsylvania	Active	
1602	**Eta Pi**	May 2, 1973	Montclair, New Jersey	Active	
1603	**Theta Pi**	July 31, 1973	Vallejo, California	Active	
1605	**Kappa Pi**	November 6, 1973	Lancaster, South Carolina	Active	
1606	**Lambda Pi**	November 21, 1973	Kinston, North Carolina	Active	
1604	**Iota Pi**	March 9, 1974	Grand Rapids, Michigan	Active	
1607	**Mu Pi**	March 9, 1974	Greenville, South Carolina	Active	
1608	**Nu Pi**	March 9, 1974	Joliet, Illinois	Active	
1609	**Xi Pi**	July 18, 1974	Colorado Springs, Colorado	Active	
1610	**Omicron Pi**	July 18, 1974	Killeen, Texas	Active	
1612	**Rho Pi**	January 17, 1975	Jacksonville, Florida	Active	
1611	**Pi Pi**	February 18, 1975	Midland, Michigan	Active	
1613	**Sigma Pi**	April 19, 1975	Aiken, South Carolina	Active	
1614	**Tau Pi**	April 19, 1975	Columbia, Maryland	Active	
1615	**Upsilon Pi**	July 20, 1975	Kalamazoo, Michigan	Active	
1616	Phi Pi	November 12, 1975– xxxx ?	Muskogee, Oklahoma	Inactive	
1617	**Chi Pi**	November 12, 1975	Syracuse, New York	Active	
1618	**Psi Pi**	November 12, 1975	Clarksville, Tennessee	Active	
1619	**Omega Pi**	November 12, 1975	Durham, North Carolina	Active	
1620	**Alpha Xi**	November 15, 1975	LaGrange, Georgia	Active	
1621	**Beta Xi**	January 28, 1976	Evansville, Indiana	Active	
1622	**Gamma Xi**	March 22, 1976	Virginia Beach, Virginia	Active	
1623	**Delta Xi**	April 1, 1976	Rowlett, Texas	Active	
1624	**Epsilon Xi**	April 10, 1976	Sacramento, California	Active	
1625	**Zeta Xi**	August 15, 1976	St. Thomas, Virgin Islands	Active	
1627	**Theta Xi**	October 13, 1976	Peoria, Illinois	Active	
1580	**Iota Nu**	November 20, 1976	Aberdeen Proving Ground, Maryland	Active	
1628	**Iota Xi**	November 20, 1976	New York City, New York	Active	
1630	**Lambda Xi**	February 22, 1977	Seoul, Korea	Active	(Note: Chapter was charted at the Eighth United States Army Headquarters in Yongsan, Republic of Korea.)
1631	**Mu Xi**	March 11, 1977	Glen Ellyn, Illinois	Active	
1632	**Nu Xi**	March 12, 1977	Natchez, Mississippi	Active	
1246	Iota Kappa	March 12, 1977	St. Francisville, Louisiana	Active	(Note: This was an intermediate chapter.)
1633	**Xi Xi**	March 25, 1977	Fort Knox, Kentucky	Active	
1634	**Omicron Xi**	April 3, 1977	Kansas City, Kansas	Active	
1248	**Lambda Kappa**	April 28, 1977	Durham, North Carolina	Active	
1635	**Pi Xi**	August 17, 1977	Nassau, Bahamas	Active	
1636	**Rho Xi**	August 31, 1977	Freeport, Texas	Active	
1637	**Sigma Xi**	August 31, 1977	Champaign, Illinois	Active	
1252	**Omicron Kappa**	September 1, 1977	Springfield, Missouri	Active	
1639	**Upsilon Xi**	November 1, 1977	Lakeland, Florida	Active	
1640	**Phi Xi**	March 10, 1978	Fort Riley, Kansas	Active	
1641	**Chi Xi**	March 10, 1978	Saginaw, Michigan	Active	
1642	**Psi Xi**	March 10, 1978	Ventura County, California	Active	
1646	**Alpha Alpha Alpha**	March 10, 1978– xxxx ?; 2013	Morgantown, West Virginia	Active	
1648	**Gamma Alpha Alpha**	September 15, 1978	Anchorage, Alaska	Active	
1259	**Chi Kappa**	September 15, 1978	Baltimore, Maryland	Active	
1650	**Epsilon Alpha Alpha**	September 16, 1978	Jonesboro, Arkansas	Active	
1649	**Delta Alpha Alpha**	September 16, 1978	Tucson, Arizona	Active	
1647	**Beta Alpha Alpha**	September 18, 1978	White Plains, New York	Active	(Note: This is a Life Member Graduate chapter.)
1652	**Eta Alpha Alpha**	July 30, 1979	Claremont, California	Active	
1265	**Delta Lambda**	August 6, 1979	New Britain, Connecticut	Active	
1651	**Zeta Alpha Alpha**	August 15, 1979	Hampden-Sydney, Virginia	Active	
1653	**Theta Alpha Alpha**	September 22, 1979	Bowling Green, Kentucky	Active	
1654	**Iota Alpha Alpha**	September 22, 1979	Easton, Maryland	Active	
1655	**Kappa Alpha Alpha**	September 22, 1979	Decatur, Georgia	Active	
1656	**Lambda Alpha Alpha**	March 15, 1980	Boynton Beach, Florida	Active	
1657	**Mu Alpha Alpha**	March 15, 1980	Artesia, California	Active	
1658	**Nu Alpha Alpha**	March 15, 1980	Bloomington, Indiana	Active	
1659	Xi Alpha Alpha	March 15, 1980– xxxx ?	Natchitoches, Louisiana	Inactive	
1661	**Pi Alpha Alpha**	April 25, 1980	Jackson, Tennessee	Active	
1660	**Omicron Alpha Alpha**	May 19, 1980	Farmington, Michigan	Active	
1662	**Rho Alpha Alpha**	August 8, 1980	Cleveland, Mississippi	Active	
1663	**Sigma Alpha Alpha**	August 9, 1980	Moss Point, Mississippi	Active	
1664	**Tau Alpha Alpha**	December 8, 1980	Bakersfield, California	Active	
1668	**Psi Alpha Alpha**	December 26, 1980	Fairfax County, Virginia	Active	
1669	**Omega Alpha Alpha**	December 26, 1980	Beaufort, South Carolina	Active	
1665	**Upsilon Alpha Alpha**	December 30, 1980	Panama City, Florida	Active	
1666	**Phi Alpha Alpha**	December 30, 1980	Goldsboro, North Carolina	Active	
1285	**Omega Lambda**	December 30, 1980	Philadelphia, Pennsylvania	Active	
1670	**Alpha Beta Beta**	March 14, 1981	Hartsville, South Carolina	Active	
1671	**Beta Beta Beta**	March 14, 1981	Wilson, North Carolina	Active	
1672	**Gamma Beta Beta**	March 14, 1981	Shelby, North Carolina	Active	
1673	**Delta Beta Beta**	March 14, 1981	Moline, Illinois	Active	
1675	**Zeta Beta Beta**	April 15, 1981	Athens, Georgia	Active	
1676	**Eta Beta Beta**	August 15, 1981	Lexington, North Carolina	Active	
1600	**Epsilon Pi (Second)**	1981	Chester, Pennsylvania	Active	
1678	**Iota Beta Beta**	June 25, 1982	Saint Stephen, South Carolina	Active	
1679	**Kappa Beta Beta**	June 25, 1982	Dothan, Alabama	Active	
1680	**Lambda Beta Beta**	June 25, 1982	Honolulu, Hawaii	Active	
1681	**Mu Beta Beta**	August 8, 1982	Thomasville, Georgia	Active	
1682	**Nu Beta Beta**	August 8, 1982	Teaneck, New Jersey	Active	
1683	**Xi Beta Beta**	August 8, 1982	Vidalia, Georgia	Active	
1693	**Omicron Beta Beta**	October 23, 1982	Fort Myers, Florida	Active	
1685	**Pi Beta Beta**	October 23, 1982	Bradenton, Florida	Active	
1686	**Rho Beta Beta**	October 23, 1982	Houston, Texas	Active	
1674	**Epsilon Beta Beta**	February 14, 1983	Notre Dame, Indiana	Active	
1688	**Tau Beta Beta**	March 25, 1983	Weldon, North Carolina	Active	
1690	**Phi Beta Beta**	March 27, 1983	Inglewood, California	Active	
1687	**Sigma Beta Beta**	April 24, 1983	Westbury, New York	Active	
1691	**Chi Beta Beta**	July 16, 1983	Normal, Illinois	Active	
1692	**Psi Beta Beta**	July 25, 1983	Huntington, West Virginia	Active	
1694	**Alpha Gamma Gamma**	August 15, 1983	Valdosta, Georgia	Active	
1693	**Omega Beta Beta**	August 15, 1983	Eatonville, Florida	Active	
1696	**Gamma Gamma Gamma**	January 6, 1984	Madison, Wisconsin	Active	
1697	**Delta Gamma Gamma**	January 6, 1984	Lincoln, Nebraska	Active	
1698	**Epsilon Gamma Gamma**	January 14, 1984	Greenwood, South Carolina	Active	
1704	**Lambda Gamma Gamma**	January 29, 1984	Clinton, Maryland	Active	
1695	**Beta Gamma Gamma**	March 17, 1984	Fort Stewart, Georgia	Active	
1699	**Zeta Gamma Gamma**	August 1, 1984	Oak Ridge, Tennessee	Active	
1700	**Eta Gamma Gamma**	September 29, 1984	Waterloo, Iowa	Active	
1701	**Theta Gamma Gamma**	September 29, 1984	Belle Glade, Florida	Active	
1702	**Iota Gamma Gamma**	December 29, 1984	Fort Johnson, Vernon Parish, Louisiana	Active	
1703	**Kappa Gamma Gamma**	December 29, 1984	Anderson, South Carolina	Active	
1705	**Mu Gamma Gamma**	October 15, 1985	Somerset, New Jersey	Active	
1706	**Nu Gamma Gamma**	December 7, 1985	Panama City, Panama	Active	
1708	**Omicron Gamma Gamma**	March 10, 1986	Arlington, Texas	Active	
1707	**Xi Gamma Gamma**	March 22, 1986	Oceanside, California	Active	
1713	**Upsilon Gamma Gamma**	June 6, 1986	Fort Gordon, Richmond County, Georgia	Active	(Note: This is a military graduate chapter.)
1709	**Pi Gamma Gamma**	February 28, 1987	Murfreesboro, Tennessee	Active	
1711	**Sigma Gamma Gamma**	February 28, 1987	Okinawa, Japan	Active	
1710	**Rho Gamma Gamma**	March 1, 1987	Chicago, Illinois	Active	
1712	**Tau Gamma Gamma**	December 6, 1987	Fort Bragg, North Carolina	Active	
1714	Phi Gamma Gamma (First)	July 29, 1988– September 2001	Würzburg, Bavaria, Germany	Inactive, Reassigned	
1715	**Chi Gamma Gamma**	July 29, 1988	Marietta, Georgia	Active	
1717	**Omega Gamma Gamma**	December 9, 1988	Warner Robins, Georgia	Active	
1716	**Psi Gamma Gamma**	December 16, 1988	Columbus, Mississippi	Active	
1718	**Alpha Iota Iota**	September 15, 1989	Plano, Texas	Active	
1719	**Beta Iota Iota**	December 9, 1989	Vineland, New Jersey	Active	
1720	**Gamma Iota Iota**	December 9, 1989	Dyersburg, Tennessee	Active	
1721	**Delta Iota Iota**	December 9, 1989	Stockton, California	Active	
1723	**Zeta Iota Iota**	July 20, 1990	Philadelphia, Pennsylvania	Active	
1722	**Epsilon Iota Iota**	August 2, 1990	Hamden, Connecticut	Active	
1724	**Eta Iota Iota**	December 8, 1990	St. Croix, Virgin Islands	Active	
1725	**Theta Iota Iota**	December 8, 1990	Meridian, Mississippi	Active	
1726	**Iota Iota Iota**	December 8, 1990	Salt Lake City, Utah	Active	
1320	**Lambda Delta Delta**	October 15, 1991	Aurora, Colorado	Active	
1728	**Lambda Iota Iota**	December 7, 1991	Bennettsville, South Carolina	Active	
1321	**Mu Delta Delta**	December 7, 1991	DeKalb, Illinois	Active	
1729	**Mu Iota Iota**	December 7, 1991	Fort Drum, New York	Active	
1731	**Xi Iota Iota**	December 7, 1991	Sidney, Ohio	Active	
1732	**Omicron Iota Iota**	May 29, 1992	Leavenworth County, Kansas	Active	
1733	**Pi Iota Iota**	May 29, 1992	Fort Moore, Georgia	Active	
1734	**Rho Iota Iota**	August 7, 1992	Lakewood, California	Active	
1735	**Sigma Iota Iota**	August 7, 1992	Lancaster, California	Active	
1736	**Tau Iota Iota**	August 7, 1992	St. George, South Carolina	Active	
1737	**Upsilon Iota Iota**	October 28, 1992	Paducah, Kentucky	Active	
1738	**Phi Iota Iota**	December 31, 1992	LaPlace, Louisiana	Active	
1739	**Chi Iota Iota**	August 18, 1993	Fort Jackson	Active	
1739	**Chi Iota Iota**	August 18, 1993	Columbia, South Carolina	Active	
1740	**Psi Iota Iota**	April 10, 1994	Shalimar, Florida	Active	
1742	**Alpha Kappa Kappa**	July 23, 1994	Gary, Indiana	Active	
1743	**Beta Kappa Kappa**	July 23, 1994	High Point, North Carolina	Active	
1744	**Gamma Kappa Kappa**	July 23, 1994	Gaffney, South Carolina	Active	
1765	**Omega Iota Iota**	July 23, 1994	Montgomery, Alabama	Active	
1009	**Iota (Third)**	February 12, 1995	Chicago, Illinois	Active	
1745	**Delta Kappa Kappa**	July 12, 1995	Hot Springs, Arkansas	Active	
1746	**Epsilon Kappa Kappa**	July 12, 1995	Canton, Mississippi	Active	
1747	**Zeta Kappa Kappa**	July 12, 1995	Beachwood, Ohio	Active	
1748	**Eta Kappa Kappa**	August 3, 1995	Lufkin, Texas	Active	
1749	**Theta Kappa Kappa**	August 19, 1995	Evanston, Illinois	Active	
1363	**Grand**	December 1, 1995	Decatur, Georgia	Active	
1750	**Iota Kappa Kappa**	December 7, 1995	Daytona Beach, Florida	Active	
1727	**Kappa Iota Iota**	December 7, 1995	Fort Eustis, Newport News, Virginia	Active	
1751	**Kappa Kappa Kappa**	December 7, 1995	Statesboro, Georgia	Active	
1826	**Xi Mu Nu**	December 7, 1995	Statesboro, Georgia	Active	
1752	**Lambda Kappa Kappa**	December 7, 1995	Baton Rouge, Louisiana	Active	
1754	**Nu Kappa Kappa**	August 2, 1996	Green Bay, Wisconsin	Active	
1755	**Xi Kappa Kappa**	December 14, 1996	Yazoo City, Mississippi	Active	
1756	**Omicron Kappa Kappa**	December 14, 1996	Herndon, Virginia	Active	
1756	**Omicron Kappa Kappa**	December 14, 1996	Reston, Virginia	Active	
1756	**Omicron Kappa Kappa**	December 14, 1996	Fairfax County, Virginia	Active	
1757	**Pi Kappa Kappa**	April 17, 1997	Sicklerville, New Jersey	Active	
1758	**Rho Kappa Kappa**	May 17, 1997	Lebanon, Tennessee	Active	
1753	**Mu Kappa Kappa**	October 1, 1997	San Diego, California	Active	
1568	**Upsilon Rho**	October 1, 1997	Lafayette, Louisiana	Active	
1759	**Sigma Kappa Kappa**	May 14, 1998– 20xx ?; July 15, 2016	Chesapeake, Virginia	Active	
1760	**Tau Kappa Kappa**	July 11, 1998	Southfield, Michigan	Active	
1761	**Upsilon Kappa Kappa**	July 11, 1998	Lafayette, Indiana	Active	
1762	**Phi Kappa Kappa**	December 5, 1998	East Point, Georgia	Active	
1763	**Chi Kappa Kappa**	December 5, 1998	Bogalusa, Louisiana	Active	
1187	**Chi Delta (Second)**	January 16, 2020	College Park, Maryland	Active	(Note: Originally founded as an undergraduate chapter, it was reclassified in 2020.)
1766	**Alpha Lambda Lambda**	October 19, 2000	Frederick, Maryland	Active	
1767	**Beta Lambda Lambda**	December 6, 2000	Lawrenceville, Georgia	Active	
1769	**Delta Lambda Lambda**	May 29, 2001	Burlington, North Carolina	Active	
1768	**Gamma Lambda Lambda**	July 27, 2001	Houma, Louisiana	Active	
1771	**Zeta Lambda Lambda**	October 1, 2001	Hamilton, Bermuda	Active	
1772	**Eta Lambda Lambda**	November 12, 2001	Red Oak, Texas	Active	
1770	**Epsilon Lambda Lambda**	December 1, 2001	Opelousas, Louisiana	Active	
1773	**Theta Lambda Lambda**	January 9, 2002	Peachtree City, Georgia	Active	
1774	**Iota Lambda Lambda**	March 27, 2002	State College, Pennsylvania	Active	
1775	**Kappa Lambda Lambda**	August 9, 2002	Freeport, Bahamas	Active	
1776	**Lambda Lambda Lambda**	October 15, 2002	Americus, Georgia	Active	
1777	**Mu Lambda Lambda**	November 6, 2002	Tunica, Mississippi	Active	
1778	**Nu Lambda Lambda**	January 4, 2003	Jersey City, New Jersey	Active	
1779	**Xi Lambda Lambda**	September 25, 2003	Nanuet, New York	Active	
1780	**Omicron Lambda Lambda**	January 22, 2004	Little Rock, Arkansas	Active	
1782	**Rho Lambda Lambda**	January 22, 2004	Newark, New Jersey	Active	
	**Rho Lambda Lambda**	January 22, 2004	Orange, New Jersey	Active	
1781	**Pi Lambda Lambda**	January 24, 2004	Dumfries, Virginia	Active	
1782	**Sigma Lambda Lambda**	May 28, 2004	Memphis, Tennessee	Active	
1784	**Tau Lambda Lambda**	June 11, 2004	Waldorf, Maryland	Active	
1785	**Upsilon Lambda Lambda**	July 22, 2004	Tokyo, Japan	Active	
1786	**Phi Lambda Lambda**	September 10, 2004	Jacksonville, North Carolina	Active	
1787	**Chi Lambda Lambda**	December 7, 2004	Matteson, Illinois	Active	
1788	**Psi Lambda Lambda**	January 20, 2005	New York City, New York	Active	
1789	**Omega Lambda Lambda**	January 20, 2005	Madison, Tennessee	Active	
1764	**Psi Kappa Kappa**	August 19, 2005	Madison, Alabama	Active	
1790	Alpha Mu Mu	July 21, 2006– 20xx ?	Bryan-College Station, Texas	Inactive	
1791	**Beta Mu Mu**	January 26, 2007	Las Vegas, Nevada	Active	
1792	Gamma Mu Mu	February 25, 2008– 20xx ?	Stillwater, Oklahoma	Inactive	
1795	**Zeta Mu Mu**	March 14, 2008	Williamsburg, Virginia	Active	
1794	**Epsilon Mu Mu**	March 15, 2008	MacDill Air Force Base, Tampa, Florida	Active	
1344	**Alpha Delta Xi**	June 6, 2008	Ottawa, Ontario, Canada	Active	
1796	**Eta Mu Mu**	July 18, 2008	Denton, Texas	Active	
1797	**Theta Mu Mu**	September 26, 2008	Baltimore County, Maryland	Active	
1798	**Iota Mu Mu**	November 1, 2008	Landover, Maryland	Active	
1793	**Delta Mu Mu**	March 15, 2009	Atlanta, Georgia	Active	
1799	**Kappa Mu Mu**	March 27, 2009	Greenville, Mississippi	Active	
1800	**Lambda Mu Mu**	February 6, 2010	Toronto, Canada	Active	
1765	**Omega Kappa Kappa**	March 22, 2010	Georgia	Active	
1801	**Mu Mu Mu**	May 6, 2010	Douglasville, Georgia	Active	
1802	**Nu Mu Mu**	May 6, 2010	Olive Branch, Mississippi	Active	
1803	**Xi Mu Mu**	September 1, 2011	Cary, North Carolina	Active	
1804	**Sigma Mu Mu**	September 1, 2011	Ashburn, Virginia	Active	
1806	**Omicron Mu Mu**	September 6, 2011	Lansing, Illinois	Active	
1805	**Pi Mu Mu**	September 6, 2011	Yeadon, Pennsylvania	Active	
1807	**Rho Mu Mu**	September 6, 2011	Chicago, Illinois	Active	
1808	**Tau Mu Mu**	November 16, 2011	Rome, Georgia	Active	
1809	**Phi Mu Mu**	November 16, 2011	Conway, Arkansas	Active	
1810	**Chi Mu Mu**	April 17, 2012	Birmingham, England	Active	
1811	**Psi Mu Mu**	July 5, 2012	Olive Branch, Mississippi	Active	
1812	**Omega Mu Mu**	July 5, 2012	Tupelo, Mississippi	Active	
1814	**Beta Mu Nu**	August 29, 2013	Calera, Alabama	Active	
1815	**Gamma Mu Nu**	October 9, 2013	Middletown, Delaware	Active	
1813	**Alpha Mu Nu**	January 14, 2014	Pocono Mountains, Pennsylvania	Active	
1816	**Delta Mu Nu**	January 18, 2014	McComb, Mississippi	Active	
1817	**Epsilon Mu Nu**	April 24, 2014	Minot, North Dakota	Active	
1818	**Zeta Mu Nu**	September 26, 2014	Jonesboro, Georgia	Active	
1819	**Eta Mu Nu**	September 26, 2014	Philadelphia, Pennsylvania	Active	
1820	**Theta Mu Nu**	January 23, 2015	Saint Charles, Missouri	Active	
1821	**Iota Mu Nu**	January 23, 2015	Saint Johns, Florida	Active	
1355	**Alpha Delta Alpha**	January 21, 2016	Savannah, Georgia	Active	
1822	**Kappa Mu Nu**	January 21, 2016	North Sioux City, South Dakota	Active	
1823	**Lambda Mu Nu**	July 28, 2016	Phenix City, Alabama	Active	
1824	**Mu Mu Nu**	July 28, 2016	Spring, Texas	Active	
1828	**Pi Mu Nu**	September 20, 2016	Fort Valley, Georgia	Active	
1825	**Nu Mu Nu**	November 1, 2016	Kokomo, Indiana	Active	
1827	**Omicron Mu Nu**	January 19, 2017	West Chester, Pennsylvania	Active	
1832	**Upsilon Mu Nu**	September 17, 2017	Troy, Alabama	Active	
1830	**Sigma Mu Nu**	September 22, 2017	Fort Leonard Wood, Missouri	Active	
1300	**Omicron Mu (Second)**	December 8, 2017	Woodland Hills, California	Active	
1105	**Mu Gamma (Second)**	January 2018	Dallas, Texas	Active	
1829	**Rho Mu Nu**	January 20, 2018	Canton, Michigan	Active	
1357	**Alpha Delta Gamma**	January 20, 2018	Aberdeen Proving Ground, Aberdeen, Maryland	Active	
1831	**Tau Mu Nu**	January 20, 2018	Shelby Township, Michigan	Active	
1714	**Phi Gamma Gamma (Second)**	March 31, 2018	Kaiserslautern, Rhineland-Palatinate, Germany	Active	
1833	**Phi Mu Nu**	June 26, 2018	Fishers, Indiana	Active	
206522	**Omega Mu Nu**	November 15, 2018	Lake Elsinore, California	Active	
206523	**Alpha Nu Nu**	November 15, 2018	Reno, Nevada	Active	
220893	**Chi Mu Nu**	December 1, 2018	Shanghai, China	Active	
220894	**Psi Mu Nu**	January 24, 2019	Middleburg, Florida	Active	
1838	**Beta Nu Nu**	March 22, 2019	Tijuana, Baja California, Mexico	Active	
1362	**Alpha Epsilon Epsilon**	June 19, 2019	Pensacola, Florida	Active	
1569	**Phi Rho**	June 30, 2019	Hattiesburg, Mississippi	Active	
1839	**Gamma Nu Nu**	July 11, 2019	Columbus, New Jersey	Active	
1730	**Nu Iota Iota**	September 25, 2019	Auburn, Alabama	Active	
1840	**Delta Nu Nu**	December 9, 2019	United Arab Emirates	Active	
207852	**Epsilon Nu Nu**	July 17, 2020	Mount Pleasant, South Carolina	Active	
208849	**Zeta Nu Nu**	August 31, 2020	Miami, Florida	Active	
208869	**Eta Nu Nu**	November 19, 2020	Columbus, Ohio	Active	
211439	**Theta Nu Nu**	November 19, 2020	Lincoln, Pennsylvania	Active	
211504	**Iota Nu Nu**	February 1, 2021	Greenville, North Carolina	Active	
1244	**Eta Kappa (Second)**	April 26, 2021	Lancaster, Pennsylvania	Active	
211496	**Lambda Nu Nu**	April 28, 2021	Frostburg, Maryland	Active	
211495	**Kappa Nu Nu**	April 29, 2021	Sparta, New Jersey	Active	
211480	**Mu Nu Nu**	April 29, 2021	Kechi, Kansas	Active	
211549	**Nu Nu Nu**	June 24, 2021	Puerto Plata, Dominican Republic	Active	
211551	**Alpha Epsilon Eta**	June 24, 2021	Conway, South Carolina	Active	
213093	**Xi Nu Nu**	December 15, 2021	Litchfield Park, Arizona	Active	
213098	**Omicron Nu Nu**	December 15, 2021	Round Rock, Texas	Active	
213227	**Pi Nu Nu**	January 29, 2022	Covington, Georgia	Active	
215281	**Rho Nu Nu**	July 21, 2022	Chula Vista, California	Active	
217443	**Sigma Nu Nu**	January 26, 2023	Fairhope, Alabama	Active	
217505	**Tau Nu Nu**	March 9, 2023	Palm Springs, California	Active	
220420	**Upsilon Nu Nu**	October 17, 2023	Newberry, South Carolina	Active	
220893	**Chi Nu Nu**	December 12, 2023	Lexington Park, Maryland	Active	
220894	**Psi Nu Nu**	December 12, 2023	Dover, Delaware	Active	
220859	**Phi Nu Nu**	December 13, 2023	Prince Frederick, Maryland	Active	
222342	**Gamma Xi Nu**	February 1, 2024	Madera, California	Active	
223133	**Delta Xi Nu**	April 9, 2024	Union County, North Carolina	Active	
223136	**Zeta Xi Nu**	April 9, 2024	Lagos, Nigeria	Active	
223137	**Alpha Epsilon Theta**	April 9, 2024	Denver, Colorado	Active	
223175	**Eta Xi Nu**	June 13, 2024	Universal City, Texas	Active	
226790	**Mu Xi Nu**	April 22, 2025	Tappahannock, Virginia	Active	
224391	**Alpha Epsilon Nu**	September 25, 2024	Corvallis, Oregon	Active	
226789	**Alpha Epsilon Xi**	April 22, 2025	Chester, Pennsylvania	Active	
226788	**Alpha Epsilon Omicron**	April 22, 2025	Las Vegas, Nevada	Active	
1005	**Epsilon (Second)**	20xx ?	New York City, New York	Active	
