= Dennis Graham =

American baseball player

- Outfielder
- Born: June 14, 1896; Proctorville, North Carolina, U. S.
- Died: December 2, 1967 (aged 71); Pittsburgh, Pennsylvania, U.S.
- Batted: Left

white league baseball debut
- 1921, for the Bacharach Giants

Last appearance
- 1931, for the Pittsburgh Crawfords
- Stats at Baseball Reference

Teams
- Bacharach Giants (1921); Homestead Grays (1924–1930); Pittsburgh Crawfords (1931)

Dennis Wilson Graham (June 14, 1896 – December 2, 1967), nicknamed "Peaches", was an American Negro league outfielder between 1921 and 1931.

A native of Proctorville, North Carolina, Graham attended Shaw University. He made his Negro leagues debut in 1921 with the Bacharach Giants. Graham went on to spend seven seasons with the Homestead Grays, and finished his career with a short stint with the Pittsburgh Crawfords in 1931. He died in Pittsburgh, Pennsylvania in 1967 at age 71.
