= Proctorville =

Proctorville may refer to:

- Proctorville, Ohio
- Proctorville, North Carolina
