= St. Mary of the Assumption High School =

High school in Union County, New Jersey, US

Saint Mary of the Assumption High School
- Princeps schola Assumptionis Sanctae Mariae
- Logo

Location
- 237 South Broad Street; Elizabeth, (Union County), New Jersey 07202; United States
- 40°39′29″N 74°12′57″W

Information
- Type: Private, Coeducational
- Motto: Celebrating Our Past, Focused on Our Future!
- Religious affiliation: Roman Catholic
- Established: 1930
- Founder: Sisters of Charity
- Closed: August 30, 2019
- School district: Roman Catholic Archdiocese of Newark
- Superintendent: Margaret Dames
- NCES School ID: 00861456
- Principal: David Evans
- Faculty: 16.1 FTEs
- Grades: 9–12
- Average class size: 15
- Student to teacher ratio: 11.4:1
- Colors: Blue and white
- Song: The Bells of St. Mary's
- Athletics: Basketball, Cheerleading, Bowling, Step Team, Baseball, Softball
- Athletics conference: Union County Interscholastic Athletic Conference
- Team name: Hilltoppers
- Rival: The Patrick School
- Accreditation: Middle States Association of Colleges and Schools
- Newspaper: Hilltopper
- Yearbook: Ave Maria
- Tuition: $9,000 (2019-20)
- Website: stmaryhsnj.org

St. Mary of the Assumption High School was a small Catholic high school on Broad Street in Elizabeth, Union County, in the U.S. state of New Jersey. The high school building was a three-story brick building with a basement serving as additional classroom space for a total of four floors of education space. The school was affiliated with its parent parish, St. Mary's Church, and operated under the auspices of the Roman Catholic Archdiocese of Newark. The school had been accredited by the Middle States Association of Colleges and Schools Commission on Elementary and Secondary Schools since 1992. The school also housed the K-8 grammar school, St. Mary of the Assumption Elementary School. The elementary school consisted of the first floor and 3 classrooms on the second floor until its closure in June 2009.

As of the 2017–18 school year, the school had an enrollment of 184 students and 16.1 classroom teachers (on an FTE basis), for a student–teacher ratio of 11.4:1. The school's student body was 50.5% (93) Black, 21.2% (39) Asian, 19.6% (36) two or more races, 6.5% (12) White and 1.1% (2) Hispanic.

== History ==
The school opened in 1930. In June 2019, the school received notice that it would be closing that summer, something the principal believed as a surprise. The archdiocese cited the school's debt of $1.5 million and a decline of enrollment of student as reasons for the closure, as well as the decline in school-age children in Elizabeth and the rise of public charter schools, which compete for the same students as urban Catholic schools. Because of this, the archdiocese was unwilling to keep it afloat. In response the community established a GoFundMe to work to resolve the issue. Efforts to raise $2 million to pay off the debt and to keep the doors open fell far short of the fundraising goals and the school officially closed on August 30, 2019.

== Athletics ==
The St. Mary of the Assumption High School Hilltoppers competed in the Union County Interscholastic Athletic Conference, which included public and private high schools in Union County and operates under the supervision of the New Jersey State Interscholastic Athletic Association (NJSIAA). Prior to the 2010 NJSIAA's realignment, the school had participated in the Mountain Valley Conference, which consisted of public and private high schools covering Essex and Union counties in northern New Jersey. With 121 students in grades 10–12, the school was classified by the NJSIAA for the 2019–20 school year as Non-Public B for most athletic competition purposes, which included schools with an enrollment of 37 to 366 students in that grade range (equivalent to Group I for public schools).

School colors were blue and white. Sports offered include baseball (men), basketball (men and women), bowling (men and women).

The boys basketball team won the Non-Public Group A state championship in 1943 (against runner-up St. Peter's Preparatory School in the playoff final), and won the Non-Public B title in 1951 (vs. St. Mary's High School of South Amboy), 1952 (vs. St. Rose High School), 1953 (vs. St. Mary's High School of Perth Amboy), 1954 (vs. St. Joseph's High School of Camden), 1955 (vs. Gloucester Catholic) and 1960 (vs. St. Joseph's of Camden). The program's eight state titles are tied for seventh-most in the state. The 1954 team defeated St. Joseph's of Camden by a score of 54–37 in the Catholic Class B final at the Elizabeth Armory. The 1955 team won the program's fifth consecutive title and won its 20th game of the season with a 54–37 win against Gloucester Catholic in Class B.

The baseball team won the Non-Public Group B North state championship in 1963 and 1965, and won the Non-Public Group B title in 1983, defeating Gloucester Catholic High School in the tournament finals. The 1983 team finished the season with a 15–9 record after winning the Group B state title with a 5–1 victory against Gloucester Catholic in the championship game.

== Notable alumni ==
- J. Christian Bollwage (born 1955; class of 1972), mayor of Elizabeth, New Jersey
- Hubie Brown (born 1933; class of 1951), two-time NBA Coach of the Year (1978, 2004) and member of the Basketball Hall of Fame
- Gage Daye (born 1989), basketball coach and former player
- Thomas G. Dunn (1921–1998), politician who was the longtime Mayor of Elizabeth, and served in both houses of the New Jersey Legislature
- Chuck Feeney (1931–2023, class of 1949), businessman, philanthropist and the founder of The Atlantic Philanthropies, one of the largest private foundations in the world; his 2016 donation of $250,000 was the largest in school history
- Ralph Froehlich (1930–2014, class of 1949), sheriff of Union County who served for 37 years, making him the longest-serving sheriff in New Jersey history
- Bill Henry (1942–2022), Major League Baseball pitcher who played for the New York Yankees
- Robert Sparks (born 1947, class of 1965), former handball player who competed in the 1972 Summer Olympics and in the 1976 Summer Olympics
- Kevin M. Tucker (1940–2012), Commissioner of the Philadelphia Police Department from 1986 to 1988
