= W.R. Surles Memorial Library =

- U.S. National Register of Historic Places
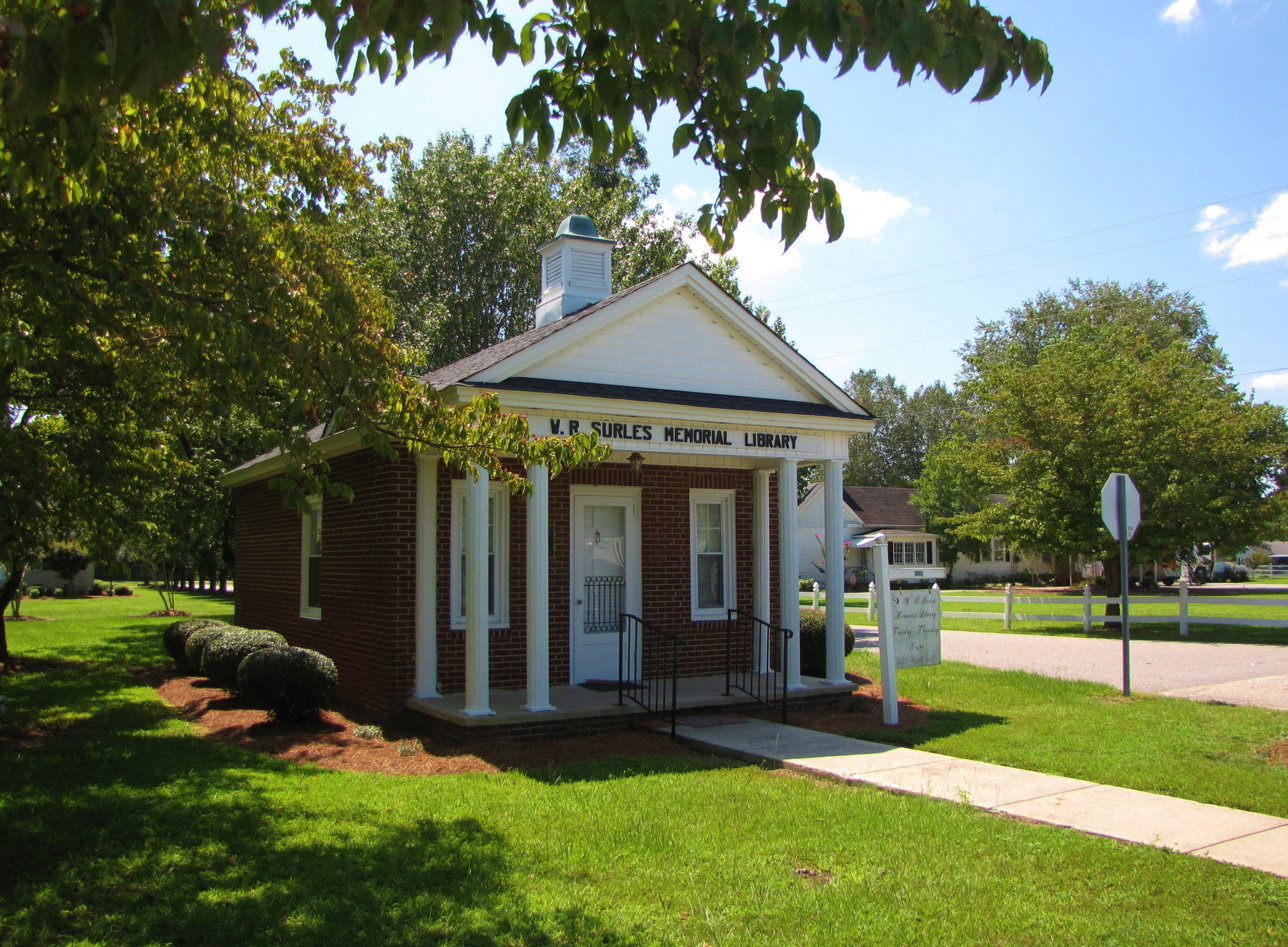
- W.R. Surles Memorial Library in 2017

- Location within North Carolina Location within the United States
- Location: 105 W. Main St., Proctorville, North Carolina
- Coordinates: 34°28′36″N 79°2′16″W
- Area: 7 acres (2.8 ha)
- Built: 1951
- Built by: T.A. Nye and Sons
- Architectural style: Colonial Revival
- NRHP reference No.: 09000725
- Added to NRHP: September 16, 2009

W.R. Surles Memorial Library is a historic library building located at Proctorville, Robeson County, North Carolina. It was built in 1951, and is a one-story, front-gabled, one-bay wide, brick building in the Colonial Revival style. It measures 20 feet wide and 30 feet long. It is a privately operated library open to the public.

It was added to the National Register of Historic Places in 2009.
