= Ralph Froehlich =

Sheriff in New Jersey

Ralph Froehlich (1930 – July 20, 2014) was a Democratic Party politician elected as sheriff in Union County, New Jersey, who served as the longest-serving sheriff in New Jersey history.

== Biography ==
Ralph Froehlich was born in 1930 in Elizabeth, New Jersey. He graduated from St. Mary of the Assumption High School in 1949. In 1951, he enlisted in the United States Marine Corps as an infantryman and later a drill instructor until his honorable discharge in 1959.

He was a member of the Elizabeth Police Department for almost twenty years attaining the rank of lieutenant. In 1975, he graduated from Kean College (since renamed as Kean University).

He was first elected sheriff in 1977 despite opposition from party leadership and was told that his refusal to take orders from county party leaders would prevent him from ever getting re-elected. Ultimately, he served for 13 terms over 37 years, before his death.

A resident of Union Township, Union County, New Jersey, Froelich died on July 20, 2014, at the age of 83 of cancer and buried at St. Mary of The Assumption Church.
