= Gage Daye =

American basketball player and coach

Personal information
- Born: June 11, 1989 (age 37)
- Listed height: 6 ft 2 in (1.88 m)

Career information
- High school: St. Mary's (Elizabeth, New Jersey)
- College: Bloomfield (2007–2011)
- NBA draft: 2011: undrafted
- Playing career: 2011–present
- Position: Guard
- Coaching career: 2012–present

Career history

Playing
- 2011: Fort Wayne Mad Ants
- 2012–2013: Sheffield Sharks
- 2014–2016: Wagga Heat

Coaching
- 2012–present: Bloomfield (assistant)

Career highlights
- 2x Waratah League D1 MVP (2015, 2016); 2x CACC Player of the Year (2010, 2011)

Gage Daye (born June 11, 1989) is an American basketball player and coach. Following his college career with Bloomfield, he went on to play professionally in the United States, England and Australia.

== College career ==
Daye played college basketball at Bloomfield College. As a senior in the 2010 season he averaged 24.1 ppg. and led the Deacons to their first ever Elite Eight appearance. He finished his career at Bloomfield as the school's all-time leading scorer with 2,518 points. During his senior season he was named the Central Atlantic Collegiate Conference (CACC) Player of the Year.

== Professional career ==
After going undrafted in the NBA draft, Daye signed with the Fort Wayne Mad Ants of the NBA Development League. He appeared in 4 games for the Mad Ants during the 2011–12 NBA Development League season, averaging 7.8 points and 2.5 assists. He was waived by the Mad Ants on December 20, 2011.

On August 23, 2012, Daye signed with the Sheffield Sharks of the British Basketball League prior to the 2012–13 season. For the season, he averaged 17.0 points, 6.1 rebounds, and 4.2 assists in 12 games.

On January 17, 2014, he signed with the Wagga Heat of Australia's Waratah League for the upcoming 2014 season. On July 25, 2015, Daye scored a career high 70 points in a 161–112 victory against the St. George Saints. He returned to the Heat for the 2016 season where he went on to average 40.5 points per game. After the season he was named the league's Player of the Year for the second year in a row.
