= Ted Koffman =

American politician (born 1944)

Theodore 'Ted' S. Koffman (born October 28, 1944) is an American politician from Maine. A Democrat from Bar Harbor, Koffman served in the Maine House of Representatives from 2000 to 2008. He was unable to seek re-election in 2008 due to term-limits. Koffman served as co-chair of the Natural Resources Committee from 2002 to 2008.

Koffman worked as the Director of Government and Community Relations at College of the Atlantic from 1976 to 2008. In 2009, he joined the Maine Audubon Society. He retired from Maine Audubon, May 1, 2014. He ran for the Maine Senate in 2014, but lost the general election to Brian Langley. He ran again in 2016, but lost the Democratic primary.

== Personal ==
Koffman was born in 1944 in Morristown, New Jersey. He earned an A.A. from Franconia College in 1966 and with a B.A. from Bloomfield College in 1968. He later earned a M.A. from Goddard College.

Maine House of Representatives
Preceded by Robert E. Stanwood	Member of the Maine House of Representatives from the 130th district 2000–2004	Succeeded by David Farrington
Preceded by Joseph Brannigan	Member of the Maine House of Representatives from the 35th district 2004–2008	Succeeded by Elspeth M. Flemings
