= Bill Henry (baseball, born 1942) =

American baseball player (born 1942)

- Pitcher
- Born: February 15, 1942; Long Beach, California, U.S.
- Died: January 29, 2022 (aged 79); Windermere, Florida, U.S.
- Batted: Left Threw: Left

MLB debut
- September 13, 1966, for the New York Yankees

Last MLB appearance
- September 25, 1966, for the New York Yankees

MLB statistics
- Win–loss record: 0–0
- Earned run average: 0.00
- Strikeouts: 3
- Stats at Baseball Reference

Teams
- New York Yankees (1966)

William Francis Henry (February 15, 1942 – January 29, 2022) was an American Major League Baseball pitcher who played for the New York Yankees in 1966.

== Background ==
Raised in Kenilworth, New Jersey, Henry graduated from Elizabeth, New Jersey's St. Mary of the Assumption High School and attended Seton Hall University on a baseball scholarship. In two career MLB games with the Yankees, he had a 0-0 record, with a 0.00 ERA. He pitched in 3 innings in his 2 career games, allowing no hits and two walks. He batted and threw left-handed.

Henry was signed by the Yankees as an amateur free agent in 1964. He died on January 29, 2022.
