= Marcheta P. Evans =

Woman of color college president

Marcheta P. Evans (born July 10, 1959) is an American professor, counselor, and academic administrator who has served as president of St. Catherine University in St. Paul, Minnesota, since 2024. Evans is the first African American and the 12th woman to serve as president of St. Catherine University, one of the largest women's universities in the nation.

Previously, Evans served as the 17th President of Bloomfield College in Bloomfield, New Jersey, from 2019 until the college's merger with Montclair State University in 2023. The college was renamed Bloomfield College of Montclair State University. Evans was the first woman and first African American to hold the position of Bloomfield College president. During her tenure, she was the only woman of color to actively serve as president of a four-year institution of higher education in New Jersey.

Prior to Bloomfield College, she was the Provost and Vice President for Academic Affairs at Our Lady of the Lake University in San Antonio. Evans also served as vice president for Academic Affairs, Dean at OLLU and Associate Dean and department chair at University of Texas at San Antonio.

Evans is a past president and fellow of The American Counseling Association and past president of the Association for Creativity in Counseling.

Evans has also authored numerous articles and book chapters, focusing on issues of diversity, multiculturalism, women's issues, and leadership. She has presented over one hundred times at the state, regional, national, and international levels addressing topics such as empowerment, multiculturalism, diversity, and leadership.
