= Robert Sparks (handballer) =

American handball player

Personal information
- Full name: Robert Benjamin Sparks
- Nationality: United States
- Born: September 11, 1947 (age 79) Jersey City, New Jersey

Sport
- Sport: Handball

Robert Benjamin Sparks (born September 11, 1947) is an American former handball player who competed in the 1972 Summer Olympics and in the 1976 Summer Olympics.

He was born in Jersey City, New Jersey, and was a resident of Clark, New Jersey when he competed at the 1972 games in Munich, as one of two New Jersey residents on the U.S. handball team. Sparks had been a pitcher on the baseball team at St. Mary of the Assumption High School in Elizabeth, and hadn't picked up the sport of team handball until 1970, when he attended a clinic run by U.S. team coach Peter Buehning Sr.

In 1972 he was part of the American team which finished 14th in the Olympic tournament. He played all five matches and scored three goals.

Four years later he finished tenth with the American team in the 1976 Olympic tournament. He played all five matches and scored four goals.
