= Nacho Díez =

Spanish basketball player

Personal information
- Born: 23 April 1996 (age 30) Madrid, Spain
- Listed height: 6 ft 7 in (2.01 m)
- Listed weight: 189 lb (86 kg)

Career information
- College: Bloomfield College
- Playing career: 2018–present
- Position: Forward

Career history
- 2018–2019: Fundación Lucentum

Ignacio "Nacho" Díez de la Faya (born 23 April 1996) is a Spanish professional basketball player.

He is brother of Dani Díez, a Real Madrid basketball player.

== Basketball career ==
Díez started his playing career in the Adecco Estudiantes, team that he left to join the U-14 Real Madrid Baloncesto in 2009. In his first seasons with Real Madrid, he obtained the Madrid Infantil (U-14) Championship in 2010 and the Madrid Cadete (U-16) Championship in 2012, being selected as the team's MVP.

In 2012 he joined Real Madrid Baloncesto junior team. In April 2013 they won the Madrid Junior (U-18) Championship by defeating Asefa Estudiantes in the final. A month later, they reached the third position in the Spanish Junior (U-18) Championship.

During the 2013/14 season he was appointed as Real Madrid junior team's captain. In January 2014, they won the prestigious Ciutat De L'Hospitalet Tournament (NIJT), a championship that Real Madrid hadn't won since 2006.

On 13 April 2014 Real Madrid junior team again won the Madrid Junior (U-18) Championship, by defeating Estudiantes and Torrelodones in the Final Four.

On 10 May 2014 Real Madrid won the 2014 Spain Junior (U-18) Championship, a title that they hadn't obtained for 14 years.

=== Teams ===
- 2003/09 ESP Estudiantes
- 2009/10 ESP U-14 Infantil Real Madrid Baloncesto
- 2010/12 ESP U-16 Cadete Real Madrid Baloncesto
- 2012/14 ESP U-18 Junior Real Madrid Baloncesto
- 2014- USA Bloomfield College

=== Spanish national team ===
In April 2014 he played with Under-18 Spanish national team at Barakaldo Tournament. Later that month, he was preselected to participate in the 2014 FIBA Europe Under-18 Championship, to be played during summer 2014 at Konya (Turkey).

== Awards and honors ==
=== Real Madrid ===
- Champion of Madrid Infantil (U-14) Championship 2010
- Champion of Madrid Cadete (U-16) Championship 2012
- Champion of Madrid Junior (U-18) Championship 2013 and 2014
- Champion of Ciutat De L'Hospitalet Tournament (NIJT) 2014
- Champion of Spain Junior (U-18) Championship 2014
