= Bloomfield College =

Public college in Bloomfield, New Jersey, US

Coordinates: 40.795°N 74.195°W

Bloomfield College of Montclair State University
- Former names: German Theological School (1868–1913); Bloomfield College and Seminary (1913–1961)
- Motto: Lux In Tenebris
- Motto in English: Light in the Darkness
- Type: Public college
- Established: 1868; 158 years ago
- Parent institution: Montclair State University
- Religious affiliation: Presbyterian Church (USA)
- Academic affiliations: Space-grant
- President: Marcheta P. Evans
- Faculty: 181
- Undergraduates: 1,598
- Location: Bloomfield, New Jersey, United States
- Campus: 12 acres (4.9 ha); Suburban
- Colors: Red and yellow
- Nickname: Bears
- Sporting affiliations: USCAA Division 1, USCAA, NJAIAW
- Mascot: Deacon the Bear
- Website: bloomfield.edu

Bloomfield College of Montclair State University is a public college in Bloomfield, in the U.S. state of New Jersey. It is chartered by the State of New Jersey and accredited by the Middle States Commission on Higher Education. The school became part of Montclair State University starting in July 2023, before which it had been a private college affiliated with the Presbyterian Church (USA) through the Synod of the Northeast.

Bloomfield College is the only 4-year college in New Jersey recognized simultaneously as a Predominantly Black Institution, Hispanic Serving Institution, and Minority Serving Institution.

== History ==
Bloomfield College was founded by the Presbyterian Church in 1868 as German Theological Seminary of Newark, New Jersey, to train German-speaking ministers. It moved to Bloomfield in 1872 and became four-year college in 1923. In 1912 it absorbed the Presbyterian Hospital School of Nursing, founded in 1912 in nearby Newark.

The school's enrollment peaked in 2011. In October 2021, the school announced that it could close in 2022–2023 if it did not find financial help.

In March 2022, Montclair State University announced that it would financially support the college until a merger was agreed upon. The merger was officially announced on October 28, 2022, under which the college would become Bloomfield College of Montclair State University. The merger was completed in July 2023.

== Academics ==
The college offers primarily undergraduate studies, but it has added master's programs in Accounting, Fine Arts, and Education. The college is accredited by the Middle States Commission on Higher Education.

Bloomfield College has approximately 1,598 students and about 65% of the students are commuters. Its gender composition is 63 percent female and 37 percent male. Its racial and ethnic composition is 48 percent black, 33 percent Hispanic, 9 percent white, and 2 percent Asian. Seventy-eight percent of the students were eligible for low-income Pell Grants. The academic staff consists of 60 full-time instructors and 120 part-time.

Bloomfield College has a graduation rate of 33 percent. Median salary after attending ranged from $18,548 (BA, Visual and Performing Arts) to $77,966 (BS, Nursing). Median student debt ranged from $26,000 to $33,912. Two years after student loan repayment began, 11 percent were making progress.

In its 2022 college rankings, U.S. News & World Report ranked Bloomfield College tied for 27th place for social mobility.

== Athletics ==
Bloomfield College of Montclair State University athletic teams previously competed in the National Collegiate Athletic Association's Division II, as members of the Central Atlantic Collegiate Conference (CACC). Men's sports included baseball, basketball, cross country, soccer, tennis, and track and field; while women's sports included basketball, bowling, cross country, soccer, softball, track and field, and volleyball. Beginning with the 2025–2026 academic year, the Bears will transition out of NCAA Division II and compete in Division I of the United States Collegiate Athletic Association (USCAA) as part of the North American Conference for Intercollegiate Athletics (NACIA), a USCAA Division I league. This move is part of a broader athletic realignment following the institution's merger with Montclair State University.

=== Move to USCAA ===
Bloomfield College of Montclair State University announced on July 15, 2025, that it would transition from NCAA Division II to compete in the USCAA Division 1, beginning a multi-year process aimed at elevating its athletic programs. The school plans to compete as a member of USCAA Division 1 starting with the 2025–26 season, positioning itself among other competitive programs within the association.

As part of this transition, Bloomfield College launches a program dedicated into supporting its student-athletes in its integration into USCAA Division 1 competition via providing competitive opportunities and academic resources throughout the process.

== Westminster Arts Center ==
Bloomfield College is home to the Westminster Arts Center.

== Notable alumni ==
- C. Louis Bassano, politician
- Ralph R. Caputo, politician
- Rupert Crosse, actor
- Sandra Bolden Cunningham, politician
- Gage Daye, professional basketball player
- Nacho Díez, professional basketball player
- Ted Koffman, politician
- David Stergakos, professional basketball player
