= Proctorville, North Carolina =

- Town
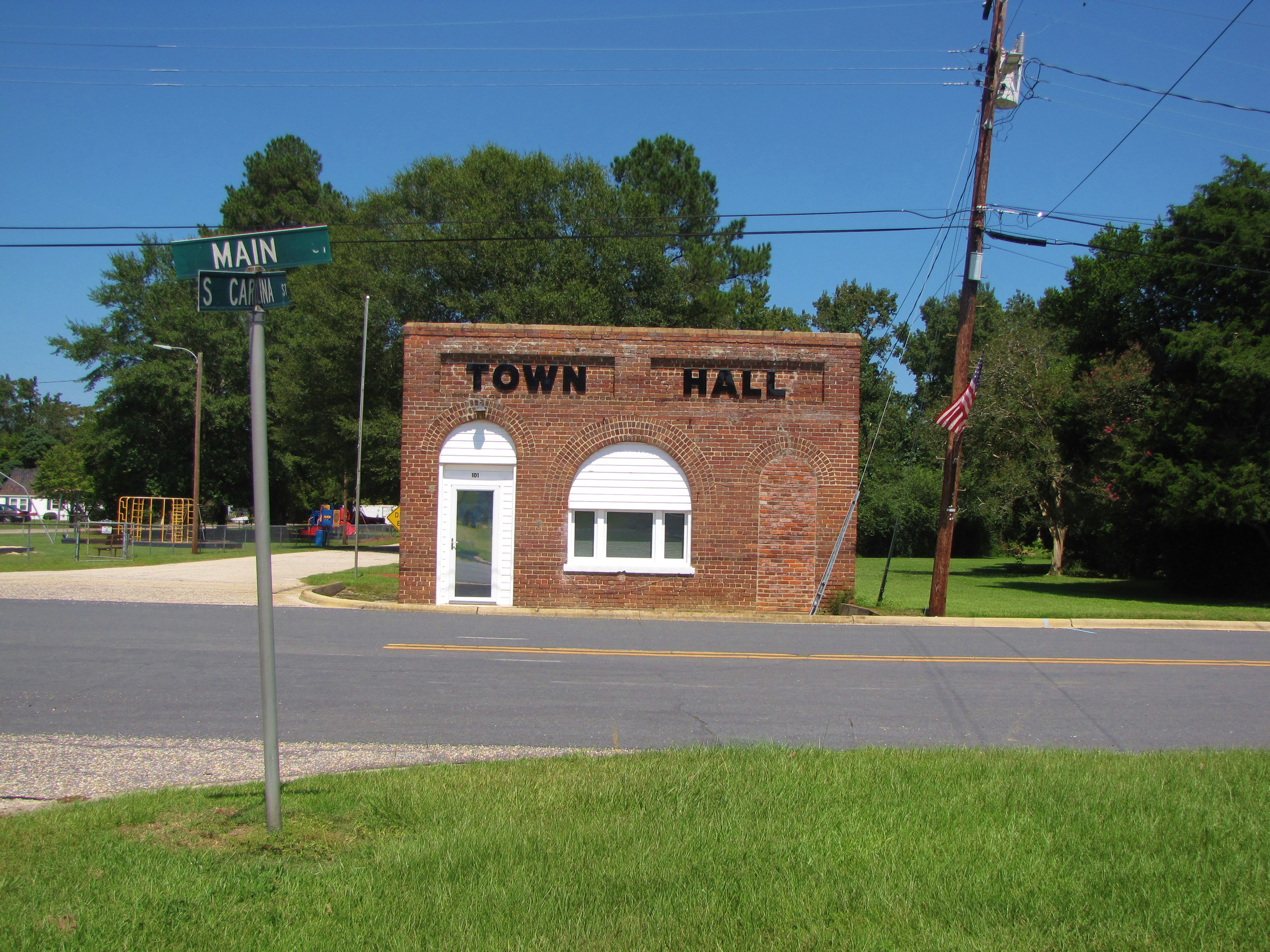
- Town Hall in Proctorville

- Location within the state of North Carolina
- Coordinates: 34°28′31″N 79°02′13″W
- Country: United States
- State: North Carolina
- County: Robeson

Government
  - Mayor: Allen Fowler

Area
  - Total: 0.46 sq mi (1.18 km^{2})
  - Land: 0.46 sq mi (1.18 km^{2})
  - Water: 0 sq mi (0.00 km^{2})
- Elevation: 112 ft (34 m)

Population (2020)
  - Total: 121
  - Density: 266.6/sq mi (102.93/km^{2})
- Time zone: UTC-5 (Eastern (EST))
  - Summer (DST): UTC-4 (EDT)
- ZIP code: 28375
- Area codes: 910, 472
- FIPS code: 37-53900
- GNIS feature ID: 2407163

Proctorville is a town in Robeson County, North Carolina, United States. The population was 121 at the 2020 census.

== History ==
Proctorville was settled in about 1870 and incorporated in 1913, being named for railway promotor Edward Knox Proctor Jr. The W.R. Surles Memorial Library was listed on the National Register of Historic Places in 2009.

== Geography ==
According to the United States Census Bureau, the town has a total area of 0.4 square miles (1.0 km^{2}), all land.

== Demographics ==
Historical population
Census	Pop.	Note	%±
1920	204		—
1930	185		−9.3%
1940	209		13.0%
1950	232		11.0%
1960	188		−19.0%
1970	157		−16.5%
1980	205		30.6%
1990	168		−18.0%
2000	133		−20.8%
2010	117		−12.0%
2020	121		3.4%
U.S. Decennial Census

As of the census of 2000, there were 133 people, 57 households, and 44 families residing in the town. The population density was 323.2 inhabitants per square mile (124.8/km^{2}). There were 61 housing units at an average density of 148.2 per square mile (57.2/km^{2}). The racial makeup of the town was 84.96% White, 10.53% African American and 4.51% Native American.

There were 57 households, out of which 28.1% had children under the age of 18 living with them, 59.6% were married couples living together, 15.8% had a female householder with no husband present, and 22.8% were non-families. 22.8% of all households were made up of individuals, and 10.5% had someone living alone who was 65 years of age or older. The average household size was 2.33 and the average family size was 2.70.

In the town, the population was spread out, with 19.5% under the age of 18, 6.8% from 18 to 24, 27.1% from 25 to 44, 32.3% from 45 to 64, and 14.3% who were 65 years of age or older. The median age was 43 years. For every 100 females there were 90.0 males. For every 100 females age 18 and over, there were 81.4 males.

The median income for a household in the town was $33,542, and the median income for a family was $34,167. Males had a median income of $28,438 versus $24,167 for females. The per capita income for the town was $15,206. There were 4.8% of families and 5.0% of the population living below the poverty line, including 5.0% of under eighteens and none of those over 64.
