= National Register of Historic Places listings in Robeson County, North Carolina =

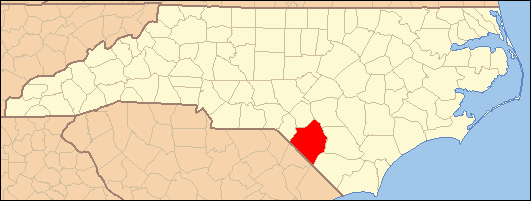

This list includes properties and districts listed on the National Register of Historic Places in Robeson County, North Carolina. Click the "Map of all coordinates" link to the right to view a Google map of all properties and districts with latitude and longitude coordinates in the table below.

== Current listings ==
This National Park Service list is complete through NPS recent listings posted March 14, 2025.

	Name on the Register	Image	Date listed	Location	City or town	Description
1	Asbury Methodist Church	Asbury Methodist Church	April 30, 2009 (#09000264)	Southeast side US 301 N., 0.1 miles (0.16 km) southwest of NC 1154; 34°34′29″N 79°11′32″W	Raynham	
2	Ashpole Presbyterian Church	Ashpole Presbyterian Church	October 19, 1982 (#82001302)	192 Ashpole Church Rd. 34°33′00″N 79°18′36″W	Rowland	
3	Baker Sanatorium	Baker Sanatorium	October 8, 1998 (#98001240)	207 E. 14th Street; 34°37′38″N 79°00′25″W	Lumberton	
4	Luther Henry Caldwell House	Luther Henry Caldwell House	September 18, 1978 (#78001971)	209 Caldwell St. 34°37′21″N 79°00′39″W	Lumberton	
5	Carolina Theatre	Carolina Theatre	July 9, 1981 (#81000426)	319 N. Chestnut St. 34°37′09″N 79°00′28″W	Lumberton	
6	Centenary Methodist Church	Centenary Methodist Church	April 10, 2007 (#07000294)	2585 NC 130 E, jct. with NC 2462; 34°29′33″N 79°15′06″W	Rowland	
7	Fairmont Commercial Historic District		April 7, 2010 (#10000163)	Bordered roughly by Byrd St. on the north, Walnut St. on the east, Red Cross St. on the south, & Alley St. on the west 34°29′52″N 79°06′48″W	Fairmont	
8	Former Pembroke High School		September 1, 1995 (#95001071)	East of the junction of Highway 711 and NC 1561; 34°41′10″N 79°12′16″W	Pembroke	
9	Humphrey-Williams Plantation		November 16, 1988 (#88002608)	West of Lumberton on NC 211, between SR 1001 and SR 1769; 34°42′08″N 79°03′41″W	Lumberton	Boundaries increased on November 16, 1988; the Greek Revival main house of this plantation was listed as the Humphrey-Williams House, with the boundary increase being the rest of the plantation
10	Lumberton Commercial Historic District	Lumberton Commercial Historic District	December 21, 1989 (#89002131)	Roughly Sixth St., Elm St., Fifth St., Chestnut St., Second St., Walnut St., Seaboard Coast Railroad tracks, & Water St. 34°37′08″N 79°00′32″W	Lumberton	
11	Flora MacDonald College	Flora MacDonald College	April 3, 1976 (#76001336)	College St. and 2nd Ave. 34°45′41″N 79°10′56″W	Red Springs	
12	Maxton Historic District	Maxton Historic District	February 12, 1999 (#99000199)	Roughly bounded by Graham St., Martin Luther King Dr., McCaskill St., and Florence St. 34°44′15″N 79°20′57″W	Maxton	
13	Kenneth McKinnon House		September 15, 2005 (#05001029)	South Side of NC 20, SE corner of NC 20 and NC 1907; 34°48′11″N 78°57′01″W	St. Pauls	
14	Old Main, the University of North Carolina at Pembroke	Old Main, the University of North Carolina at Pembroke	May 13, 1976 (#76001335)	West of the junction of NC 711 and SR 1340; 34°41′06″N 79°12′07″W	Pembroke	
15	Philadelphus Presbyterian Church	Philadelphus Presbyterian Church	October 3, 1975 (#75001287)	SR 1318 southwest of the junction with NC 72; 34°45′36″N 79°10′16″W	Philadelphus	
16	Planters Building	Planters Building	November 3, 1987 (#87001913)	308 N. Chestnut St. 34°37′09″N 79°00′27″W	Lumberton	
17	Robeson County Agricultural Building	Robeson County Agricultural Building	April 16, 2012 (#12000216)	108 W. 8th St. 34°37′22″N 79°00′33″W	Lumberton	
18	Rowland Depot	Rowland Depot	May 18, 2001 (#01000511)	W. Main St. and W. Railroad St. 34°32′12″N 79°17′35″W	Rowland	
19	Rowland Main Street Historic District	Rowland Main Street Historic District	February 2, 2005 (#04001582)	Roughly bounded by the 100 and 200 blocks of W. Main St., 100 blk of E. Main St., and Hickory and E and W Railroad Sts. 34°32′13″N 79°17′36″W	Rowland	
20	Alfred Rowland House	Alfred Rowland House	January 17, 2008 (#07001411)	1111 Carthage Rd. 34°37′50″N 79°01′03″W	Lumberton	
21	W.R. Surles Memorial Library	W.R. Surles Memorial Library	September 16, 2009 (#09000725)	105 W. Main St. 34°28′36″N 79°02′16″W	Proctorville	
22	US Post Office-Lumberton	US Post Office-Lumberton	March 6, 1985 (#85000483)	606 N. Elm St. 34°37′17″N 79°00′30″W	Lumberton	
23	Williams-Powell House		April 9, 1984 (#84002453)	SR 2256; 34°22′29″N 79°03′07″W	Orrum	

== See also ==
- National Register of Historic Places listings in North Carolina
- List of National Historic Landmarks in North Carolina
