= Asbury United Methodist Church =

Asbury United Methodist Church or Asbury Methodist Episcopal Church, or variations on Asbury Methodist Church, may refer to:

in the United States (by state then city)

- Asbury Methodist Church (Denver, Colorado), a Denver Landmark
- Asbury United Methodist Church (Durham, North Carolina)
- Old Asbury Methodist Church, Wilmington, Delaware, listed on the National Register of Historic Places (NRHP)
- Asbury Methodist Episcopal Church (Allen, Maryland), NRHP-listed
- Mount Vernon Place United Methodist Church and Asbury House, Baltimore, Maryland, NRHP-listed
- Asbury United Methodist Church (Chesterfield, New Hampshire), NRHP-listed
- Asbury United Methodist Church (Asbury, New Jersey), NRHP-listed
- New Asbury Methodist Episcopal Meetinghouse, Cape May Court House, New Jersey, NRHP-listed
- Asbury United Methodist Church and Bethel Chapel and Cemetery, Croton-on-Hudson, New York, NRHP-listed
- Asbury Methodist Church (Raynham, North Carolina), listed on the NRHP in Robeson County, North Carolina
- Asbury United Methodist Church (Savannah, Georgia), located in the NRHP-listed Savannah Victorian Historic District
- Asbury United Methodist Church (Tulsa, Oklahoma)
- Asbury United Methodist Church (Chattanooga, Tennessee)
- Asbury United Methodist Church (Knoxville, Tennessee), formerly Asbury Methodist Episcopal Church, South
- Asbury United Methodist Church (Washington, D.C.), NRHP-listed
- Asbury United Methodist Church (Raleigh, North Carolina), Raleigh, North Carolina, probably the most well-known Asbury United Methodist Church.
