= Littlefield High School =

Coordinates: 34.645339°N 78.917060°W

Littlefield High School is a former high school in Lumberton, North Carolina, in the Public Schools of Robeson County district. It opened in 1955; in 1991 it became Littlefield Middle School.

== History ==
Littlefield High School opened in 1955 as a four-year high school with 273 students from Allenton School, Barker Ten Mile School, and Smith's School. It was named for B. E. Littlefield, then Superintendent of Robeson County Schools, and located on 17.7 acres on North Carolina Highway 41 east of Lumberton. The building was enlarged in 1972 and an extension added in 1976 to house 7th- and 8th-grade students from Allenton and Smith's Schools; the school became Littlefield Junior-Senior High School.

In spring 1991 the district consolidated its high schools and the school became Littlefield Middle School; 9th-grade students moved to Lumberton Junior High School and 10th- to 12th-grade students to Lumberton Senior High School. Since fall 1991, it has housed grades 4 through 8.

== Athletics ==
Littlefield's sports teams were the Hornets. In 1965 they won the Region 2, Class A championship in football; there was no state championship at the time.
