= Kion Smith =

American football player (born 1998)

Profile
- Position: Guard

Personal information
- Born: October 7, 1998 (age 28); Lumberton, North Carolina, U.S.
- Listed height: 6 ft 5 in (1.96 m)
- Listed weight: 300 lb (136 kg)

Career information
- High school: Lumberton
- College: Fayetteville State (2016–2019)
- NFL draft: 2021: undrafted

Career history
- Atlanta Falcons (2021)*; Miami Dolphins (2021–2025); San Francisco 49ers (2026)*
- * Offseason or practice squad member only

Career NFL statistics as of 2026
- Games played: 23
- Games started: 2
- Stats at Pro Football Reference

Kion Smith (born October 7, 1998) is an American professional football guard. He played college football for the Fayetteville State Broncos.

== Early life and education ==
Smith played high school football at Lumberton High School. He was out for his entire senior season due to an injury.

Smith was at Fayetteville State University for his collegiate career. He played in 20 total games while he was there. His senior season was cancelled entirely due to the COVID-19 pandemic.

== Professional career ==
Pre-draft measurables
| Height | Weight | Arm length | Hand span | Wingspan | 40-yard dash | 10-yard split | 20-yard split | 20-yard shuttle | Three-cone drill | Vertical jump | Broad jump | Bench press |
|---|---|---|---|---|---|---|---|---|---|---|---|---|
| 6 ft 5 1/2 in (1.97 m) | 315 lb (143 kg) | 34 1/2 in (0.88 m) | 9 5/8 in (0.24 m) | 6 ft 9 1/4 in (2.06 m) | 5.33 s | 1.82 s | 3.06 s | 4.70 s | 7.70 s | 24.5 in (0.62 m) | 8 ft 0 in (2.44 m) | 15 reps |
All values from Pro Day

=== Atlanta Falcons ===
After going unselected in the 2021 NFL draft, Smith signed a contract with the Atlanta Falcons on May 4, 2021. However, he was not included on the team's final 53-man roster, and was waived on August 31.

=== Miami Dolphins ===
On September 6, 2021, Smith joined the Miami Dolphins' practice squad. He signed a reserve/future contract with the Dolphins on January 11, 2022. Smith was waived on August 30, and re-signed to the practice squad.

Smith signed a reserve/future contract with Miami on January 16, 2023. He played in his first nine games for the team that year, recording 70 offensive snaps.

On August 10, 2024, Smith was placed on season-ending injured reserve after suffering a torn ACL in the preseason.

On November 29, 2025, Smith was waived by the Dolphins, and re-signed to the practice squad. He had made 14 appearances (including two starts) for Miami. Smith signed a reserve/future contract with Miami on January 6, 2026.

On June 15, 2026, Smith was released by the Dolphins. Smith played in 23 career games with two starts at right guard in two seasons with the Dolphins.

=== San Francisco 49ers ===
On August 6, 2026, Smith signed with the San Francisco 49ers. On August 17, he was released by San Francisco.
