= St. Pauls, North Carolina =

- Town
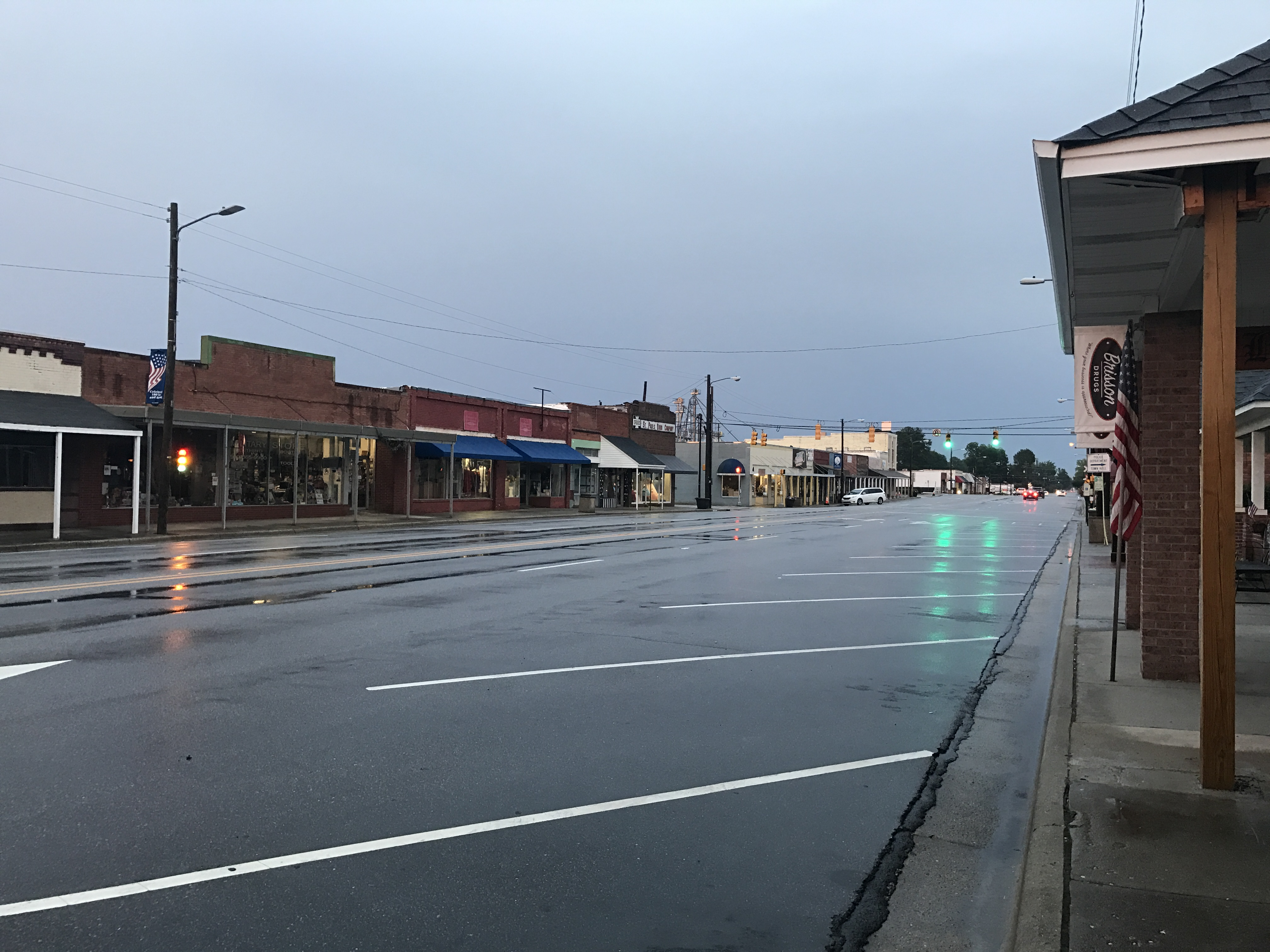
- A view of Broad Street in St. Pauls
- Nickname: Small Town With a Big Heart
- Motto: "Window of Economic Development"
- Location within the state of North Carolina
- Coordinates: 34°48′33″N 78°58′36″W
- Country: United States
- State: North Carolina
- County: Robeson
- Incorporated: 1909
- Named for: Local church

Government
  - Mayor: Jerry Weindel
  - Mayor Pro Tem: Evans Jackson
  - Town Administrator: Stephanie Dollinger
  - Chief Of Police: Michael Owens

Area
  - Total: 1.63 sq mi (4.22 km^{2})
  - Land: 1.63 sq mi (4.22 km^{2})
  - Water: 0 sq mi (0.00 km^{2})
- Elevation: 167 ft (51 m)

Population (2020)
  - Total: 2,045
  - Density: 1,256.4/sq mi (485.08/km^{2})
- Time zone: UTC-5 (Eastern (EST))
  - Summer (DST): UTC-4 (EDT)
- ZIP code: 28384
- Area codes: 910, 472
- FIPS code: 37-58720
- GNIS feature ID: 2407393
- Website: Town of St. Pauls

St. Pauls is a town in Robeson County, North Carolina, United States. The population was 2,045 at the 2020 census.

== History ==
The town of St. Pauls was built up around St. Pauls Presbyterian Church, which was built on land donated in 1799 by William Davis. St. Pauls grew slowly from a town of just the church, Davis' home, a post office, and a livery stable. The livery was built at the 16-mile post on the Fayetteville to Lumberton stage coach road. Growth began in earnest following the construction of the Robeson Institute, a co-educational school that served the children of northern Robeson County.

The construction of the Virginia and Carolina Southern Railway through St. Pauls helped establish the community as a leading producer of textiles. Three cotton mills were constructed in the early part of the 20th century. The mills experienced periods of success and failure before coming under the control of the Burlington Mills Corporation in 1943. The mills provided significant tax revenue to the town, at one point enabling it to supply free water, sewer, and trash services to residents. Nearly all the mills closed in the 1990s as the textile industry moved from the American South to Latin America and Southeast Asia. The closure of two yarn plants in 2001 led to the loss of over 500 jobs. In the 2000s the job market in the town stagnated, experiencing only minimal growth from the commercial sector developed near Interstate 95. In the 2010s the town secured multiple large corporate investments and relocations.

In 1969 St. Pauls' schools integrated. The former high school for African Americans became an elementary school.

== Sights ==
The Gilmore-Patterson Farm and Kenneth McKinnon House are listed on the National Register of Historic Places.

== Geography ==
According to the United States Census Bureau, the town has a total area of 1.3 square miles (3.4 km^{2}), all land.

== Demographics ==
Historical population
Census	Pop.	Note	%±
1910	419		—
1920	1,147		173.7%
1930	2,080		81.3%
1940	1,923		−7.5%
1950	2,251		17.1%
1960	2,249		−0.1%
1970	2,011		−10.6%
1980	1,639		−18.5%
1990	1,992		21.5%
2000	2,137		7.3%
2010	2,035		−4.8%
2020	2,045		0.5%
U.S. Decennial Census

=== 2020 census ===
As of the 2020 census, St. Pauls had a population of 2,045. The median age was 40.7 years. 25.2% of residents were under the age of 18 and 19.8% of residents were 65 years of age or older. For every 100 females there were 94.8 males, and for every 100 females age 18 and over there were 89.1 males age 18 and over.

0.0% of residents lived in urban areas, while 100.0% lived in rural areas.

There were 850 households in St. Pauls, including 463 families. Of all households, 31.9% had children under the age of 18 living in them, 35.1% were married-couple households, 22.7% were households with a male householder and no spouse or partner present, and 38.6% were households with a female householder and no spouse or partner present. About 36.9% of all households were made up of individuals and 19.4% had someone living alone who was 65 years of age or older.

There were 955 housing units, of which 11.0% were vacant. The homeowner vacancy rate was 0.4% and the rental vacancy rate was 6.3%.

St. Pauls racial composition
Race	Num.	Perc.
White (non-Hispanic)	865	42.3%
Black or African American (non-Hispanic)	346	16.92%
Native American	118	5.77%
Asian	8	0.39%
Pacific Islander	1	0.05%
Other/Mixed	77	3.77%
Hispanic or Latino	630	30.81%

=== 2010 census ===
As of the 2010 United States census, there were 2,035 people living in the town. The racial makeup of the town was 48.9% White, 18.5% Black, 5.4% Native American, 0.2% Asian, 0.1% Pacific Islander, 0.1% from some other race and 1.7% from two or more races. 25.1% were Hispanic or Latino of any race.

=== 2000 census ===
As of the census of 2000, there were 2,137 people, 859 households, and 571 families living in the town. The population density was 1,601.2 inhabitants per square mile (618.2/km^{2}). There were 935 housing units at an average density of 700.6 per square mile (270.5/km^{2}). The racial makeup of the town was 25.32% White, 60.46% African American, 3.56% Native American, 0.37% Asian, 0.05% Pacific Islander, 8.14% from other races, and 2.11% from two or more races. Hispanic or Latino of any race were 14.74% of the population.

29.8% of households had children under the age of 18 living with them, 41.9% were married couples living together, 17.5% had a female householder with no husband present, and 33.5% were non-families. 30.8% of all households were made up of individuals, and 14.7% had someone living alone who was 65 years of age or older. The average household size was 2.49 people and the average family size was 3.02 members.

The median income for a household in the town was $22,347, and the median income for a family was $27,708. Males had a median income of $27,218 versus $20,750 for females. The per capita income for the town was $12,520. About 17.2% of families and 22.8% of the population were below the poverty line, including 26.4% of those under age 18 and 24.9% of those age 65 or over.

The town has an elementary school, a middle school, and a high school, all named after St. Pauls. The population was spread out, with 25.8% under the age of 18, 10.7% from 18 to 24, 28.1% from 25 to 44, 21.8% from 45 to 64, and 13.7% who were 65 years of age or older. The median age was 35 years. There were 94.8 males for every 100 females, and 89.7 males for every 100 females age 18 and over.

== Education ==
Saint Pauls High School is in the town. In 2025, its student body was 45.1% Hispanic, 20.3% Black, 16.2% American Indian/Alaska Native, and 13.1% White. Bulldogs are the school's mascot.

== Sports ==
The Carolina Raging Wolves of the Women's Football Alliance played at St. Pauls High School, located in the town.

== Notable people ==
- John Beard, news anchor, was born in St. Pauls.
- Judy Clay, soul and gospel singer, was born in St. Pauls.

== Works cited ==
- Quinterno, John (February 2006). "Eastern North Carolina at Work: What are the region's economic engines?" (PDF). N.C. Insight. N.C. Center for Public Policy Research. pp. 2–37.
