= Sean Locklear =

American football player (born 1981)

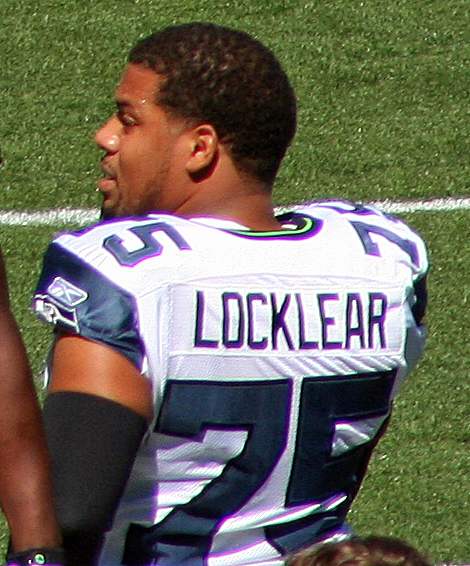
- Locklear with the Seattle Seahawks in 2010

No. 75, 74
- Position: Offensive tackle

Personal information
- Born: May 29, 1981 (age 45); Lumberton, North Carolina, U.S.
- Listed height: 6 ft 4 in (1.93 m)
- Listed weight: 310 lb (141 kg)

Career information
- High school: Lumberton
- College: NC State
- NFL draft: 2004: 3rd round, 84th overall pick

Career history
- Seattle Seahawks (2004–2010); Washington Redskins (2011); New York Giants (2012); Atlanta Falcons (2013)

Awards and highlights
- First-team All-ACC (2003)

Career NFL statistics
- Games played: 117
- Games started: 92
- Fumble recoveries: 5
- Stats at Pro Football Reference

Sean Hillary Locklear (born May 29, 1981) is an American former professional football player who was an offensive tackle in the National Football League (NFL). He was selected by the Seattle Seahawks in the third round of the 2004 NFL draft. He played college football for the NC State Wolfpack. Locklear was also a member of the Washington Redskins, New York Giants, and Atlanta Falcons.

== Professional career ==
Pre-draft measurables
Height	Weight	Arm length	Hand span	40-yard dash	10-yard split	20-yard split	20-yard shuttle	Three-cone drill	Vertical jump	Broad jump	Bench press
6 ft 4 in (1.93 m)	308 lb (140 kg)	31 3/4 in (0.81 m)	10 in (0.25 m)	5.17 s	1.75 s	2.99 s	4.56 s	7.85 s	29.0 in (0.74 m)	8 ft 4 in (2.54 m)	27 reps
All values from NFL Combine

=== Seattle Seahawks ===
He was selected with the 21st pick of the third round of the 2004 NFL draft out of North Carolina State University. Before the start of the 2005 season, he was moved to tackle when starter Floyd Womack was injured in the preseason.

On February 21, 2008, the Seahawks re-signed Locklear, keeping him away from the free agent market. Both sides agreed to a new 5-year extension worth a maximum value of $32 million and $12 million in bonuses.

=== Washington Redskins ===
On August 5, 2011, Locklear signed with the Washington Redskins.

=== New York Giants ===
On April 11, 2012, Locklear signed with the New York Giants.

=== Atlanta Falcons ===
On November 13, 2013, Locklear signed with the Atlanta Falcons on a one-year deal.
