= Red Springs High School =

Location
- 509 N Vance Street; Red Springs, North Carolina, US 28377
- 34.8231°N 79.1856°W

Information
- School type: Public
- Founded: 1890
- School district: Robeson County Schools
- NCES District ID: 3703930
- Superintendent: Freddie Williamson
- NCES School ID: 370393002239
- Principal: Steven Sinclair
- Grades: 9-12
- Enrollment: 867
- Student to teacher ratio: 18.05
- Colors: Red, Black
- Mascot: Red Devil
- Website: https://www.robeson.k12.nc.us/o/rshs

Red Springs High School (RSHS) is a public school in Red Springs, North Carolina, United States, serving grades 9 to 12. It is at 509 Vance Street. It is part of Public Schools of Robeson County.

== History ==
Red Springs High School first opened in 1890. By 1897, the school was averaging 100 students per year.

Schools in Red Springs were segregated and Red Springs Colored School served African American students. A high school program was added to it and was renamed in honor of principal John Truman Peterson in 1958. He retird in 1965 and the Red Springs School System was integrated in 1969.

In 1948, the start of the school year was delayed by a polio outbreak.

In 1998, the school received national attention after a student set the school on fire, causing $400,000 in damages.

== Demographics ==
The student body had a mix of Native American, Hispanic, and Black students as well as 3.6 percent white students in 2025.

== Athletics ==
Red Devils are the mascot. In 1999 a football stadium and fieldhouse were built for the school. It also has a track and tennis courts.

== Alumni ==
- Taquan "T.J." Ellerbe

== See also ==
- Public Schools of Robeson County
- North Carolina High School Athletic Association
- List of high schools in North Carolina
