= Public Schools of Robeson County =

School district in North Carolina, USA

Public Schools of Robeson County is a school district headquartered in Lumberton, North Carolina. It operates public schools in Robeson County, with its jurisdiction being the county. As of 2019 the district had about 23,000 students.

== Schools ==
=== Secondary schools ===
High schools

- Fairmont High School
- Lumberton High School
- Purnell Swett High School
- Red Springs High School
- St. Pauls High School
- Robeson Early College High School

Middle schools

- Fairmont Middle School
- L. Gilbert Carroll Middle School
- Littlefield Middle School (see Littlefield High School)
- Lumberton Jr. High School
- Orrum Middle School
- Pembroke Middle School
- Red Springs Middle School
- South Robeson Middle School
- St. Pauls Middle School
- Townsend Middle School

=== Primary schools ===
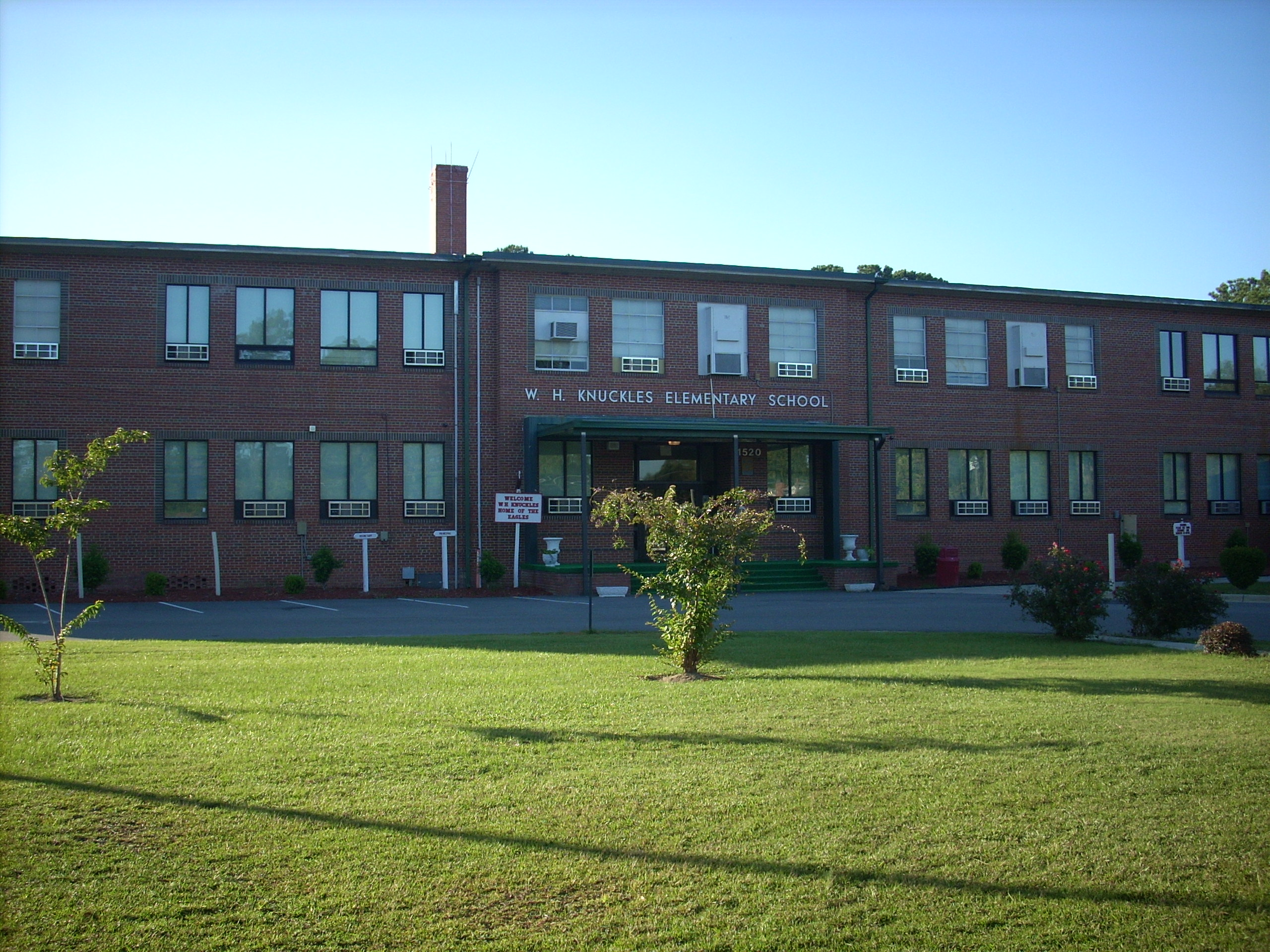
W.H. Knuckles Elementary School in Lumberton

- Deep Branch Elementary School
- East Robeson Elementary School
- Green Grove Elementary School
- W.H. Knuckles Elementary School
- Long Branch Elementary School
- Magnolia Elementary School
- Rowland Norment Elementary School
- Oxendine Elementary School
- Parkton Elementary School
- Pembroke Elementary School
- Peterson Elementary School
- Piney Grove Elementary School
- Prospect Elementary School
- Rex-Rennert Elementary School
- Rosenwald Elementary School
- St. Pauls Elementary School
- Tanglewood Elementary School
- Union Chapel Elementary School
- Union Elementary School

=== Other facilities ===
- Career Center
- Indian Education Resource Center
- Learning Accelerated Program
- PSRC Online
- Shining Stars Preschool

== Facilities ==
The headquarters was located in the Comtech Technology Park in Lumberton, along Interstate 95. It previously had a different office, but Hurricane Matthew damaged the facilities in 2016. The University of North Carolina Pembroke temporarily hosted the finance department of the school district. The headquarters is currently located at 100 Hargrave St, Lumberton, NC 28358.
