= Gilmore–Patterson Farm =

Historic farm in North Carolina, United States

- U.S. National Register of Historic Places
- Location within North Carolina Location within the United States
- Location: 20337 NC 87 W, near St. Pauls, North Carolina
- Coordinates: 34.80619°N 78.83051°W
- Area: 120 acres (49 ha)
- Built: c. 1868, c. 1872
- Architectural style: Greek Revival, Queen Anne
- NRHP reference No.: 99000912
- Added to NRHP: July 28, 1999

Gilmore–Patterson Farm is a historic home and farm located near St. Pauls, Bladen County, North Carolina. The Patterson farmhouse was built about 1872 in the late Greek Revival style, and modified about 1890 in the Queen Anne style. It is a frame one-story dwelling with a central hall plan. Also on the property are the contributing a smokehouse, an outhouse, a (former) post office, a mule barn, three tobacco barns, a garage, a granary, and two tenant houses.

It was added to the National Register of Historic Places in 1999.
