= Donnell Thompson =

American football player (1958–2024)

No. 99
- Position: Defensive end

Personal information
- Born: October 27, 1958; Lumberton, North Carolina, U.S.
- Died: September 17, 2024 (aged 65)
- Listed height: 6 ft 4 in (1.93 m)
- Listed weight: 270 lb (122 kg)

Career information
- High school: Lumberton
- College: North Carolina
- NFL draft: 1981: 1st round, 18th overall pick

Career history
- Baltimore/Indianapolis Colts (1981–1991)

Awards and highlights
- PFWA All-Rookie Team (1981); First-team All-ACC (1980)

Career NFL statistics
- Sacks: 41
- Fumble recoveries: 8
- Touchdowns: 1
- Stats at Pro Football Reference

Larry Donnell Thompson (October 27, 1958 – September 17, 2024) was an American professional football player who was a defensive end for the Baltimore/Indianapolis Colts of the National Football League (NFL). Thompson played college football for the North Carolina Tar Heels.

After leaving the NFL, Thompson became a franchisee for McDonald's in Atlanta, Georgia. He purchased his own franchise in 1998 and later opened franchises for Choice Hotels International, Zaxby's, Denny's and Checkers Drive-In, sometimes in partnership with his former roommate Ron Wooten. Thompson died on September 17, 2024, at the age of 65.
