= Alfred Rowland House =

Historic house in North Carolina, United States

- U.S. National Register of Historic Places
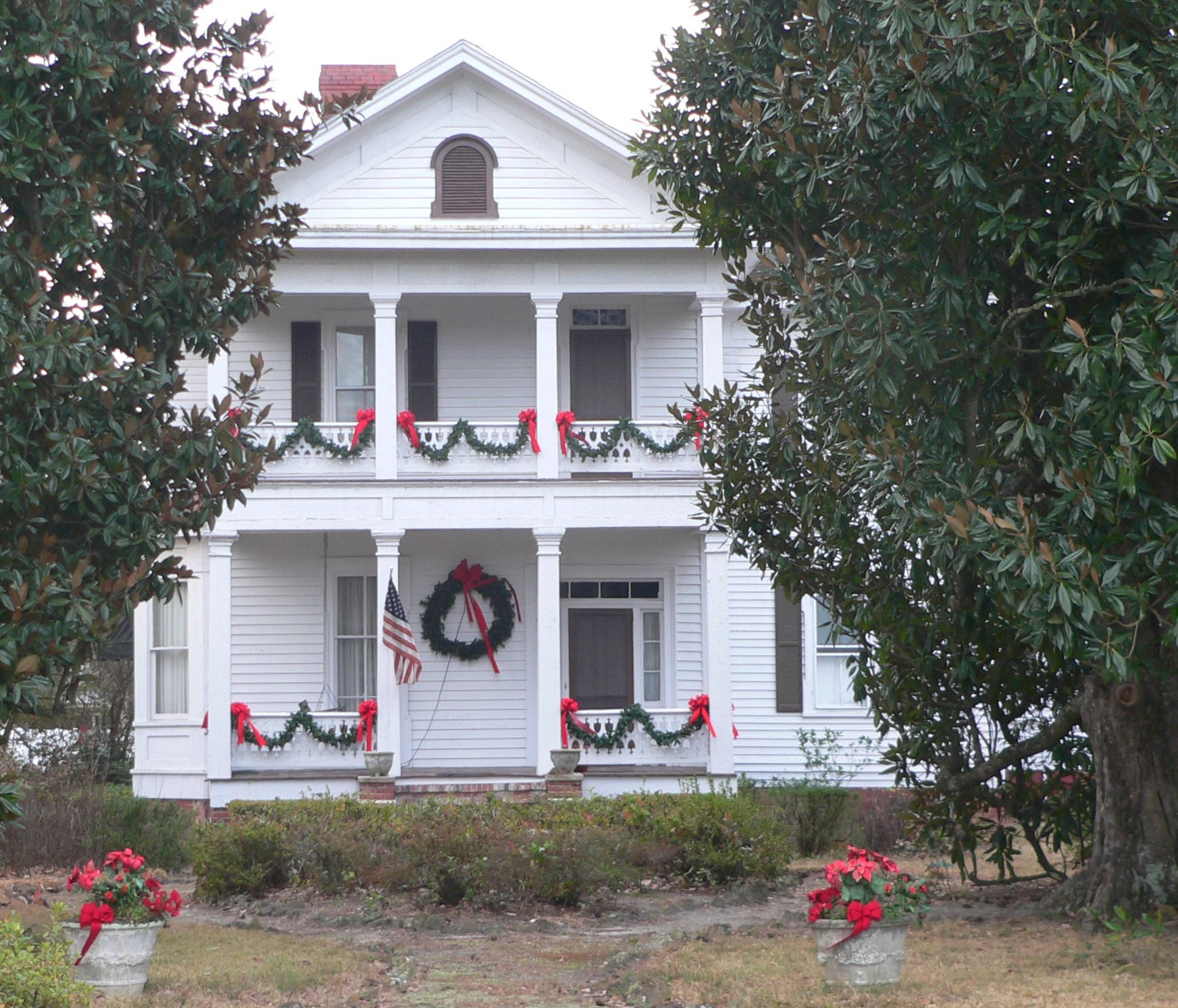
- Alfred Rowland house, December 2014

- Location within North Carolina Location within the United States
- Location: 1111 Carthage Rd., Lumberton, North Carolina
- Coordinates: 34°37′50″N 79°01′03″W
- Area: 1.7 acres (0.69 ha)
- Built: c. 1875-1880
- Architectural style: Italianate, Greek Revival
- NRHP reference No.: 07001411
- Added to NRHP: January 17, 2008

Alfred Rowland House, also known as Riverwood, is a historic home located at Lumberton, Robeson County, North Carolina. It was built between 1875 and 1880, and is a two-story, cross-gable, side-hall plan, transitional Italianate / Greek Revival style frame dwelling. The front facade features an engaged, double-tier, pedimented porch.

It was added to the National Register of Historic Places in 2008.
