= Williams–Powell House =

Historic house in North Carolina, United States

- U.S. National Register of Historic Places
- Location within North Carolina Location within the United States
- Location: SR 2256, near Orrum, North Carolina
- Coordinates: 34°22′29″N 79°03′07″W
- Area: 115 acres (47 ha)
- Built: c. 1830
- Architectural style: Greek Revival, Federal
- NRHP reference No.: 84002453
- Added to NRHP: April 9, 1984

The Williams–Powell House is a historic plantation house located at Orrum, Robeson County, North Carolina. It was built about 1830, and is a two-story, frame dwelling with a rear kitchen ell, in a transitional Federal / Greek Revival style. It has a gable roof and flanking exterior end chimneys. The front facade features a free-standing two-story portico, which shelters the first and second story porches.

It was added to the National Register of Historic Places in 1984.
