= Kenneth McKinnon House =

Historic house in North Carolina, United States

- U.S. National Register of Historic Places
- Location within North Carolina Location within the United States
- Location: South Side of NC 20, SE corner of NC 20 and NC 1907, near St. Pauls, North Carolina
- Coordinates: 34°48′11″N 78°57′01″W
- Area: less than one acre
- Built: c. 1840
- Built by: John and Kenneth McKinnon
- Architectural style: Greek Revival
- NRHP reference No.: 05001029
- Added to NRHP: September 15, 2005

Kenneth McKinnon House, also known as the McKinnon-McArthur-Kinlaw-Johnson House, is a historic home located near St. Pauls, Robeson County, North Carolina. It was built about 1840, and is a two-story, timber frame dwelling with Greek Revival style interior design elements. It rests on a brick pier foundation, has a side-gable roof, and exterior end chimneys. At the rear is a one-story end-gable kitchen/dining room addition. The front facade features an overhanging second story, thereby creating a full-width, recessed first-story porch.

It was added to the National Register of Historic Places in 2005.
