= United States Post Office (Lumberton, North Carolina) =

- US Post Office-Lumberton
- U.S. National Register of Historic Places
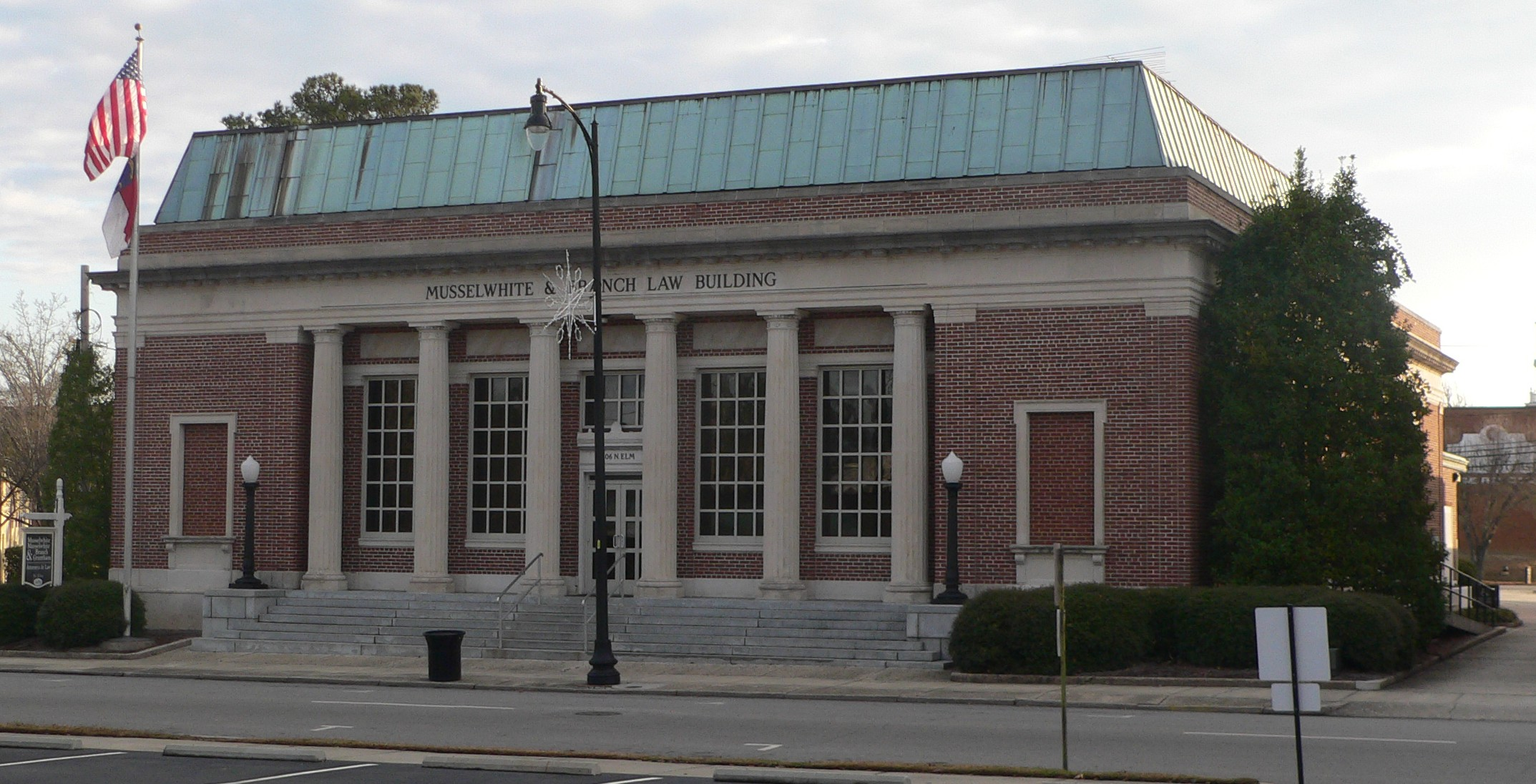
- Former US Post Office-Lumberton, December 2014

- Location within North Carolina Location within the United States
- Location: 606 N. Elm St., Lumberton, North Carolina
- Coordinates: 34°37′16″N 79°0′30″W
- Area: less than one acre
- Built: 1931
- Architect: Office of the Supervising Architect under James A. Wetmore
- Architectural style: Beaux Arts
- NRHP reference No.: 85000483
- Added to NRHP: March 6, 1985

US Post Office-Lumberton, also known as the Lumberton N.C. Post Office, is a historic post office building located at Lumberton, Robeson County, North Carolina. It was designed by the Office of the Supervising Architect under James A. Wetmore and built in 1931. It is a 1 1/2-story, Beaux Arts-style brick building with a rear addition built in 1965. It has been renovated and houses law offices.

It was added to the National Register of Historic Places in 1985.
