= Humphrey–Williams Plantation =

Historic farm in North Carolina, United States

- U.S. National Register of Historic Places
- U.S. Historic district
- Location within North Carolina Location within the United States
- Location: West of Lumberton on NC 211, between SR 1001 and SR 1769, Lumberton, North Carolina
- Coordinates: 34°42′8″N 79°3′41″W
- Area: 566.6 acres (229.3 ha)
- Built: c. 1784, c. 1846
- Architectural style: Greek Revival, Vernacular Greek Revival
- NRHP reference No.: 73001367 (original); 88002608 (increase)

Significant dates
- Added to NRHP: July 24, 1973 (original)
- Boundary increase: November 16, 1988 (increase)

The Humphrey–Williams Plantation (also known as the Humphrey–Williams–Smith House and Plantation) is a historic plantation complex located near Lumberton, Robeson County, North Carolina. The Humphrey–Williams House was built about 1846 with the forced labor of enslaved people, and is a two-story, five-bay, vernacular Greek Revival style frame farmhouse. It features a one-story, full-width shed porch. Also on the property are the contributing William Humphrey House (c. 1784), Annie Fairly's House (c. 1935), tobacco barn (c. 1900), a carriage house (c. 1900), a smokehouse, a store-post office (1835–1856), and the agricultural landscape.

The main house, on a 9-acre (3.6 ha) property, was listed on the National Register of Historic Places in 1973, as Humphrey–Williams House. The larger plantation, including 5 contributing buildings and 1 additional contributing site on a 566.6-acre (229.3 ha) property, was re-listed in a boundary increase listing in 1988.
