= Luther Henry Caldwell House =

Historic house in North Carolina, United States

- U.S. National Register of Historic Places
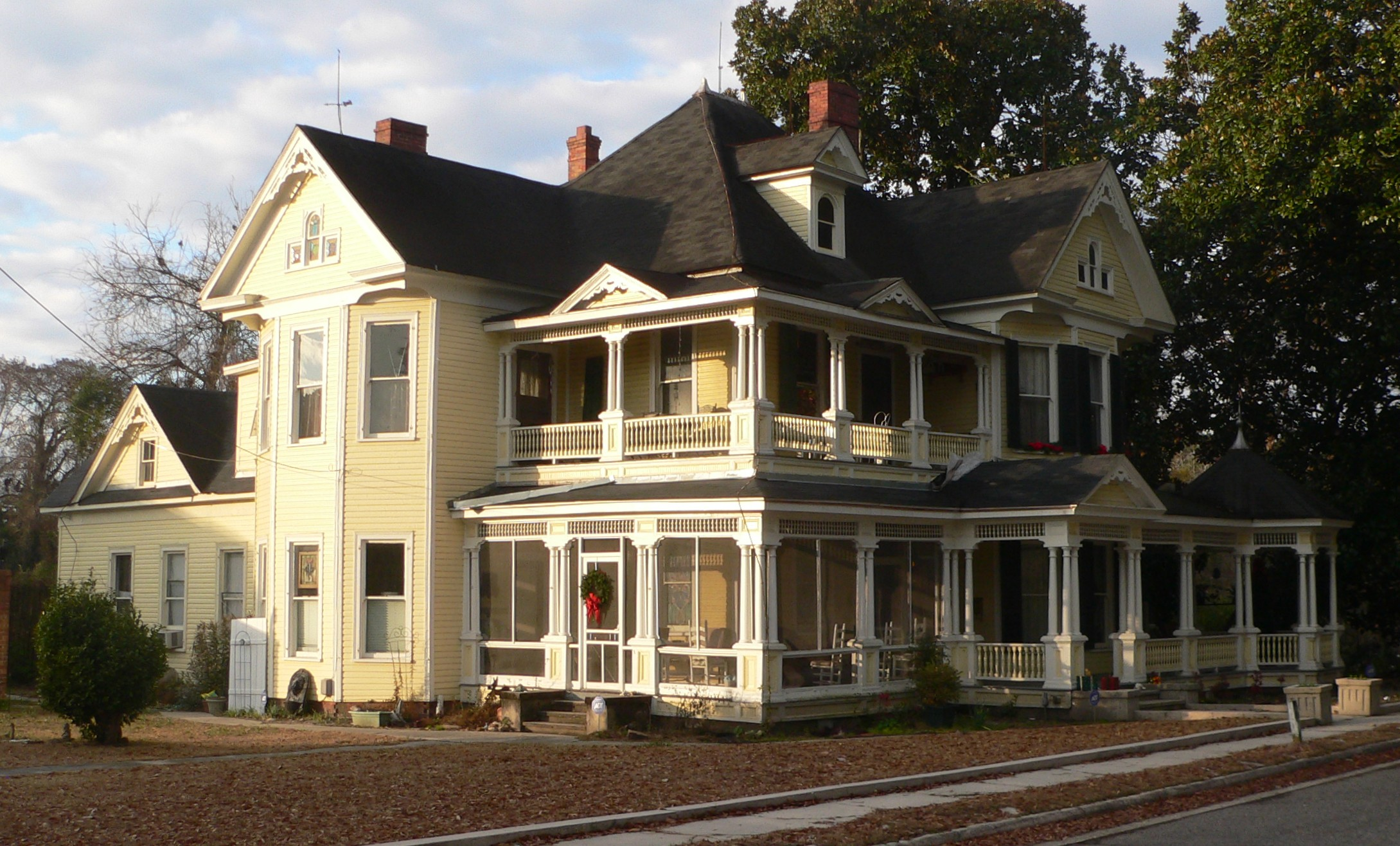
- Luther Henry Caldwell house, December 2014

- Location within North Carolina Location within the United States
- Location: 209 Caldwell St., Lumberton, North Carolina
- Coordinates: 34°37′21″N 79°0′39″W
- Area: 0.8 acres (0.32 ha)
- Built: 1893-1903
- Architectural style: Queen Anne
- NRHP reference No.: 78001971
- Added to NRHP: September 18, 1978

Luther Henry Caldwell House is a historic home located at Lumberton, Robeson County, North Carolina. It was built between 1893 and 1903, and is a large two-story, eclectic Queen Anne style frame dwelling. It features a double tier wraparound porch with an octagonal pavilion and decorative woodwork on the porches, bayed gable end projections, and gable fronts. It was the home of Luther Henry Caldwell, an important business and social leader in Lumberton.

It was added to the National Register of Historic Places in 1978.
