= Raynham, North Carolina =

- Town
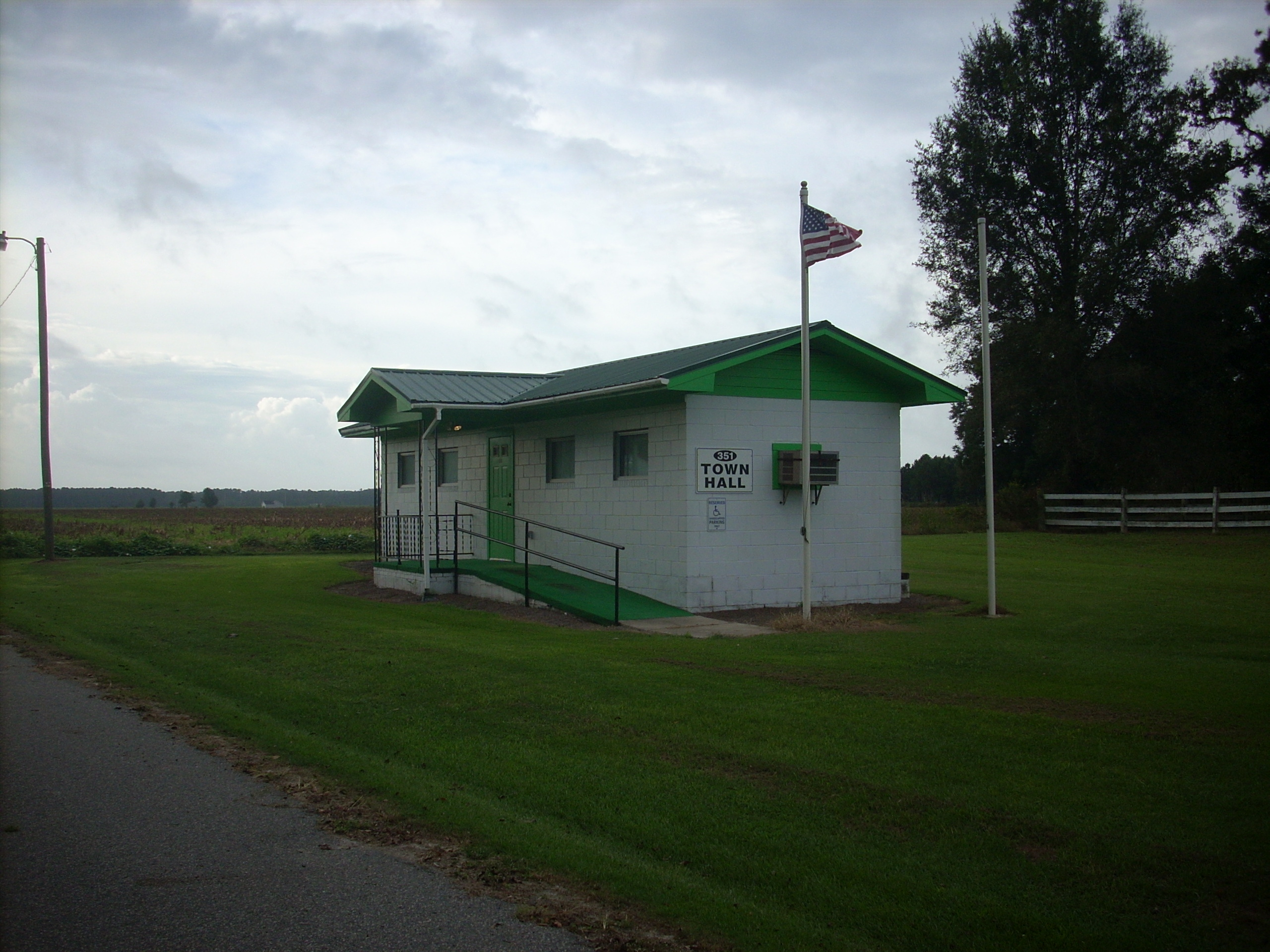
- Town hall in Raynham

- Location within the state of North Carolina
- Coordinates: 34°34′34″N 79°11′27″W
- Country: United States
- State: North Carolina
- County: Robeson

Government
  - Mayor: Debra Arnette

Area
  - Total: 0.12 sq mi (0.32 km^{2})
  - Land: 0.12 sq mi (0.32 km^{2})
  - Water: 0 sq mi (0.00 km^{2})
- Elevation: 148 ft (45 m)

Population (2020)
  - Total: 60
  - Density: 493.0/sq mi (190.35/km^{2})
- Time zone: UTC-5 (Eastern (EST))
  - Summer (DST): UTC-4 (EDT)
- ZIP code: 28383
- Area codes: 910, 472
- FIPS code: 37-55340
- GNIS feature ID: 2407180

Raynham is a town in Robeson County, North Carolina, United States. The population was 60 at the 2020 census.

== History ==
Raynham was settled in about 1884 and was named in homage to Raynham, Norfolk, where one of the early settler families had come from. The Asbury Methodist Church was listed on the National Register of Historic Places in 2009.

== Geography ==
According to the United States Census Bureau, the town has a total area of 0.2 square miles (0.52 km^{2}), all land.

== Demographics ==
Historical population
Census	Pop.	Note	%±
1980	83		—
1990	106		27.7%
2000	67		−36.8%
2010	72		7.5%
2020	60		−16.7%
U.S. Decennial Census

As of the census of 2000, there were 67 people, 27 households, and 21 families residing in the town. The population density was 375.0 inhabitants per square mile (144.8/km^{2}). There were 28 housing units at an average density of 156.7 per square mile (60.5/km^{2}). The racial makeup of the town was 70.15% White, 5.97% African American and 23.88% Native American.

There were 27 households, out of which 29.6% had children under the age of 18 living with them, 63.0% were married couples living together, 7.4% had a female householder with no husband present, and 22.2% were non-families. 14.8% of all households were made up of individuals, and 3.7% had someone living alone who was 65 years of age or older. The average household size was 2.48 and the average family size was 2.81.

In the town, the population was spread out, with 20.9% under the age of 18, 4.5% from 18 to 24, 31.3% from 25 to 44, 23.9% from 45 to 64, and 19.4% who were 65 years of age or older. The median age was 41 years. For every 100 females, there were 81.1 males. For every 100 females age 18 and over, there were 96.3 males.

The median income for a household in the town was $46,250, and the median income for a family was $46,563. Males had a median income of $32,188 versus $16,875 for females. The per capita income for the town was $23,383. There were 16.0% of families and 18.4% of the population living below the poverty line, including 42.1% of under eighteens and none of those over 64.
