= Planters Building =

Historic building in North Carolina, US

- U.S. National Register of Historic Places
- U.S. Historic district – Contributing property
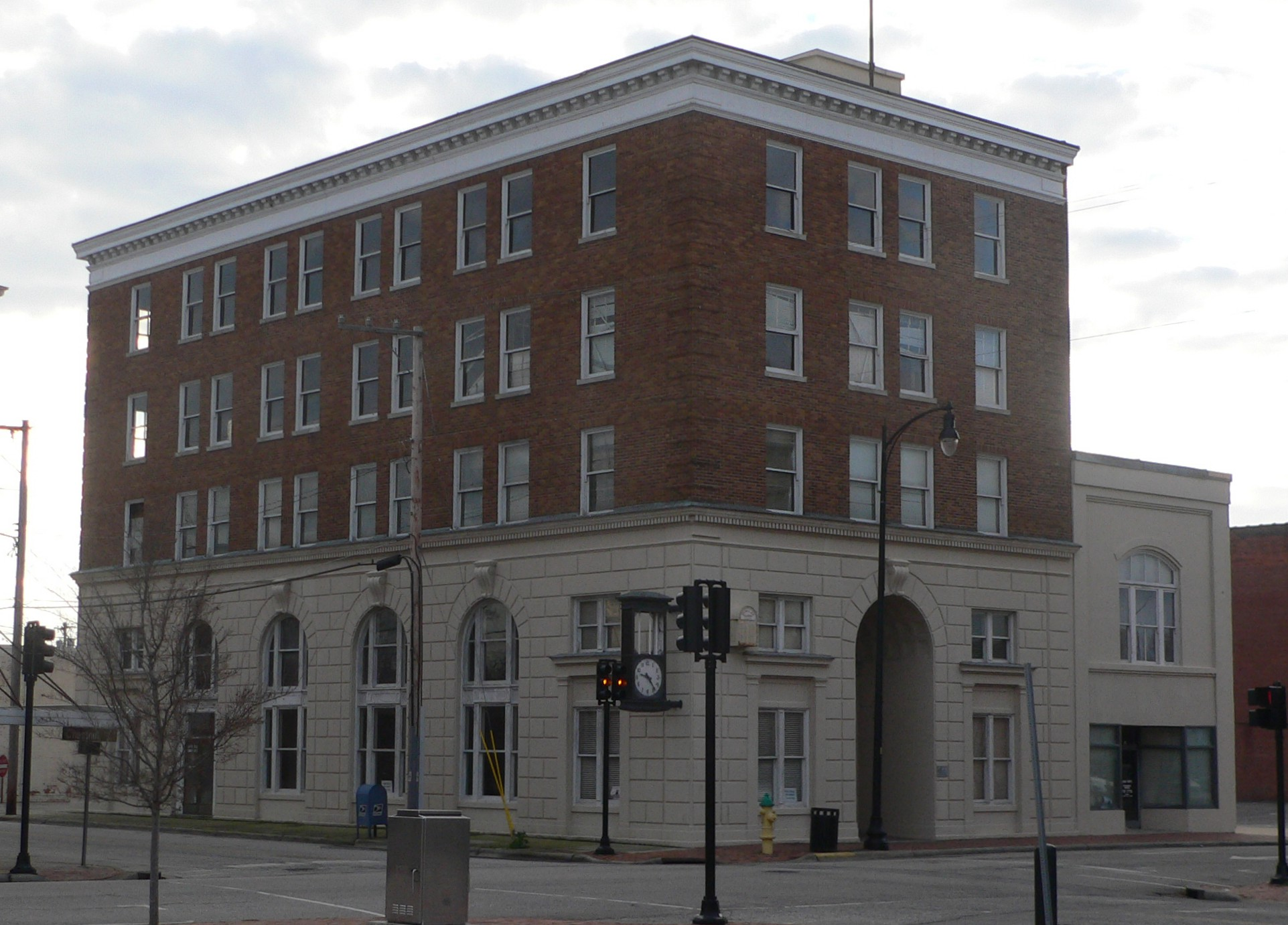
- Planters Bldg, December 2014

- Location within North Carolina Location within the United States
- Location: 312 N. Chestnut St., Lumberton, North Carolina
- Coordinates: 34°37′8″N 79°0′28″W
- Area: less than one acre
- Built: 1925-1926
- Architect: Wilson, Berryman & Kennedy
- Architectural style: Classical Revival
- NRHP reference No.: 87001913
- Added to NRHP: November 3, 1987

Planters Building, also known as the First Union Bank Building, is a historic office building located at Lumberton, Robeson County, North Carolina. It was designed by the firm of Wilson, Berryman & Kennedy and built in 1925–1926. It is a five-story, Classical Revival-style steel frame building sheathed in brick and rusticated cast concrete. The ground levels feature round arched windows and the main entrance is reached through a barrel-arched, coffered vault. Attached to the corner of the building is an original rectangular iron-cased clock.

It was added to the National Register of Historic Places in 1987. It is located in the Lumberton Commercial Historic District on the southeast corner of Chestnut and 4th Streets.
