= Lumberton High School (North Carolina) =

American public school in North Carolina

Location
- 3901 Fayetteville Rd; Lumberton, North Carolina 28358; United States; 34°38′48″N 78°59′55″W

Information
- School type: Public
- Established: 1906 (120 years ago)
- School district: Public Schools of Robeson County
- CEEB code: 342435
- Principal: Larry Brooks II
- Teaching staff: 115.61 (FTE)
- Grades: 9–12
- Enrollment: 1,894 (2024–2025)
- Student to teacher ratio: 16.38
- Colors: Maroon and gold
- Athletics: NCHSAA 7A
- Athletics conference: Tri-County 6A/7A
- Team name: Pirates
- Website: www.robeson.k12.nc.us/o/lshs

Lumberton Senior High School is a high school located in Lumberton, North Carolina, serving grades 9–12. It is run by the Public Schools of Robeson County, as it is in Robeson County, North Carolina.

== Notable alumni ==
- Brad Allen — NFL referee
- Penny Fuller — actress
- Yolanda Jones – Puerto Rico women's national basketball team member
- Sean Locklear – NFL offensive tackle
- Mike McIntyre – represented North Carolina's 7th Congressional District in the U.S. House of Representatives
- Kion Smith – NFL offensive lineman
- Jamain Stephens – NFL offensive tackle
- Donnell Thompson – NFL defensive end
- Tim Worley – NFL running back, played for the Georgia Bulldogs in college
