= Baker Sanatorium =

Historic building in North Carolina, US

- U.S. National Register of Historic Places
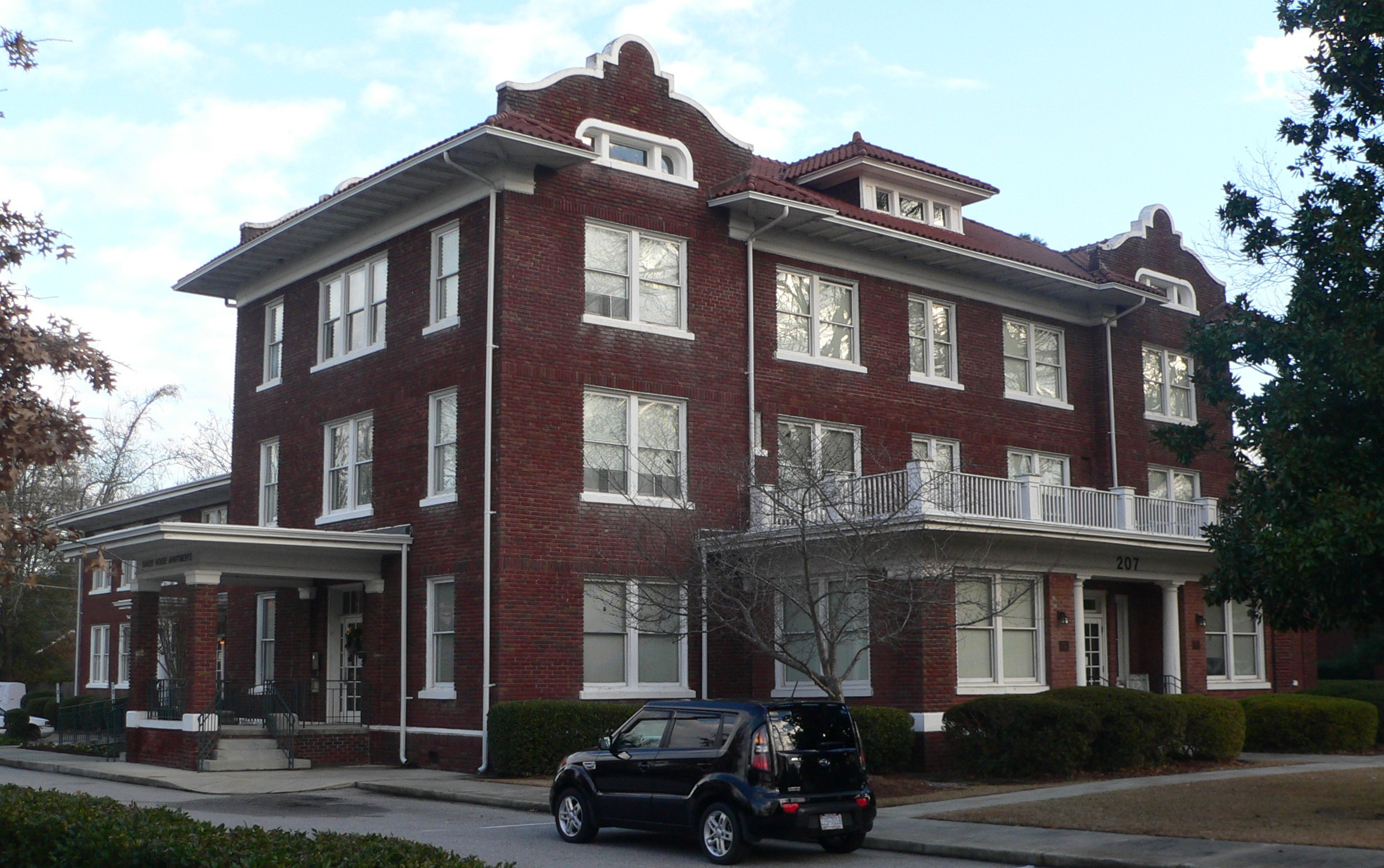
- Baker Sanatorium, December 2014

- Location within North Carolina Location within the United States
- Location: Jct. of 14th and Chestnut Sts., Lumberton, North Carolina
- Coordinates: 34°37′38″N 79°0′25″W
- Area: 1.2 acres (0.49 ha)
- Built: 1920-1921
- Built by: Burney Bros.
- Architect: McCarl, Roger C.
- Architectural style: Mission/spanish Revival
- NRHP reference No.: 98001240
- Added to NRHP: October 8, 1998

Baker Sanatorium is a historic sanatorium in Lumberton, Robeson County, North Carolina. It is named for Dr Horace M Baker, who opened the hospital in 1921. The sanatorium was built in 1920–1921, and is a 3 1/2-story, five-bay, T-shaped Mission Revival-style brick building. The building features an arcaded porch, and the roofs are sheathed in terra cotta mission tiles. The hospital continued in operation until 1993. It has been converted to apartments.

It was added to the National Register of Historic Places in 1998.
