= Carolina Theatre (Lumberton, North Carolina) =

- U.S. National Register of Historic Places
- U.S. Historic district – Contributing property
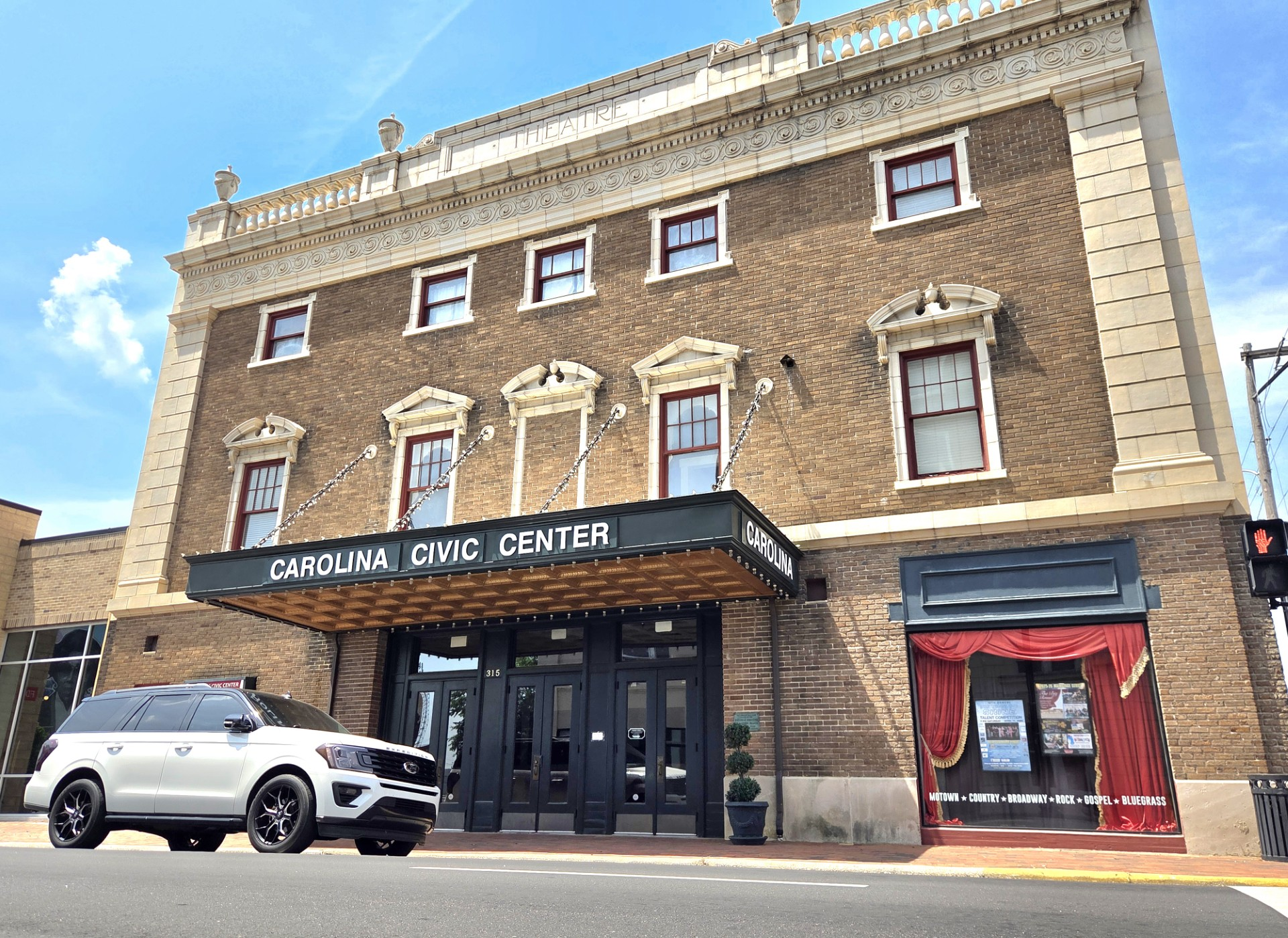
- Carolina Civic Center, December 2014

- Location within North Carolina Location within the United States
- Location: 319 N. Chestnut St., Lumberton, North Carolina
- Coordinates: 34°37′9″N 79°0′30″W
- Area: less than one acre
- Built: 1927-1928
- Built by: Underwood, U.A., Construction Co.
- Architect: Dixon, S.S.
- Architectural style: Italian Renaissance
- NRHP reference No.: 81000426
- Added to NRHP: July 9, 1981

Carolina Theatre, also known as the Carolina Civic Center, is a historic movie theater located at Lumberton, Robeson County, North Carolina. It was built in 1927–1928, and is a three-story, Italian Renaissance style brick and terra cotta building. The theatre closed in 1975 amid a general exodus of businesses from downtown Lumberton. Plans were made to demolish it and build a parking lot, but community activists lobbied to have the building spared. It was reopened as the Carolina Civic Center in 1985 and underwent renovations in 2008.

It was added to the National Register of Historic Places in 1981. It is located in the Lumberton Commercial Historic District at 319 North Chestnut Street.
