= Lumberton Commercial Historic District =

Historic district in North Carolina, United States

- U.S. National Register of Historic Places
- U.S. Historic district
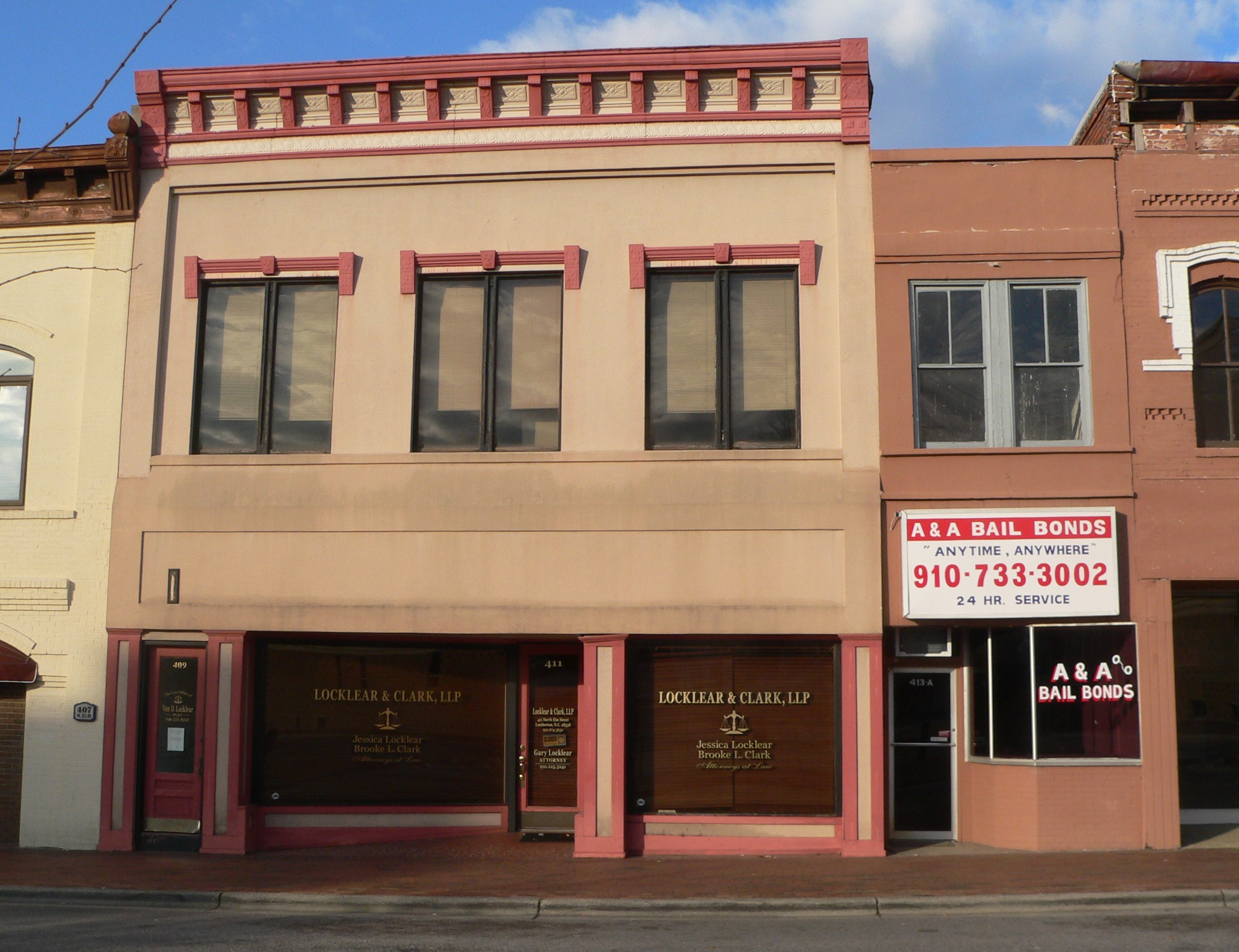
- Lumberton Commercial Historic District, December 2014

- Location within North Carolina Location within the United States
- Location: Roughly Sixth St., Elm St., Fifth St., Chestnut St., Second St., Walnut St., Seaboard Coast Railroad tracks, & Water St., Lumberton, North Carolina
- Coordinates: 34°37′08″N 79°00′32″W
- Area: 21.5 acres (8.7 ha)
- Architect: Multiple
- Architectural style: Early Commercial, Classical Revival, Moderne
- NRHP reference No.: 89002131
- Added to NRHP: December 21, 1989

Lumberton Commercial Historic District is a national historic district located at Lumberton, Robeson County, North Carolina. The district encompasses 64 contributing buildings and 1 contributing site in the central business district of Lumberton. It includes buildings built between about 1840 to 1941 in a variety of popular architectural styles including Classical Revival and Streamline Moderne. Located in the district are the separately listed Carolina Theatre and Planters Building. Other notable buildings include the Proctor Law Office (c. 1840), McLeod Building (1879), (former) National Hotel, (former) Efird's Department Store, Huggins Star Shoe Shop (c. 1895), National Bank of Lumberton (1914), Dresden Cotton Mills Office Building, (former) Lumberton Municipal Building (1917), and Stephens Funeral Home (1936).

It was added to the National Register of Historic Places in 1989.
