= Robeson County Agricultural Building =

Historic building in North Carolina, US

- U.S. National Register of Historic Places
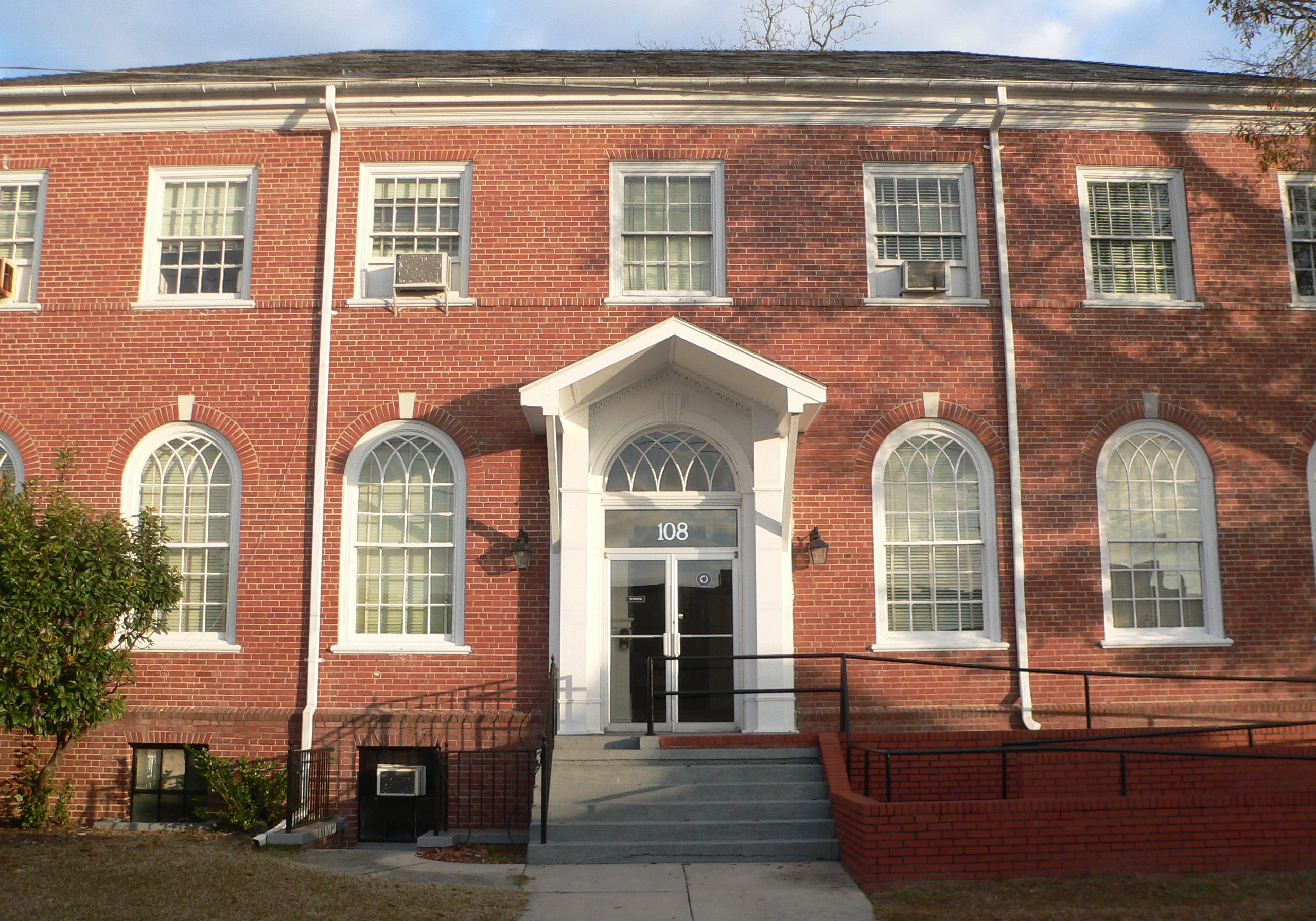
- Robeson County Agricultural Building, December 2014

- Location within North Carolina Location within the United States
- Location: 108 W. 8th St., Lumberton, North Carolina
- Coordinates: 34°37′22″N 79°00′33″W
- Area: 1 acre (0.40 ha)
- Built: 1937
- Architect: Weeks, Howard Raymond; Atwood, Thomas C.
- Architectural style: Colonial Revival
- NRHP reference No.: 12000216
- Added to NRHP: April 16, 2012

Robeson County Agricultural Building is a historic government office building located at Lumberton, Robeson County, North Carolina. It was built in 1937 as a Works Progress Administration project. It is a two-story, T-shaped Colonial Revival-style brick building on a raised basement.

It was added to the National Register of Historic Places in 2012.
