= Old Asbury Methodist Church =

Historic church in Wilmington, Delaware

- U.S. National Register of Historic Places
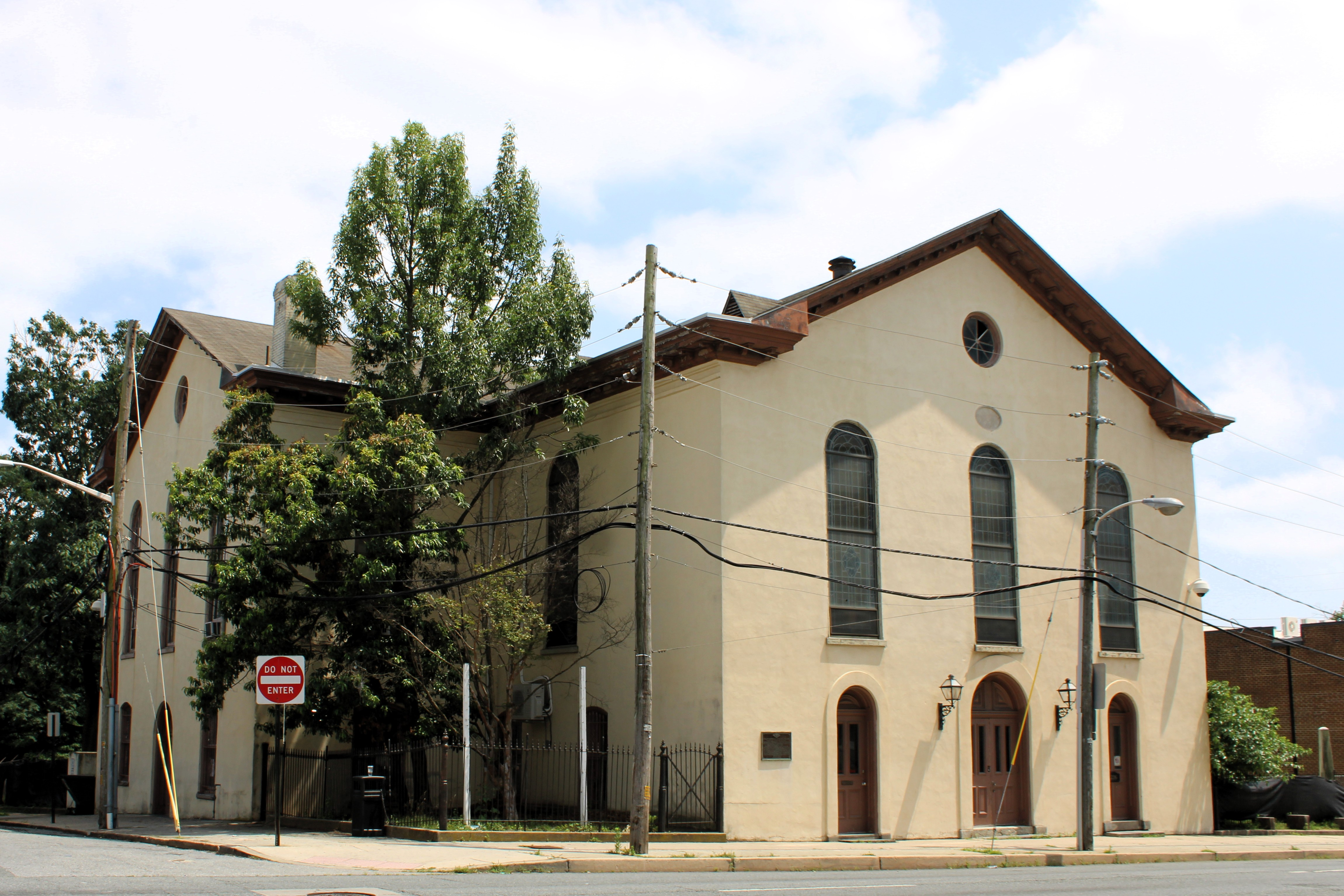
- Old Asbury Methodist Church in 2025

- Location within Delaware Location within the United States
- Location: Walnut and 3rd Sts. Wilmington, Delaware
- Coordinates: 39.738425°N 75.548781°W
- Area: 0.5 acres (0.20 ha)
- Built: 1789
- Architectural style: Italianate, Italianate vernacular
- NRHP reference No.: 76000578
- Added to NRHP: November 07, 1976

Old Asbury Methodist Church is a historic Methodist church located at Walnut and 3rd Streets in Wilmington, New Castle County, Delaware. It was the first Methodist church in Wilmington. The church is a two-story, three-bay, L-shaped stuccoed stone structure in a vernacular Italianate style. The original section was built in 1789, and subsequently enlarged in 1820, 1825, 1838, and 1845. The chapel wing to the north was added in 1875.

It was added to the National Register of Historic Places in 1976.
