= Orrum, North Carolina =

- Town
- Location within the state of North Carolina
- Coordinates: 34°28′00″N 79°00′32″W
- Country: United States
- State: North Carolina
- County: Robeson
- Founded: 1832
- Incorporated: 1903
- Named after: Variant of Orton

Area
  - Total: 0.48 sq mi (1.24 km^{2})
  - Land: 0.48 sq mi (1.24 km^{2})
  - Water: 0 sq mi (0.00 km^{2})
- Elevation: 95 ft (29 m)

Population (2020)
  - Total: 59
  - Density: 123.4/sq mi (47.64/km^{2})
- Time zone: UTC-5 (Eastern (EST))
  - Summer (DST): UTC-4 (EDT)
- ZIP code: 28369
- Area codes: 910, 472
- FIPS code: 37-49460
- GNIS feature ID: 2407055

Orrum is a town in Robeson County, North Carolina, United States. The population was 59 at the 2020 census.

== History ==
The community that became Orrum was established around 1832 around Big Branch Church. It was incorporated in 1903. Residents originally wanted to name it Orton, but as the name was already in use in nearby Columbus County, the locals opted for "Orrum" as a similar name. The Williams-Powell House was listed on the National Register of Historic Places in 1984.

== Geography ==
According to the United States Census Bureau, the town has a total area of 0.6 square miles (1.6 km^{2}), all land.

== Demographics ==
Historical population
Census	Pop.	Note	%±
1910	214		—
1920	86		−59.8%
1930	209		143.0%
1940	173		−17.2%
1950	162		−6.4%
1960	139		−14.2%
1970	162		16.5%
1980	167		3.1%
1990	103		−38.3%
2000	79		−23.3%
2010	91		15.2%
2020	59		−35.2%
U.S. Decennial Census

As of the census of 2000, there were 79 people, 32 households, and 20 families residing in the town. The population density was 140.0 inhabitants per square mile (54.1/km^{2}). There were 36 housing units at an average density of 63.8 per square mile (24.6/km^{2}). The racial makeup of the town was 79.75% White, 15.19% African American, 2.53% Native American and 2.53% Pacific Islander.

There were 32 households, out of which 28.1% had children under the age of 18 living with them, 40.6% were married couples living together, 15.6% had a female householder with no husband present, and 34.4% were non-families. 31.3% of all households were made up of individuals, and 12.5% had someone living alone who was 65 years of age or older. The average household size was 2.28 and the average family size was 2.81.

In the town, the population was spread out, with 19.0% under the age of 18, 7.6% from 18 to 24, 26.6% from 25 to 44, 34.2% from 45 to 64, and 12.7% who were 65 years of age or older. The median age was 42 years. For every 100 females, there were 83.7 males. For every 100 females age 18 and over, there were 88.2 males.

The median income for a household in the town was $25,417, and the median income for a family was $35,000. Males had a median income of $27,917 versus $13,125 for females. The per capita income for the town was $12,095. There were 22.2% of families and 17.0% of the population living below the poverty line, including no under eighteens and 35.7% of those over 64.

== Works cited ==
- Powell, William S. (1976). The North Carolina Gazetteer: A Dictionary of Tar Heel Places. Chapel Hill: The University of North Carolina Press. ISBN 9780807812471.
