= Asbury United Methodist Church (Knoxville, Tennessee) =

Historic church in Tennessee, United States

- Asbury Methodist Episcopal Church, South
- U.S. National Register of Historic Places
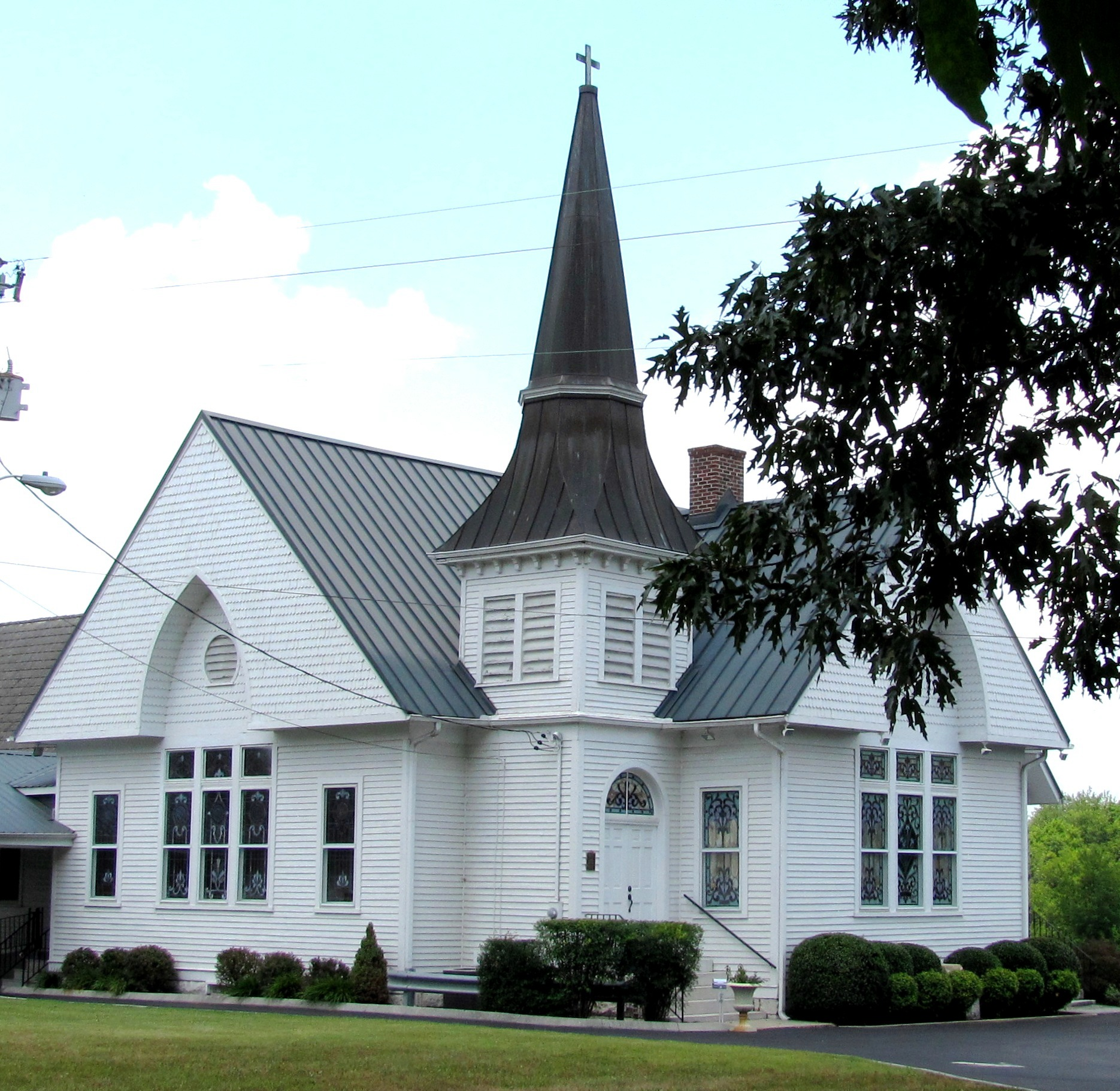

- Location within Tennessee Location within the United States
- Nearest city: 2822 Asbury Rd., Knoxville, Tennessee
- Coordinates: 35°57′13″N 83°49′33″W
- Area: 2 acres (0.81 ha)
- Built: 1898
- Architectural style: Late Gothic Revival
- MPS: Knoxville and Knox County MPS
- NRHP reference No.: 97000222
- Added to NRHP: March 18, 1997

Asbury United Methodist Church, formerly known as Asbury Methodist Episcopal Church, South, is a historic church in Knoxville, Tennessee.

== History ==
The church is named for English Methodist evangelist Francis Asbury, who is credited with disseminating Methodism in the United States in late 18th and early 19th centuries, and who on November 2, 1800, led the first Methodist worship service in East Tennessee.

The church sits on land that was donated in 1855 by the Huffaker family. The church building underwent its last major renovation in 1898. The Gothic revival architecture has been largely unaltered since that time. Subsequent additions include a backlighted painting of Jesus; an organ, piano, and chimes; a parsonage and Sunday school built in 1938; and a fellowship hall built in 1949.

The Methodist Church in America divided over the issue of slavery in 1845. For many years before the 1939 merger that formed the United Methodist Church, two separate Methodist groups held services in the Asbury church, with the Methodist Episcopal Church, South, meeting for worship in the morning on Sunday and the Methodist Episcopal Church meeting in the afternoon.

== National Register listing ==
The church building was listed on the National Register of Historic Places in 1997. The National Register nomination referred to the "inspirational feeling" imparted by the Gothic revival architecture, the "sense of power" imparted by the church's steep gabled roof and pronounced arches, and the "sense of strength and stability" conveyed by the square bell tower, which has a bellcast roof.
