= Asbury Methodist Church (Raynham, North Carolina) =

Historic church in North Carolina, United States

- U.S. National Register of Historic Places
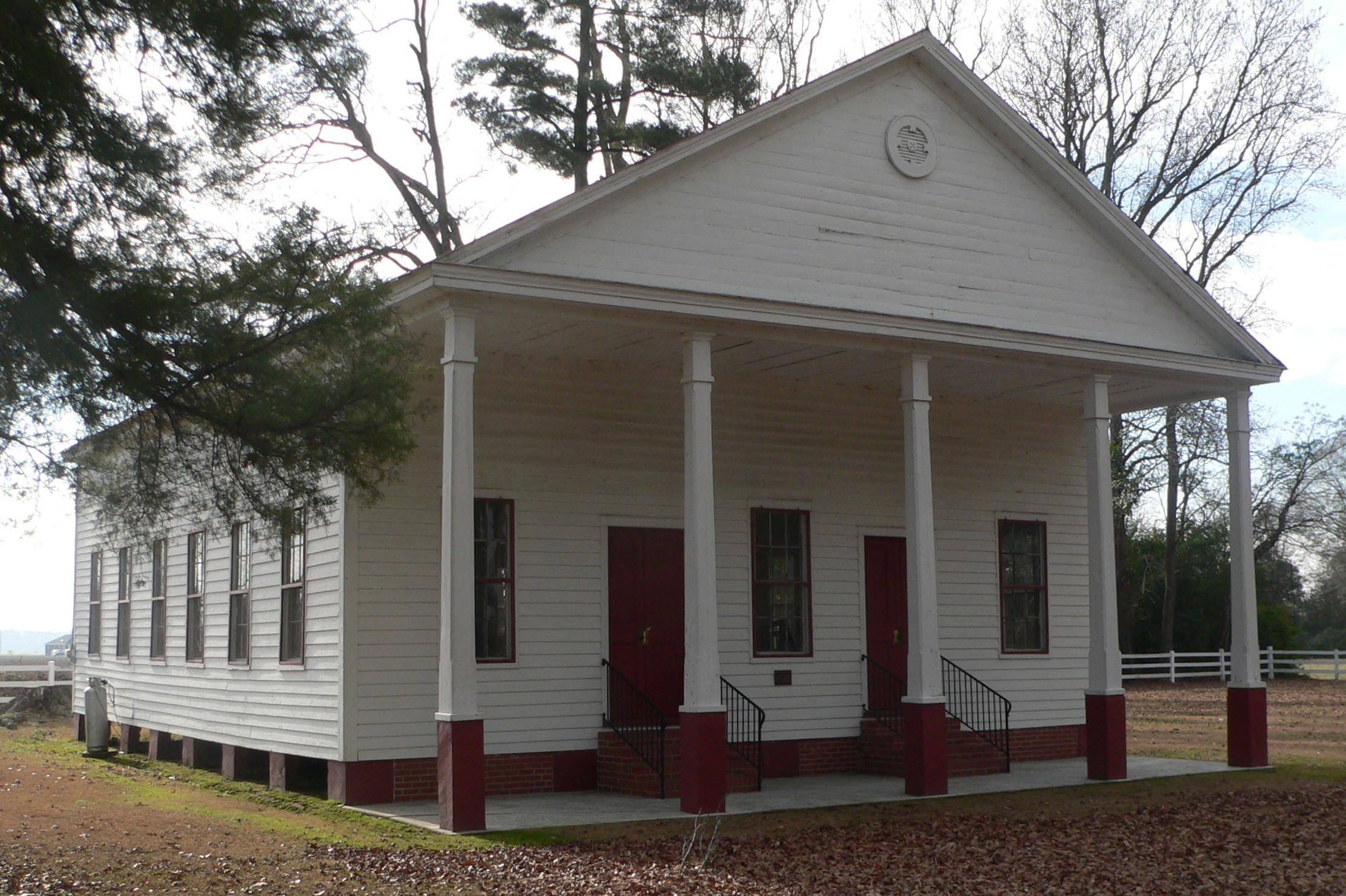
- Asbury Methodist Church, December 2014

- Location within North Carolina Location within the United States
- Location: SE. side US Hwy. 301 N., .10 mi. SW. of NC 1154, Raynham, North Carolina
- Coordinates: 34°34′30″N 79°11′34″W
- Area: 2.5 acres (1.0 ha)
- Built: 1861
- Built by: David Townsend
- Architectural style: Greek Revival
- NRHP reference No.: 09000264
- Added to NRHP: April 30, 2009

Asbury Methodist Church, also known as Asbury Memorial Church and Asbury Methodist Episcopal Church South, is a historic Methodist church located at Raynham, Robeson County, North Carolina. It was built in 1861, and is a one-story, timber-frame building in a modest Greek Revival style. It measures approximately 40 feet by 50 feet and features a prominent, projecting, pedimented front gable supported by five posts. Adjacent to the church is the contributing cemetery with approximately 200 marked graves. The oldest grave dates to 1848.

It was added to the National Register of Historic Places in 2009.
