= Lumberton, North Carolina =

City in North Carolina, United States

- City
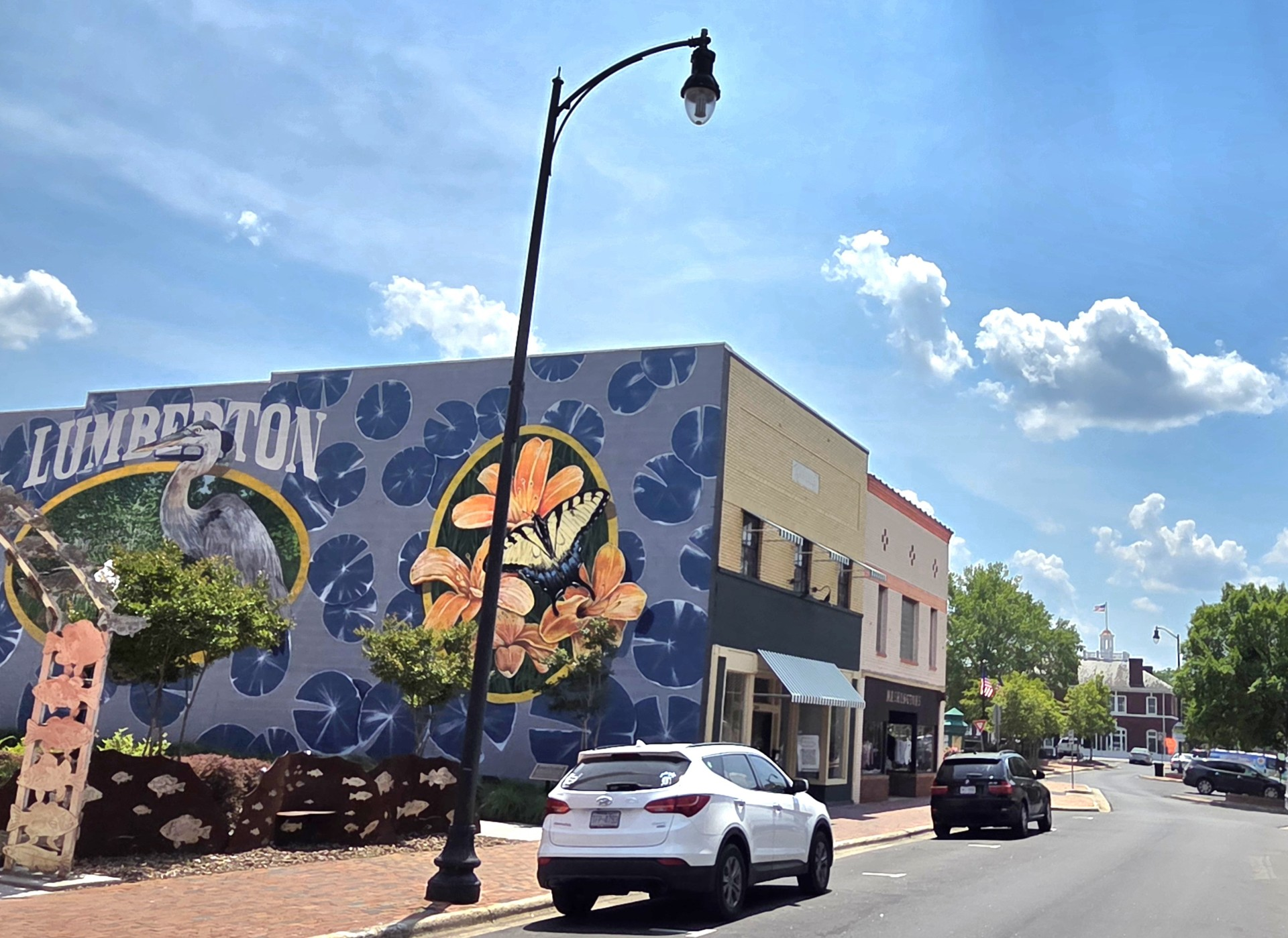
- North Elm Street mural and historic fire station

- Seal

- Location within the state of North Carolina Lumberton (the United States)
- Coordinates: 34°37′52″N 79°01′07″W
- Country: United States
- State: North Carolina
- County: Robeson
- Named for: Lumber River

Government

Area
  - Total: 17.84 sq mi (46.20 km^{2})
  - Land: 17.76 sq mi (46.00 km^{2})
  - Water: 0.077 sq mi (0.20 km^{2})
- Elevation: 135 ft (41 m)

Population (2020)
  - Total: 19,025
  - Density: 1,071.3/sq mi (413.62/km^{2})
- Time zone: UTC−5 (Eastern (EST))
  - Summer (DST): UTC−4 (EDT)
- ZIP codes: 28358-28360
- Area codes: 910, 472
- FIPS code: 37-39700
- GNIS feature ID: 2404974
- Website: www.ci.lumberton.nc.us

Lumberton is a city in and the county seat of Robeson County, North Carolina, United States. As of 2020, its population was 19,025.

Located in southern North Carolina's Inner Banks region, Lumberton is located on the Lumber River. It was founded in 1787 by John Willis, an officer in the American Revolution. This was developed as a shipping point for lumber used by the Navy, and logs were guided downriver to Georgetown, South Carolina. Most of the town's growth took place after World War II.

David Lynch's 1986 film Blue Velvet was set in Lumberton; however filming took place in Wilmington.

== History ==
Robeson County, North Carolina, was formed in 1787. General John Willis, owner of the Red Banks plantation, lobbied to have the county's new seat of government located on his land. The site of Lumberton was chosen due to its central location in the county, proximity to a reliable ford of the Lumber River, and as it was where several roads intersected. Willis turned over 170 acres, which were surveyed and disbursed in a lottery held under the auspices of the county court on August 14, 1787. As the site was heavily forested, trees were felled to make way for a courthouse, business and residential lots, streets, a commons, and a public square. The first courthouse was a wooden residence sold by Willis to the county and moved into place after the land was clear. Lumberton was formally created by an act of the North Carolina General Assembly on November 3, 1788, which granted the town a charter and the power to levy taxes. The community was named in homage to the Lumber River.

Aside from the courthouse, the first buildings in Lumberton were a handful of brick structures built near the river, which included a hotel, stores, and warehouses, which were stocked by goods sent up the river from Georgetown, South Carolina. The community's first school was established by Willis in 1791. The town had a post office by 1796. It was formally incorporated in 1852 and granted a municipal government with a mayor and a board of commissioners. The town was connected by rail with Wilmington in 1860, which reduced its reliance on river trade from Georgetown. Much of the business district was burnt down in a fire in 1870 and another in 1876.

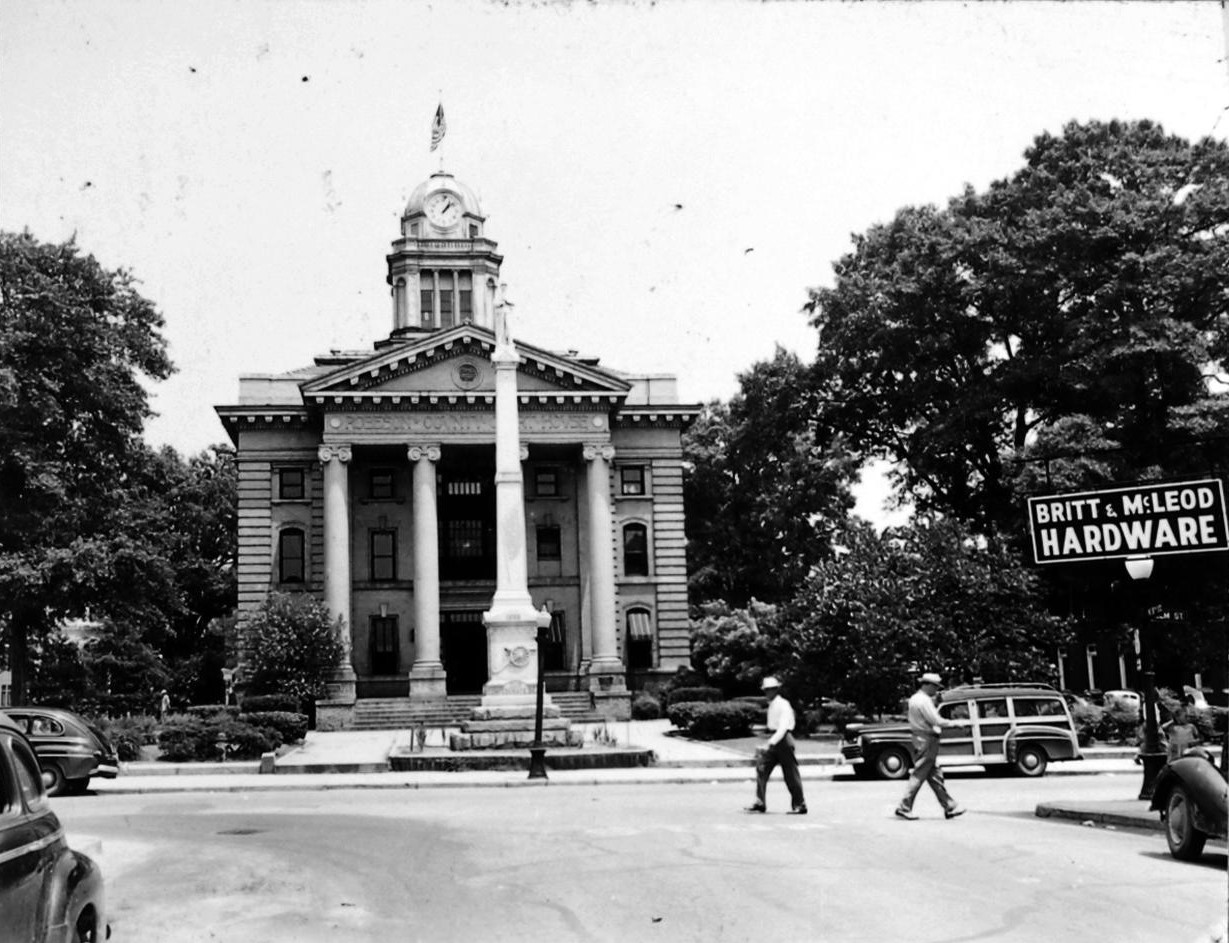
Robeson County Courthouse in Lumberton, 1948

For four seasons, 1947–50, Lumberton fielded a professional minor-league baseball team in the Tobacco State League. Affiliated with the Chicago Cubs, the team was known as the Lumberton Cubs in 1947 and '48, and the Lumberton Auctioneers in 1949 and '50.

In 1970, Lumberton was named an All-America City, presented by the National Civic League. Many businesses left the downtown in the mid-1970s. A 1988 hostage crisis at the offices of The Robesonian and the 1993 murder of James R. Jordan Sr. nearby generated a negative national image for the city. In 1995, the city won the All-America City award a second time.

In 2016, Robeson County was impacted by Hurricane Matthew, leading to record flooding in Lumberton. In 2018, the county was struck by Hurricane Florence, which broke the flooding record. As a result of extensive damage to homes, entire streets in south and west Lumberton were left abandoned.

The Baker Sanatorium, Luther Henry Caldwell House, Carolina Theatre, Humphrey-Williams Plantation, Lumberton Commercial Historic District, Planters Building, Robeson County Agricultural Building, Alfred Rowland House, and US Post Office-Lumberton are listed on the National Register of Historic Places.

== Geography ==
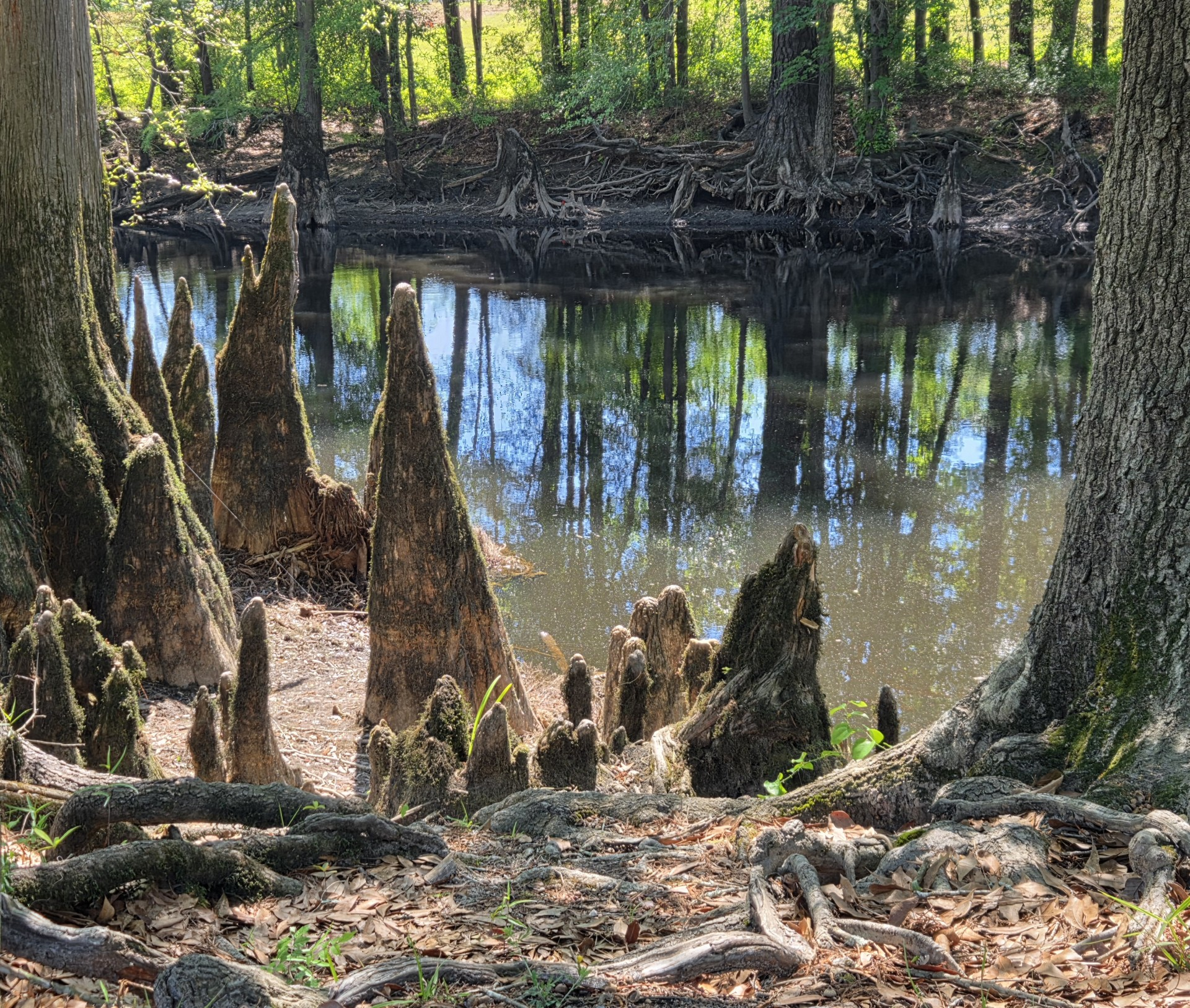
Lumber River, flanked by baldcypress trees, from the James L. Stephens Memorial Park

Lumberton is located in the Coastal Plains region. The Lumber River, a blackwater river, flows through downtown and can be accessed from the Downtown Riverwalk, the Luther Britt Park, or the James L. Stephens Memorial Park. The Lumber River State Park incorporates 115 miles (185 km) of natural and scenic waterway, including through Lumberton.

According to the United States Census Bureau, the city has a total area of 15.8 square miles (40.9 km^{2}), of which 0.1 sq mi (0.2 km^{2}) (0.44%) is covered by water.

Lumberton is served by Interstate 95 and Interstate 74.

Lumberton lies within the Carolina Border Belt, a regional network of tobacco markets and warehouses along both sides of the North Carolina-South Carolina border.

=== Climate ===
Lumberton experiences a humid subtropical climate (Köppen: Cfa) with hot, humid summers and cool winters.

Climate data for Lumberton, North Carolina (1991-2020 normals, extremes 1903-present)
Month	Jan	Feb	Mar	Apr	May	Jun	Jul	Aug	Sep	Oct	Nov	Dec	Year
Record high °F (°C)	82 (28)	84 (29)	96 (36)	96 (36)	101 (38)	104 (40)	108 (42)	106 (41)	104 (40)	99 (37)	87 (31)	83 (28)	108 (42)
Mean maximum °F (°C)	74.0 (23.3)	77.0 (25.0)	82.1 (27.8)	86.9 (30.5)	93.2 (34.0)	97.7 (36.5)	98.0 (36.7)	96.8 (36.0)	93.0 (33.9)	87.9 (31.1)	80.7 (27.1)	75.0 (23.9)	99.7 (37.6)
Mean daily maximum °F (°C)	54.4 (12.4)	57.7 (14.3)	65.3 (18.5)	74.3 (23.5)	81.3 (27.4)	87.7 (30.9)	90.8 (32.7)	88.8 (31.6)	83.8 (28.8)	74.9 (23.8)	65.3 (18.5)	57.4 (14.1)	73.5 (23.0)
Daily mean °F (°C)	43.8 (6.6)	46.4 (8.0)	53.1 (11.7)	61.7 (16.5)	69.9 (21.1)	77.6 (25.3)	81.0 (27.2)	79.3 (26.3)	73.9 (23.3)	63.3 (17.4)	53.3 (11.8)	46.6 (8.1)	62.5 (16.9)
Mean daily minimum °F (°C)	33.2 (0.7)	35.1 (1.7)	40.9 (4.9)	49.1 (9.5)	58.6 (14.8)	67.5 (19.7)	71.3 (21.8)	69.7 (20.9)	64 (18)	51.8 (11.0)	41.3 (5.2)	35.8 (2.1)	51.5 (10.9)
Mean minimum °F (°C)	17.3 (−8.2)	21.9 (−5.6)	25.6 (−3.6)	32.8 (0.4)	44.2 (6.8)	56.3 (13.5)	63.4 (17.4)	61.1 (16.2)	51.8 (11.0)	35.3 (1.8)	25.6 (−3.6)	22.0 (−5.6)	15.5 (−9.2)
Record low °F (°C)	−1 (−18)	−1 (−18)	9 (−13)	22 (−6)	29 (−2)	40 (4)	50 (10)	44 (7)	35 (2)	20 (−7)	12 (−11)	−2 (−19)	−2 (−19)
Average precipitation inches (mm)	3.70 (94)	3.41 (87)	3.61 (92)	3.43 (87)	4.26 (108)	5.23 (133)	5.60 (142)	6.16 (156)	5.18 (132)	3.39 (86)	3.24 (82)	3.62 (92)	50.83 (1,291)
Average precipitation days (≥ 0.01 in)	11.1	9.8	9.9	8.9	9.8	11.3	11.3	11.7	9.3	8.1	8.3	11.1	120.6
Source: NOAA

== Demographics ==
Historical population
Census	Pop.	Note	%±
1870	615		—
1880	533		−13.3%
1890	584		9.6%
1900	849		45.4%
1910	2,230		162.7%
1920	2,691		20.7%
1930	4,140		53.8%
1940	5,803		40.2%
1950	9,186		58.3%
1960	15,305		66.6%
1970	16,961		10.8%
1980	18,241		7.5%
1990	18,601		2.0%
2000	20,795		11.8%
2010	21,542		3.6%
2020	19,025		−11.7%
2025 (est.)	18,955	▼	−0.4%
U.S. Decennial Census

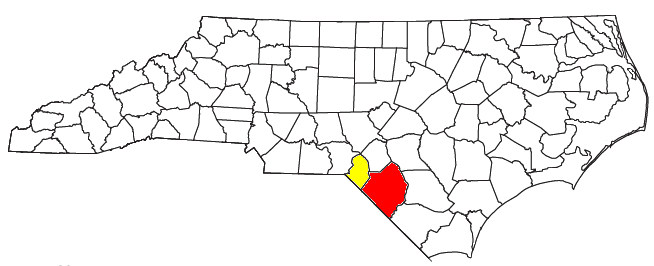
Location of the Lumberton-Laurinburg CSA and its components: Lumberton Micropolitan Statistical Area Laurinburg Micropolitan Statistical Area

Lumberton is the larger principal city of the Fayetteville-Lumberton-Pinehurst, NC Combined Statistical Area that includes the Lumberton (Robeson County) and Laurinburg (Scotland County) micropolitan areas. The CSA had a combined population of 520,378 at the 2020 census.

=== 2020 census ===
As of the 2020 census, 19,025 people resided in the city. The median age was 38.8 years; 23.9% of residents were under the age of 18 and 18.7% were 65 years of age or older. For every 100 females there were 95.1 males, and for every 100 females age 18 and over there were 91.3 males age 18 and over.

There were 7,266 households, of which 32.8% had children under the age of 18 living in them. Of all households, 31.8% were married-couple households, 20.0% were households with a male householder and no spouse or partner present, and 42.7% were households with a female householder and no spouse or partner present. About 33.9% of all households were made up of individuals and 14.2% had someone living alone who was 65 years of age or older. There were 4,536 families in the city.

There were 8,531 housing units, of which 14.8% were vacant. The homeowner vacancy rate was 3.3% and the rental vacancy rate was 6.6%.

93.0% of residents lived in urban areas, while 7.0% lived in rural areas.

Racial composition as of the 2020 census
Race	Number	Percent
White	6,759	35.5%
Black or African American	6,797	35.7%
American Indian and Alaska Native	2,884	15.2%
Asian	380	2.0%
Native Hawaiian and Other Pacific Islander	26	0.1%
Some other race	1,217	6.4%
Two or more races	962	5.1%
Hispanic or Latino (of any race)	1,888	9.9%

=== 2010 census ===
As of the 2010 United States census, 21,542 people were living in the city. The racial makeup of the city was 39.0% White, 36.7% Black, 12.7% Native American, 2.4% Asian, 0.1% Pacific Islander, 0.1% from some other race, and 2.2% from two or more races. About 6.7% were Hispanic or Latino of any race.

=== 2000 census ===
As of the census of 2000, 20,795 people, 7,827 households and 5,165 families were residing in Lumberton. The population density was 1,322.4 inhabitants per square mile (510.6/km^{2}). The 8,800 housing units had an average density of 559.6 per square mile (216.1/km^{2}). The racial makeup of the city was 48.54% White, 35.44% African American, 12.79% Native American, 0.91% Asian, 1.21% from other races, and 1.11% from two or more races. Hispanics or Latinos of any race were 3.30% of the population.

Of the 7,827 households, 32.2% had children under 18 living with them; 38.8% were married couples living together; 23.0% had a female householder with no husband present, and 34.0% were not families. About 29.9% of all households were made up of individuals, and 12.6% had someone living alone who was 65 or older. The average household size was 2.44, and the average family size was 3.01. Children of high-school age (grades 9–12) attend Lumberton High School, which is run by the Public Schools of Robeson County, as it is in Robeson County.

The city's age distribution was 26.3% under 18; 9.3% from 18 to 24; 28.2% from 25 to 44; 21.3% from 45 to 64; and 14.8% who were 65 or older. The median age was 35 years. For every 100 females, there were 89.1 males. For every 100 females 18 and over, there were 85.8 males.

The median income for a household in Lumberton was $26,782, and for a family was $33,839. Males had a median income of $28,903 versus $24,503 for females. The per capita income for the city was $15,504. About 23.9% of families and 25.9% of the population were below the poverty line, including 38.4% of those under age 18 and 23.7% of those age 65 or over.

== Government ==
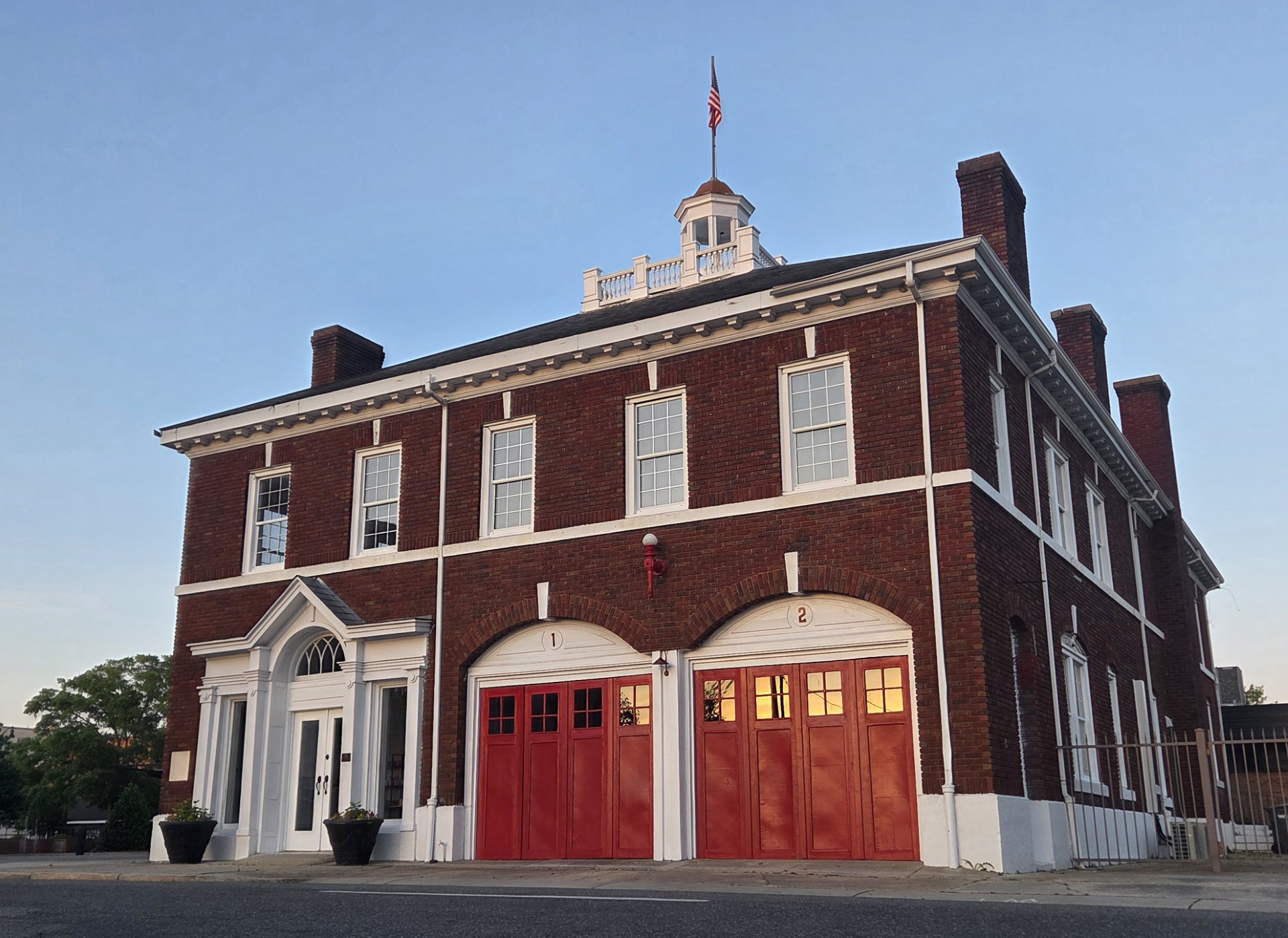
Former Lumberton Municipal Building (Old City Hall and Fire Station), built in 1917

Lumberton is headed by a council–manager government. The city supplies electric utility services to its residents.

== Education ==
Public Schools of Robeson County, the only school district in the county, operates public schools.

== Notable people ==
- Brad Allen, NFL referee
- Velma Barfield (1932–1984), serial killer who murdered six people
- Peggi Blu (1945–2024), entertainer and 1986 Female Vocalist Grand Champion, Star Search
- Benjamin Crump (born 1969), civil-rights attorney
- Brad Edwards (born 1966) former NFL defensive back and director of athletics at George Mason University
- Hunter Foster (born 1969), Tony Award-nominated actor
- Penny Fuller (born 1940), film, television, and Broadway actress, moved to Lumberton at age 12
- Tommy Greene (born 1967), Major League Baseball pitcher
- Carmen Hart (born 1984), pornographic film actress and erotic dancer
- Johnny Hunt (born 1952), elected president of Southern Baptist Convention in 2008
- Dennis F. Kinlaw (1922–2017), academic, president of Asbury University; author of Christian theological works
- Vonta Leach (born 1981), fullback for NFL's Baltimore Ravens
- Ashton Locklear (born 1998), gymnast
- Gene Locklear (born 1949), Major League Baseball outfielder
- Sean Locklear (born 1981), football offensive tackle
- Dwight Lowry (1957–1997), Major League Baseball player for Detroit Tigers and Minnesota Twins
- Mike McIntyre (born 1956), U.S. Representative of North Carolina's 7th Congressional District from 1997 to 2015
- Angus Wilton McLean (1870–1935), 56th governor of North Carolina from 1925 to 1929
- Margaret French McLean (1879–1959), First Lady of North Carolina from 1925 to 1929
- Victoria "Porkchop" Parker (born 1970), drag queen best known for appearing on the first season of RuPaul's Drag Race
- M. Warley Platzek (1854–1932), lawyer and New York Supreme Court Justice
- Afeni Shakur (1947–2016), prominent member of Black Panther Party and mother of rapper Tupac Shakur
- John Small (1946–2012), linebacker with NFL's Atlanta Falcons and Detroit Lions
- Ida Van Smith (1917–2003), pilot and flight instructor
- Jamain Stephens (born 1974), NFL offensive tackle for Pittsburgh Steelers and Cincinnati Bengals
- Donnell Thompson (born 1958), NFL defensive end
- Benjamin Forrest Williams (1925–2017), artist and art curator
- Betty Rose Wishart (born 1947), composer
- Tim Worley (born 1966), former running back for the Georgia Bulldogs and NFL's Pittsburgh Steelers and Chicago Bears

== Works cited ==
- Marson, Stephen M.; Legerton, Mac (2021). "Disaster diaspora and the consequences of economic displacement and climate disruption, including Hurricanes Matthew (October 8, 2016) and Florence (September 14, 2018) in Robeson County, North Carolina". Natural Hazards. 107 (3): 2247–2262. Bibcode:2021NatHa.107.2247M. doi:10.1007/s11069-021-04529-8. S2CID 231671525.
