= CTY (disambiguation) =

The three-letter abbreviation CTY may refer to:

- Console teleTYpe
- CTY is the ICAO airline designator for Cryderman Air Service, United States
- Center for Talented Youth
- Centre for the Talented Youth of Ireland
- county
- a century
- .cty
- Cross City Airport
