= Amy Shelton =

U.S. cognitive psychology researcher and academic administrator

- Born: Amy Lynne Shelton
- Education: Illinois State University; Vanderbilt University
- Scientific career
- Fields: Cognitive psychology
- Workplaces: Johns Hopkins University
- Doctoral advisor: Timothy P. McNamara

Amy Lynne Shelton is a U.S. cognitive psychology professor and academic administrator serving as the director of the Center for Talented Youth since 2022. She is a professor at the Johns Hopkins School of Education.

== Life ==
Shelton earned a B.S. in psychology from the Illinois State University. She completed a master's degree (1996) and Ph.D. (1999) in cognitive psychology at Vanderbilt University. Her dissertation was titled, The Role of Egocentric Orientation in Human Spatial Memory. Timothy P. McNamara was Shelton's doctoral advisor.

From 2002 to 2013, Shelton worked in the department of psychological and brain sciences at the Johns Hopkins School of Education. Her research focuses on spatial cognition, learning and memory, spatial skill development, and neurodevelopmental disorders. She then took a joint position in the school of education and the Center for Talented Youth (CTY) as its director of research. From January 2019 to July 2020, she was the interim CTY director, succeeding Elaine Tuttle Hansen. In 2022, she became director of CTY. She is also a professor and a former associate dean for research in the school of education. Shelton holds joint appointments in the Johns Hopkins School of Medicine and the Zanvyl Krieger School of Arts and Sciences. She is on the editorial board of Spatial Cognition and Computation and is a past editor of the Journal of Experimental Psychology.
