= Study of Mathematically Precocious Youth =

Longitudinal survey study of persons with stellar SAT scores

The Study of Mathematically Precocious Youth (SMPY) is a prospective longitudinal survey study of persons (mostly in the United States) identified by scores of 700 or higher on a section of the SAT Reasoning Test before age 13. It is one of the longest-running longitudinal studies of gifted youth. Study scholars have used its data to assess hypotheses about talent development and occupational preferences.

== History ==
SMPY was founded by Julian Stanley in 1971 at Johns Hopkins University, with funding from the Spencer Foundation. In 1986, the study headquarters moved to Iowa State University, where Camilla Benbow led the study until 1990. Since that year, the study has been led by Benbow and David Lubinski. In 1998, the study headquarters moved to Vanderbilt University.

== Study ascertainment ==
SMPY is the longest-running longitudinal study of gifted children in the United States. Subjects are identified by high scores on the SAT Reasoning Test, which they take at or before the age of 13 years. Eligibility is contingent on scoring at least 700 out of a possible 800 standard score points on the test (with prorated eligibility for higher scores up to age 13 years and 10 months).

Participation in SMPY is voluntary for students who attain eligible scores. After the first year, Stanley decided to include students with exceptional scores in either the mathematics or verbal test sections, for inclusion in what is called the Study of Exceptional Talent, the name SMPY was retained for the follow-up surveys. Follow-up surveys were sent to study participants after five, ten, twenty, and thirty-five years. Benbow and Lubinski and their colleagues used the data to explore individual differences among intellectually able individuals. The study population is divided into several subgroups.

== Findings ==
The survey responses suggest that the gifted have different educational needs and accomplish more in school and work than moderately gifted. Talented students have differing abilities, interests, and lifestyle preferences, although they typically express similar levels of intellectual satisfaction and achieve advanced educational credentials at similar rates. Sex differences other investigators have found on the things-people dimension in normative populations appear in education and work among the study population.

SMPY found that talented individuals tend to pursue careers that draw upon their cognitive strengths. Highly able youth with notably stronger mathematical than verbal ability often study and work in science and engineering, whereas adolescents with better verbal scores frequently went into the humanities, arts, social science, or law. Individuals with comparable mathematical and verbal ability did not follow such clear-cut trajectories, although many males with the "high-flat" ability profile pursued educational and vocational pursuits in science.

== See also ==
- Center for Talented Youth (CTY)
- Study of Exceptional Talent (SET)
- Talent Identification Program (TIP)

== Bibliography ==
- Bock, Gregory; Ackrill, Kate, eds. (1993). The Origins and Development of High Ability (PDF). Ciba Foundation Symposium 178. Chichester: Wiley. p. 119. ISBN 978-0-470-51450-4. See JSTOR 3036309 for review.
- Heller, Kurt A.; Mönks, Franz J.; Sternberg, Robert J.; Subotnik, Rena F., eds. (2000). International Handbook of Giftedness and Talent (2nd ed.). Amsterdam: Pergamon. p. 318. ISBN 978-0-08-043796-5.
- Hunt, Earl (2011). Human Intelligence. Cambridge: Cambridge University Press. p. 346. ISBN 978-0-521-70781-7., chapter 10: "What Use is Intelligence?"
