= Study of Exceptional Talent =

Program for gifted students

The Julian C. Stanley Study of Exceptional Talent (SET) is an outgrowth of the Study of Mathematically Precocious Youth (SMPY) at Johns Hopkins University. Founded in 1971 by Professor Julian Stanley, SMPY pioneered the concept of above-grade-level testing of middle school students by using the SAT to identify exceptionally talented mathematical reasoners, then offering rigorous academic programs for students who exhibit exceptional reasoning ability.

== History ==
In 1979, the Center for Talented Youth (CTY) was created as an independent entity to administer the Johns Hopkins Talent Search and summer programs, while Dr. Stanley continued to focus on offering educational counseling to the ablest mathematical reasoners throughout the United States. SET was created in 1991, with a commitment to serve verbally as well as mathematically talented students.

== Eligibility ==
Students qualify for SET by scoring at least 700 on either the Math or Verbal (Critical Reading) SAT Reasoning Test before age 13 years. Students who take the SAT after their 13th birthday may qualify for SET by scoring an additional 10 points above 700 for each month or fraction of a month of age after their 13th birthday. Thus, a student who takes the SAT Reasoning Test two months and two weeks after their 13th birthday would qualify for SET with a score of at least 730 on either the SAT-Math or SAT-Verbal.

== See also ==
- Dr. Julian C. Stanley
- Terence Tao, alumnus
