= Upsilon Pi Epsilon =

International honor society for computing and Information

- ΥΠΕ
- Founded: January 10, 1967; 59 years ago Texas A&M University
- Type: Honor
- Affiliation: ACHS
- Status: Active
- Emphasis: Computing and Information Disciplines
- Scope: International
- Colors: Maroon and White
- Symbol: Abacus
- Publication: UPE NewsBrief
- Chapters: 270+
- Members: 229,800+ lifetime
- Nickname: UPE
- Headquarters: 158 Wetlands Edge Road; American Canyon, California 94503; United States
- Website: upe.acm.org

Upsilon Pi Epsilon (ΥΠΕ) is the first honor society dedicated to the computing and information disciplines. Informally known as UPE, Upsilon Pi Epsilon was founded in 1967, at Texas A&M University. It has more than 300 chapters worldwide.

== About ==
Upsilon Pi Epsilon was established at Texas A&M University in January 1967 as an honor society for computer information. It was founded with 22 original members. Dr. Dan Drew, head of the university's Department of Computer Science, was the society's advisor and, later, its national president.

The purpose of Upsilon Pi Epsilon was "the promotion of high scholarship and original investigation in the field of computer science and the advancement of the art and profession of computer science and related endeavors." It also recognized talent and sought to maintain high standards in the field. It was the first society developed for computer science in the United States.

A second chapter, Alpha of Pennsylvania, was formed at Pennsylvania State University in December 1969. The group expanded to other colleges in the United States and abroad, becoming the first international honor society for the computer and information disciplines.

Upsilon Pi Epsilon became a member of the Association of College Honor Societies in 1997. Upsilon Pi Epsilon is endorsed by the Association for Computing Machinery and the Institute of Electrical and Electronics Engineers Computer Society (IEEE-CS). It was also a founding member of the International Federation of Engineering Education Societies.

In 2012, Upsilon Pi Epsilon had 247 active collegiate chapters and 235 active alumni chapters. That same year, its annual initiations totaled 2,138 and its total membership was 229,800.

== Symbols ==
The Greek name Upsilon Pi Epsilon was selected for the first letters of the Greek words for computer, information, and science.

The UPE emblem or key features three symbols that are important historically to the computing and information disciplines: the zero, the one, and the abacus. The numbers are arranged as eleven binary bits. During the society's initiation ceremony, inductees sit in front of a table that features nine lit candles and two unlit candles that are arranged as the eleven binary bits of its key.

The colors of Upsilon Pi Epsilon are maroon and white. Its symbol is the abacus. Its quarterly publication is the UPE NewsBrief.

== Activities ==
Upsilon Pi Epsilon holds an annual convention. The society gives out several scholarships for its members and those who are active student members. It also cosponsors the International Collegiate Programming Contest with the Association of Computing Machinery.

== Membership ==
Membership is available to undergraduate and graduate students in computer science who have a high grade point average. Eligible undergraduates must complete 48 credits, rank in the upper third of their class, and have a 3.25 GPA overall. Graduate students must have completed 15 units of graduate coursework in computing and must be in the top third of their class. Alumni who majored in computer science can also be offered membership into the fraternity, along with faculty members. Faculty must have taught in field for one year. Membership in UPE is lifetime.

== Chapters ==
Upsilon Pi Epsilon has more than 300 chapters in the United States and overseas.

== Notable members ==
- Thomas G. Dietterich, emeritus professor of computer science at Oregon State University and a pioneer of the field of machine learning
- Devin Gaines, student at the University of Connecticut who earned five bachelor's degrees simultaneously
- Timothy P. McNamara, psychologist and the Gertrude Conaway Vanderbilt Chair in social and natural sciences at Vanderbilt University
- Joseph Monroe, computer scientist and academic
- Andrea Grimes Parker, computer scientist and professor at Georgia Tech
- Bryan Simonaire, Maryland state senator
- Angela Y. Wu, computer scientist and a professor emerita at American University

== See also ==
- Honor cords
