= Garry Jenkins =

American attorney, legal scholar, and academic administrator

Garry W. Jenkins

9th President of Bates College
- Incumbent
- Assumed office July 1, 2023
- Preceded by: A. Clayton Spencer

Personal details
- Spouse: Jon Lee
- Education: Haverford College (BA); Harvard Kennedy School (MPP); Harvard Law School (JD)

Garry William Jenkins is an American attorney, educator, and higher education administrator. He is the ninth president of Bates College, and the first Black person and first openly gay person to lead the institution.

== Early life and education ==
Garry W. Jenkins was born in Newark, New Jersey, to Leslie Jenkins, a high school teacher, and Garry C. Jenkins, a computer programmer. He grew up in South Orange, NJ with his parents and younger brother. He attended Delbarton School. In 1992, Jenkins graduated from Haverford College with a bachelor's degree with honors in political science. He then received a J.D. with honors from Harvard Law School and an M.P.P. from the Harvard Kennedy School in 1998.

== Career ==
=== Business and legal career ===
After graduating from Harvard, Jenkins clerked for Hon. Timothy K. Lewis of the United States Court of Appeals for the Third Circuit. He then worked as an attorney at Simpson Thacher & Bartlett before serving as chief operating officer and general counsel at the Goldman Sachs Foundation. Prior to graduate school, he began his professional career with Prudential Financial.

=== Academia ===
After two years at the Goldman Sachs Foundation, Jenkins joined the faculty at Ohio State University Moritz College of Law in 2004. At Ohio State, he was the associate dean for academic affairs and John C. Elam/Vorys Sater Professor of Law. He also co-founded and directed the Program on Law and Leadership at Moritz, one of the first such programs at a U.S. law school.

In 2016, Jenkins became the dean and William S. Pattee Professor of Law at the University of Minnesota Law School. As dean, Jenkins oversaw the largest fundraising campaign in the school's history and its endowment doubled. He also oversaw the rise in the school’s overall ranking (reaching a record high in U.S. News rankings), academic quality (highest sentering student credentials on record), and the diversity of the student body (also reaching record highs. Jenkins also resolved a major budget deficit restoring the law school to fiscal health, expanded experiential learning by creating new law clinics, improved student employment and bar passage outcomes, and increased resources for student mental health and wellbeing.

=== Honors and recognition ===
Jenkins has received several awards and honors for excellence in scholarship in corporate law, nonprofit law, and global justice. He was elected to the American Law Institute in 2019, and he is a fellow of the American Bar Association. For his academic administrative work, he earned a Diversity and Inclusion Award from the Minnesota Lawyer in 2022, and he was named to the Lawyers of Color “Power List” in 2020 and 2023. In 2023, he received an honorary degree of Doctor of Laws from Albany Law School. He also received the 2025 Maine Black Excellence Compass Career Award for his career success in higher education.

Jenkins has served on numerous nonprofit boards, including the National Women’s Law Center; Haverford College; Equal Justice Works; the Law School Admission Council; the Guthrie Theater in Minneapolis, among others. He was chair the deans’ steering committee of the Association of American Law Schools. By gubernatorial appointment, he served as one of Minnesota’s commissioners to the Uniform Law Commission.

=== Bates College presidency ===
In March 2023, Jenkins was announced as the ninth president of Bates College, succeeding Clayton Spencer who had been president since 2012. Jenkins became the first Black and openly gay person to lead the institution in its history. He assumed office on July 1, 2023. His inauguration was delayed by six months after the 2023 Lewiston shootings, where 18 people were killed.

== Personal life ==
Jenkins is married to Jon Lee, a law professor at the University of Oklahoma College of Law.
