= Elaine Tuttle Hansen =

American academic administrator, scholar and university professor

Executive Director of the Johns Hopkins Center for Talented Youth
- In office August 1, 2011 – August 1, 2018
- Succeeded by: Amy Shelton (interim)

7th President of Bates College
- In office November 8, 2002 – July 8, 2011
- Preceded by: Donald West Harward
- Succeeded by: Clayton Spencer

Provost of Haverford College
- In office August 1, 1995 – March 3, 2002

Personal details
- Education: Mount Holyoke College; University of Minnesota; University of Washington
- Profession: Academic administrator

Elaine Tuttle Hansen is an American academic administrator, scholar and university professor who served as the executive director of the Center for Talented Youth at Johns Hopkins University from 2011 to 2018 and the 7th President of Bates College from 2002 to 2011.

After serving as the Provost of Haverford College from 1995 to 2002, Hansen was installed as the seventh and first female president of Bates College in Lewiston, Maine. Her nine-year tenure as the college's president saw increased financial aid resources, faculty and student diversity, and modernization. Outside of her directorship she serves on the board of the Carnegie Foundation for the Advancement of Teaching and the Educational Records Bureau. She is a scholar of Middle English literature, contemporary women’s writing and feminist theory.

She is a member of the Modern Language Association and served as the president of the Society for Medieval Feminist Scholarship. Hansen's feminist research and commentary focuses on modern feminist theory, motherhood socialization, gender roles and gender equity. She has also commented and wrote on the topics of academic administration, professorial ethics, and admission standards in the United States.

== Early life and career ==
Hansen graduated Phi Beta Kappa from Mount Holyoke College in 1969. She received her M.A. from the University of Minnesota in 1972 and Ph.D. from the University of Washington in 1975. Hansen served as the Provost of Haverford College from 1995–2002 and was a Professor of English at Haverford from 1980-2002. During this time she also was an Assistant Professor of English at Hamilton College from 1978-1980.

=== Bates College ===
==== Presidency (2002–2011) ====
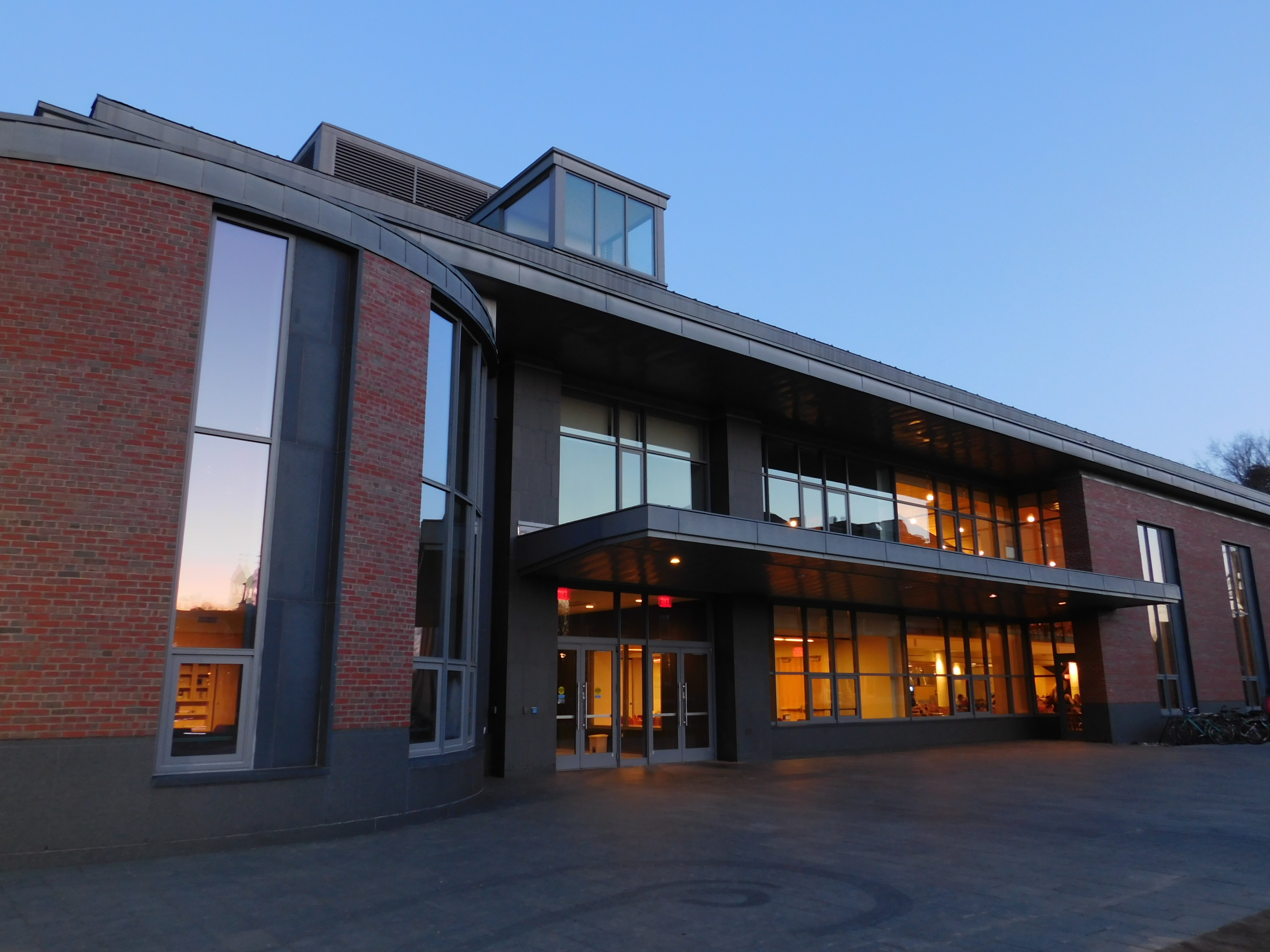
Bates College's 60,000 square feet dining complex, the Commons was built at a cost of $24 million under Hansen's tenure.

Hansen was installed as the seventh and first female president of Bates College on October 26, 2002 in Lewiston, Maine. Amid rising tensions between the Bates community and the city of Lewiston, Hansen released a message to the city outlining the college's impact in its development and historical significance. In a 2003 memo, she noted that the college's operating budget of $65 million, although originating outside of Maine, its expenditure was completely in-state. This accounted for nearly $6 million in direct payments to approximately 360 businesses in the Lewiston and Auburn area, and $1.2 million directly to individuals. She later mentioned that although the college was at the time a tax-exempt organization, she authorized $341,000 in fees for services and taxes to the city. Hansen cited the impact students and faculty have had on the economy of Lewiston ($70 million in direct spending by faculty, students, and visitors per year), as appropriate and meaningful integration into the community.

Hansen released an internal memo to the Bates community in late March 2003 regarding the U.S. invasion or Iraq, noting the campus protests and the resolution passed by the student government's representative assembly condemning the armed conflict. After Hurricane Katrina, Hansen waved tuition requirements for all student affected by its impact in late 2005. She later coordinated with the National Association of Independent Colleges and Universities (NAICU) to further financial aid allocation by the college for students in need. In 2005, Hansen taught a Short Term class on Chaucer at Bates.

Hansen began the Presidential Symposium program at the college during her first years as president. In 2007, she began the first such symposium entitled, "College for ‘Coming Time’" followed by a 2008 symposium entitled, "Unswerving Values, Changing Times". A new symposium has been held at the college ever since, eventually transforming into the Mount David Summit. In April 2007, Hansen sent an internal memo to the students of Bates regarding the shooting at Virginia Polytechnic Institute and State University, issuing new security protocols, and restating the current security measures in place at the college. In late 2007, Hansen announced the construction of 280 Hall, a new residence hall for 150 students at the foot of Mount David. In April 2008, expanded the campus of Bates College by completing the construction of "The Commons" at a cost of approximately $24 million.

During the 2008 financial crisis, Hansen released the meeting notes from the October 2008 Board of Trustees meeting. The notes were anticipated by the students as many feared for the economic stability of the college's endowment (i.e. financial aid). In the note, Hansen outlined the current economic climate as being in a period of "declining markets, higher costs of borrowing, the potential impact on giving (i.e. fundraising, endowment spending, etc). Hansen mentioned that the college would have to restructure its 10-year financial model in order accommodate its promise to cover "the demonstrated need of all admitted students." She later commented, "I recognize that these are times of stress and concern for all, but I want you to know that the Trustees and I have every confidence in the strength and perseverance of this institution and the entire Bates community."

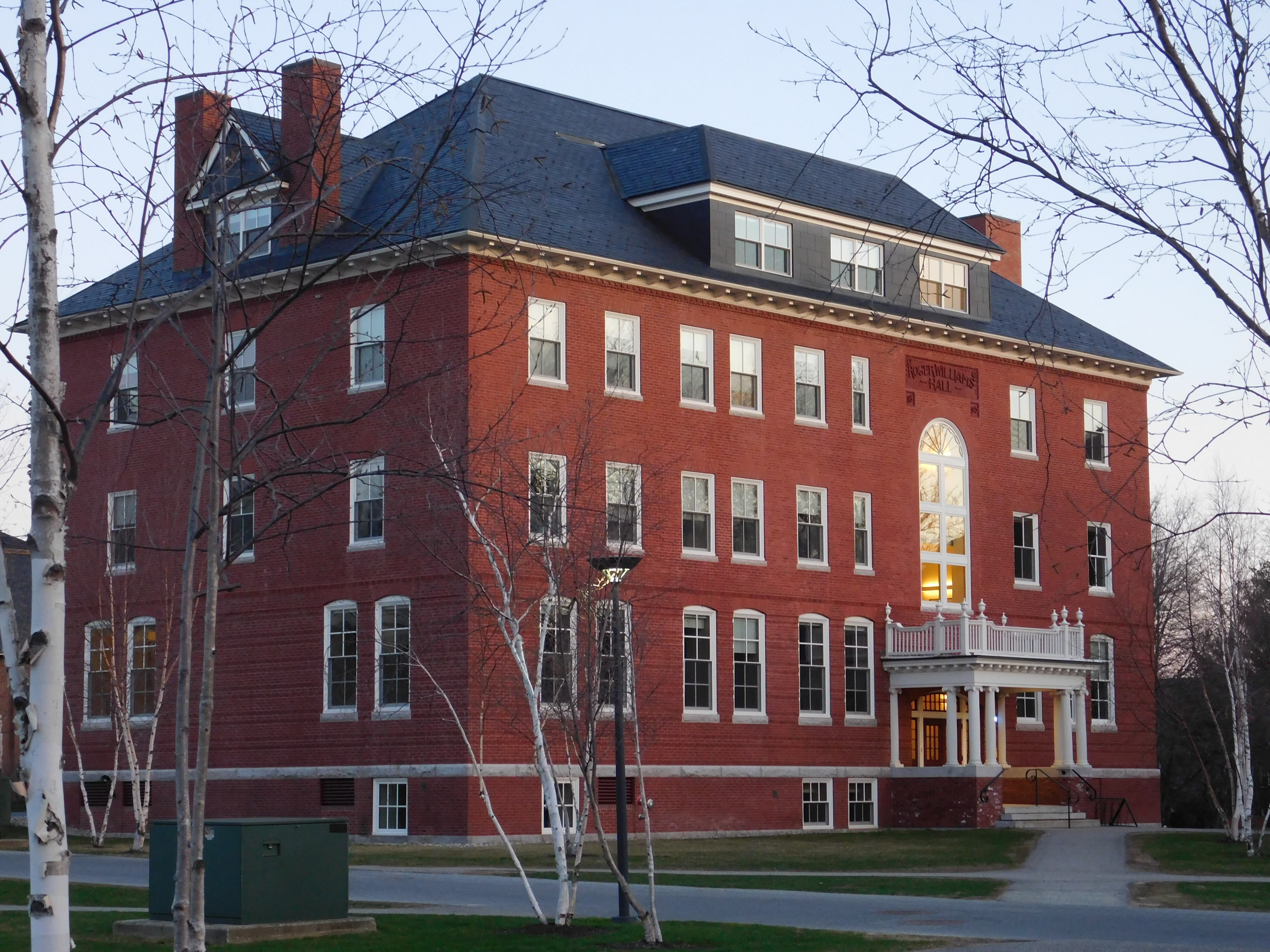
Roger Williams Hall was the last building to be renovated under the Hansen presidency.

On February 5, 2008, she alerted the Bates community about a letter sent to 136 U.S. colleges and universities by the chairman and ranking member of the U.S. Senate Finance Committee, Max Baucus and Charles Grassley. The letter proposed mandatory endowment payments and tuition caps for institutions of higher learning that held at or above $500 million in financial endowments. Although Bates, at the time held only $275 million, many students began to refinance loan packages prompting a memo to be issued by Hansen. She noted that although increased financial regulation is surely in the future for Bates, the college will not dismiss loans from its financial aid packages.

Hansen released a memo outlining fiscal year losses due to the 2008 financial crisis, noting a 31% market value loss. She lowered faculty increases but kept them positive during 2009-10. She announced that there will be no salary or hiring freezes, no layoffs, and that the college "would cover 100% of the increase in health care premiums for families." In 2010, Hansen earned $432,000 in salary, benefits and perks.

At the start of February 2011, Hansen renovated Roger Williams Hall and Hedge Hall as a part of "Campus Facilities Master Plan". She released a facilities report later on in the month outlining a "distributed campus plan" by extending the walkways into the city of Lewiston.

Hansen announced in the academic year 2011 that she would step down as Bates College president. It was announced soon after that the Vice President of Institutional Policy of Harvard University, Clayton Spencer was to be appointed as her successor.

=== Johns Hopkins University ===
==== CTY Directorship (2011–2018) ====
After stepping down from the Bates College presidency, Hansen joined the leadership of The Center for Talented Youth at Johns Hopkins University. On August 1, 2011, she was appointed as the executive director of the university program. On April 6, 2013, Hansen was the inauguration speaker for the incoming president of Berea College, Lyle Roelofs in Berea, Kentucky.

In July 2013, she was profiled by Johns Hopkins Gazette where she was asked about the upcoming decade for the program and its priorities. She defined her top priory for the future of The Center for Talented Youth at Johns Hopkins University by stating:

The evolving role of online learning and hybrid educational programs will serve the needs of the most academically advanced students particularly well. Our increased understanding of how the human brain functions will enhance our ability to identify and nurture the most exceptional minds and improve the educational experiences of all learners.

The university announced that she was stepping down in August 2018. She was succeeded by interim director Amy Shelton.

=== Outside of the directorship ===
Hansen serves on the board of the Carnegie Foundation for the Advancement of Teaching and the Educational Records Bureau. She also serves on the board of trustees at Franklin & Marshall College in Lancaster, Pennsylvania. She was an associate editor of the Middle English Dictionary at the University of Michigan. Hansen was also a past member and subsequent president of Society for Medieval Feminist Scholarship and a member of the Modern Language Association.

== Scholarship and commentary ==
=== Views on feminism ===
Hansen is a scholar of Middle English literature, contemporary women’s writing and feminist theory. Hansen identifies herself as a feminist who advances both gender equality and equity. Her stances on motherhood in society revolve around "conceptual splitting" or breaking up the concept into multiple areas, akin to inersectionality. She breaks up the notions of motherhood into multiple definitions such as full-time mothers, surrogate mothers, teenage mothers, adoptive mothers, mothers who live in poverty, and "mothers with briefcases." Hansen states:

Although it seems clear that new, unprecedented pressures have recently called into question the meaning of mother, this assumption nonetheless simplifies the history of the term. Motherhood has meant many different things in the past, just as it means (and will no doubt continue to mean) different things in different cultures and subcultures today.

=== Views on academia ===
As an established scholar and academic administrator in U.S. higher education, Hansen has published papers and expressed concern as well as acclaim for the operation of universities, academic standards, and accessibility. Hansen dismissed the theory of "grit prediction" put forward by Angela Lee Duckworth in an April 2013 TEDTalk. She dismissed the claim that "grit" or "a combination of passion and perseverance for a singularly important goal," was the ultimate predictor of academic success, ahead of a students intelligence quotient (I.Q.), family background, or socioeconomic status. Hansen asserted that if academics and professors burden themselves with "concerns about failing schools, common core standards and teaching to the test" and the new theory of "grit prediction", they will fail to pursue the true goal of education: providing a quality education for everyone. She has stated that although "teachers are being directed to educate students to struggle, take risks and persist against adversity," they fail to acknowledge those who excel, thus discounting their performance and contributions. Hansen stated that "in the rush to add grit to the lesson plan, we risk leaping from anecdote to antidote, and making assumptions about the correlation, or not, between effort and intelligence." She has made repeated calls for academics and professors to examine those who excel (i.e. those who are outliers) and integrate what they find to improve the aggregated academic experience in the classroom.

Being prepared for the rigorous of university work is another field Hansen comments on in interviews and articles. In an article for The Chronicle of Higher Education, entitled "Top Students, Too, Aren't Always Ready for College," Hansen defined in her words, "a serious college preparedness problem." She noted:

Our attitudes and practices send a loud and depressing message about how little we value academic achievement. From kindergarten through college, we must think harder about what we're saying when we focus on test scores, eliminate honors and AP classes, and cut what little financing exists for research on gifted students. Even as experts and pundits talk about the global achievement gap and the importance of creativity and innovation, few ask how we can raise the ceiling for the students already above the floor.

Her comments in the article were picked up by National Public Radio (NPR), where Michel Martin criticized her stance on a students road to a university. Martin pointed out that students have been trained from early on that independent achievement is to be valued above all else; to solve this issue is nearly impossible. Hansen clarified that her stance on the issue was opening up the conversation not providing an immediate and definitive answer to the problem. Hansen has commented on the relationship between the liberal arts and the U.S. business sector in letters to the editor, opinion editorials and articles. She has dismissed arguments brought forward by academics issuing that liberal arts colleges tend to disparage and undermine students who wish to participate in fields such as finance, business, and accounting. Author and 27th president of Dickinson College, William G. Durden charged liberal arts leaders with creating an elitist, “separatist” perspective. Hansen rejected this charge citing the "intellectual and ethical virtues fostered by their undergraduate experience" as a key to their success. She was quoted as saying:

Rather than faulting liberal education for failing to prevent greed and corruption in corporate America, we need to do a better job of communicating what the CEOs who prefer to hire liberal arts graduates already know: Although our expertise rests in academic disciplines and our worth to society has much to do with the intrinsic human need to learn, we have many “practical” programs, and access to the broad learning achieved through a liberal education gives our graduates a realistic understanding of the complexity of the world and prepares them for lives satisfying to themselves and useful to others.

Hansen has at times criticized collegiate admission practices stating that although restructuring the admissions platforms most universities use are generally agreed upon, how one is to do this is highly debatable. The shift from de-emphasizing individual performance and achievement, to general “authentically chosen” activities generating “emotional and ethical awareness and skills," is, according to Hansen, "doing more harm than good." She refuted a report issued by the Harvard School of Education which asserted that colleges and universities will have a better pool of students should they choose to admit students based on group activities, putting less value on individual contribution. Hansen asserts that implementing admission standards that focus on these metrics "invites only skepticism and confusion." She notes that admission officers can't reasonably deduce whether a student has an appropriate level of gratitude from a supplementary essay. To implement these subjective metrics would mean dramatic changes to the culture and pedagogy of universities. Hansen states that low-income students can't easily find the specific jobs and work experience required of them to fill subjective and speculative metrics. She goes on to state that "we know too little about how and when to identify, characterize, measure and develop the so-called noncognitive aspects of learning that this report asks colleges to evaluate. And I disagree that the gateway to college is the time or place to subject young people to the full impact of our ignorance about how to fairly assess things they should still be questioning and exploring -- like character, feelings, motives and values."

== Personal life ==
Hansen is married to Stanley Hansen, a speech pathologist. They have two children: Emma, a student at Macalester College in Saint Paul, Minnesota, and Isla, a student in Lewiston, Maine.

== Awards and honors ==
- Lindback Distinguished Teaching Award
- Elizabeth Topham Kennan Outstanding Educator Award (2009)

== Publications ==
Hansen has written literary critical articles, opinion editorials, and reviews as well as three books:

- Hansen, Elaine T. "Reading Wisdom in Old English Poetry". University of Toronto Press, Toronto, Ontario. (1988)
- Hansen, Elaine T. "Chaucer and the Fictions of Gender". University of California Press, Oakland, California. (1992)
- Hansen, Elaine T. "Mother Without Child: Contemporary Fiction and the Crisis of Motherhood". University of California Press, Oakland, California. (1997)
- Hansen, Elaine T. "Smart is not a dirty word". The Baltimore Sun. Baltimore, Maryland. (2014)
- Hansen, Elaine T. "Kindness Won't Cure College Admissions". Inside Higher Ed. Washington, D.C. (2016)

== See also ==
- List of Bates College people
- List of Johns Hopkins University people
- List of Haverford College people
- List of feminist theorists
