= Rowland Main Street Historic District =

Historic district in North Carolina, United States

- U.S. National Register of Historic Places
- U.S. Historic district
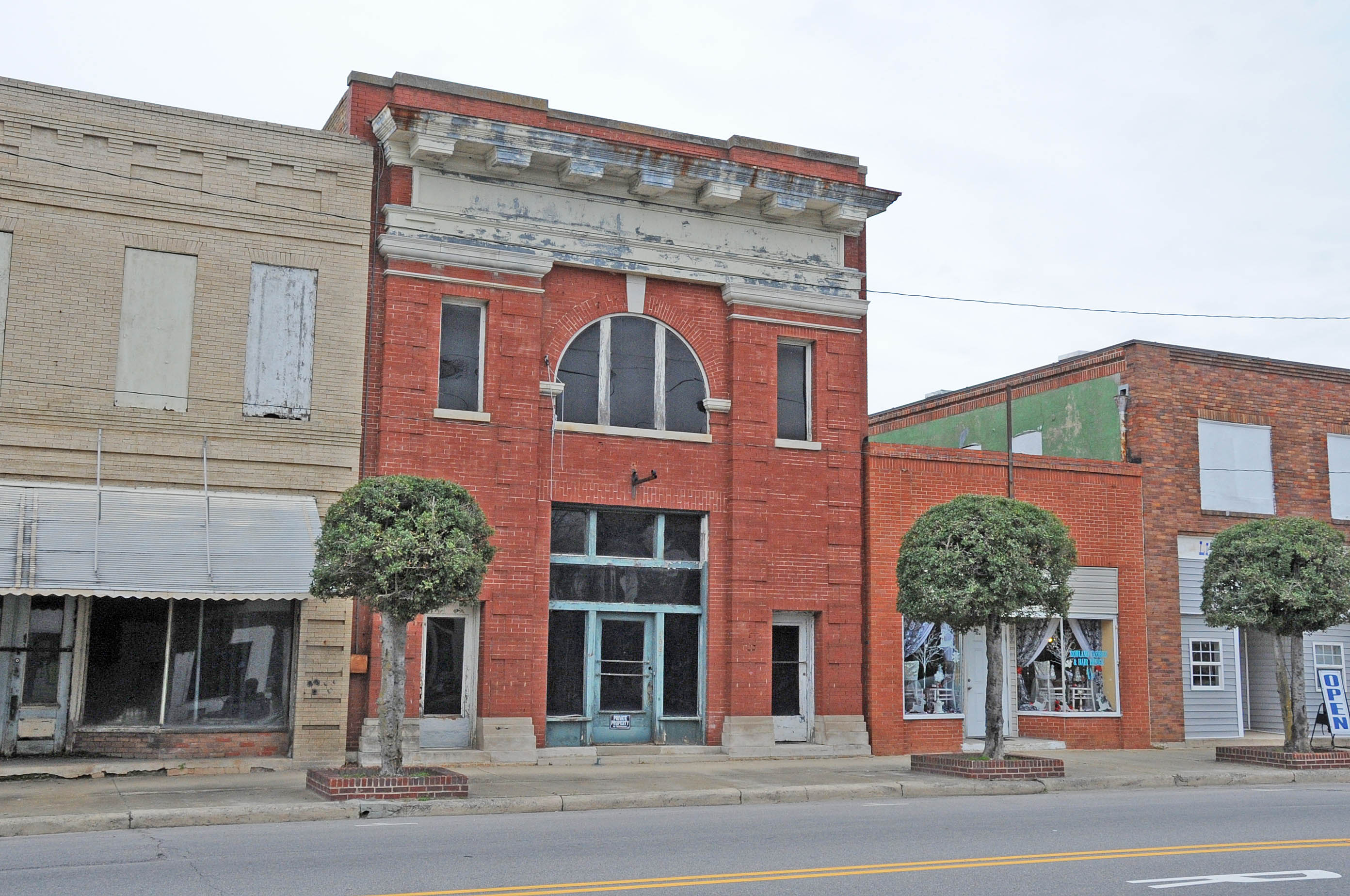

- Location within North Carolina Location within the United States
- Location: Roughly bounded by the 100 and 200 blocks of W. Main St., 100 blk of E. Main St., and Hickory and E and W Railroad Sts., Rowland, North Carolina
- Coordinates: 34°32′13″N 79°17′36″W
- Area: 12 acres (4.9 ha)
- Built: 1891
- Architectural style: Early Commercial, Bungalow/craftsman, et al.
- NRHP reference No.: 04001582
- Added to NRHP: February 2, 2005

Rowland Main Street Historic District is a national historic district located at Rowland, Robeson County, North Carolina. The district encompasses 35 contributing buildings and 1 contributing structure in the central business district of Rowland. It includes buildings built between about 1891 to 1954 in a variety of popular architectural styles including Bungalow / American Craftsman. Notable buildings include the S.L. Adams Grocery and General Store (1891), Hedgepath and Chitty Clothing and Shoe Store (1905), Kheiralla Brothers Store (c. 1920), Rowland Drug Company (1902), Merchants and Farmers Bank (1911), Former Fire Station (c. 1948), and Rolling Milling Company (c. 1940). Six buildings have stamped metal fronts manufactured from galvanized sheet iron by the Chattanooga Roofing and Foundry Company.

It was added to the National Register of Historic Places in 2005.
