= Centenary Methodist Church (Rowland, North Carolina) =

Historic church in North Carolina, United States

- U.S. National Register of Historic Places
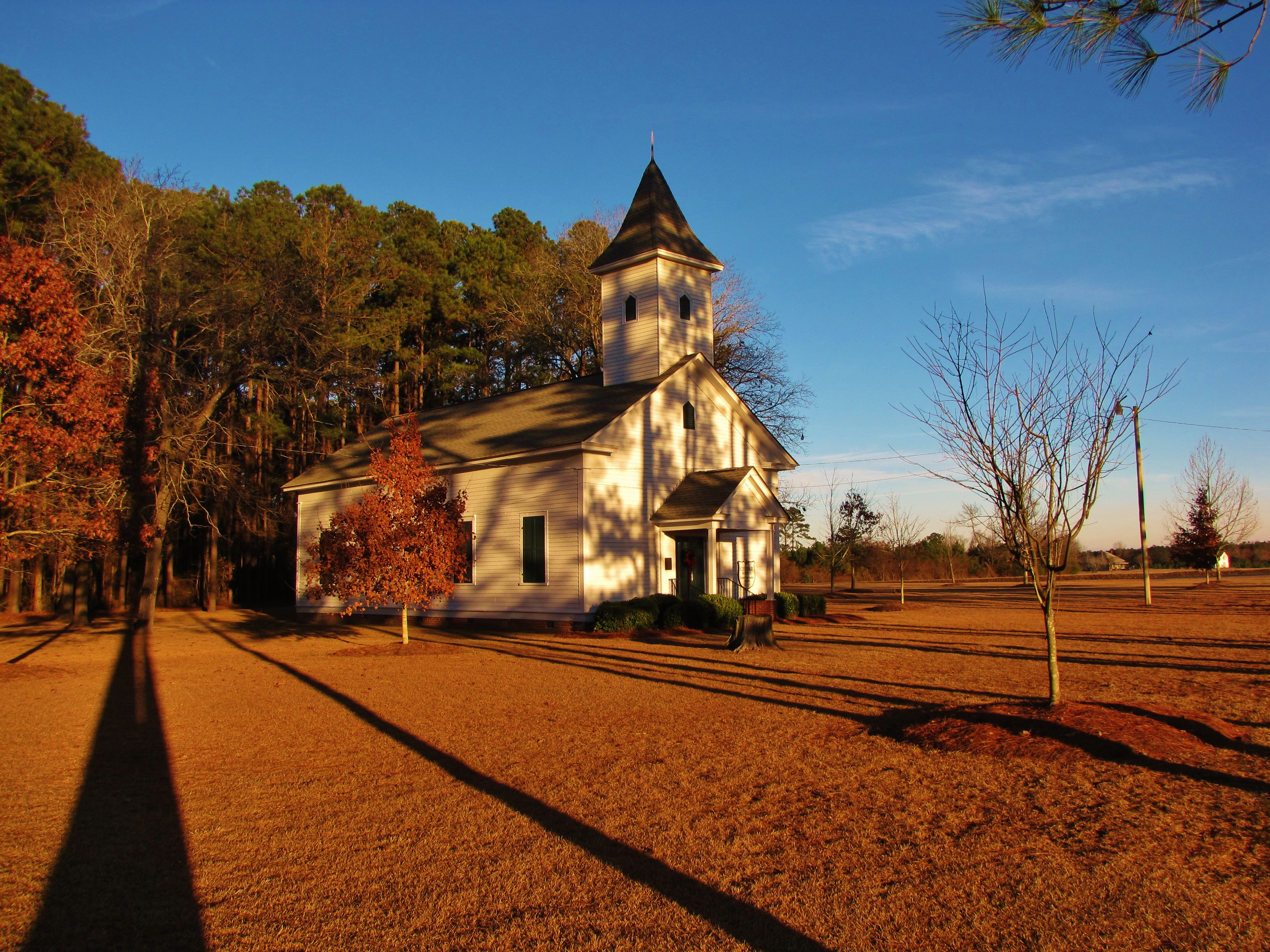
- Centenary Methodist Church in 2013

- Location within North Carolina Location within the United States
- Location: 2585 NC 130 E, jct. with NC 2462, near Rowland, North Carolina
- Coordinates: 34°29′33″N 79°15′6″W
- Area: 1.8 acres (0.73 ha)
- Built: 1885, 1903
- Architectural style: Classical Revival
- NRHP reference No.: 07000294
- Added to NRHP: April 10, 2007

Centenary Methodist Church, also known as Centenary Memorial United Methodist Church, is a historic Methodist church located at 2585 NC 130 E near Rowland, Robeson County, North Carolina. It was built in 1885, and enlarged and modified in the Classical Revival style in 1903. It is a one-story, gable front frame building with a rectangular steeple and vestibule. A gable-front portico with cornice returns, supported by two slender wood columns, was added to the church in 1982. Adjacent to the church is the contributing cemetery with approximately 160 marked graves.

It was added to the National Register of Historic Places in 2007.
