= Rowland station =

Historic train station in North Carolina, US

- Rowland Depot
- U.S. National Register of Historic Places
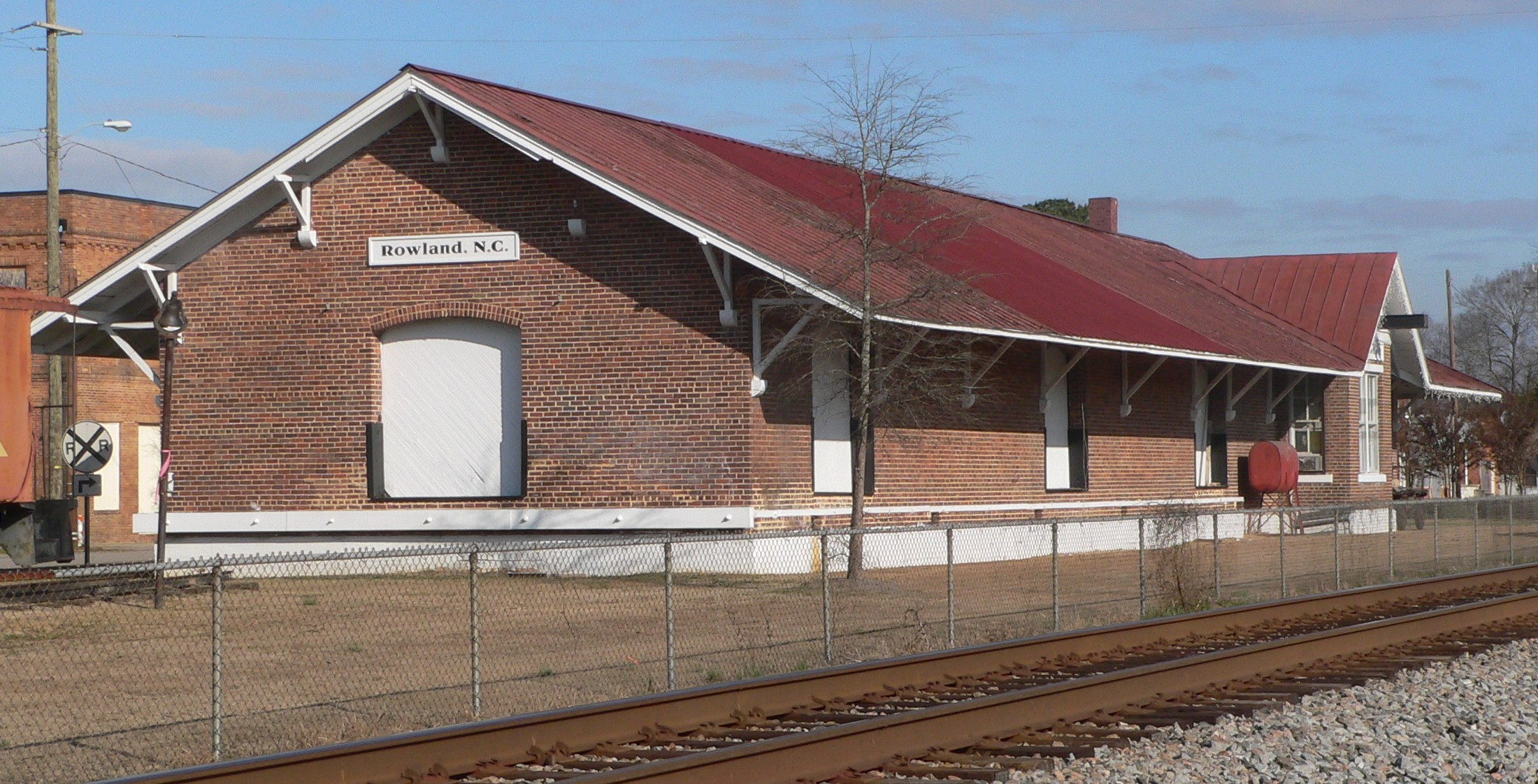
- Rowland Depot, December 2014

- Location within North Carolina Location within the United States
- Location: W. Main St. and W. Railroad St., Rowland, North Carolina
- Coordinates: 34°32′12″N 79°17′35″W
- Area: less than one acre
- Built: 1925
- Architectural style: Bungalow/craftsman
- NRHP reference No.: 01000511
- Added to NRHP: May 18, 2001

Rowland Depot is a historic train station located at Rowland, Robeson County, North Carolina. It was built in 1925 by the Atlantic Coast Line Railroad. It is a one-story, "L"-plan, hip roofed brick structure in the Bungalow / American Craftsman-style. It rests on a poured concrete foundation and the roof has wide, sheltering overhangs on the hipped main block and the gable end freight wing supported by Craftsman style triangular wooden brackets.

It was added to the National Register of Historic Places in 2001.

Preceding station	Atlantic Coast Line Railroad	Following station
Hamer toward Tampa	Main Line	Elrod toward Richmond
