= Clayton Spencer =

American academic (born 1954)

A. Clayton Spencer
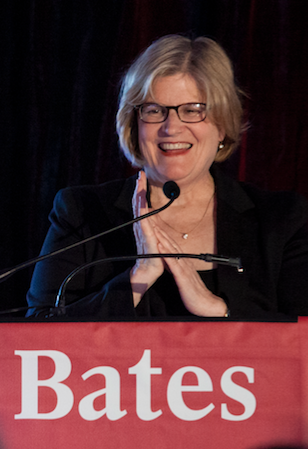

8th President of Bates College
- In office July 1, 2012 – July 1, 2023
- Provost: Matthew Auer; Malcolm Hill
- Preceded by: Elaine Tuttle Hansen
- Succeeded by: Garry Jenkins

Personal details
- Born: Ava Clayton Spencer; December 15, 1954 (age 71) Concord, North Carolina, U.S.
- Spouse: Ash Carter (divorced)
- Children: 2
- Relatives: Samuel Spencer (father)
- Education: Williams College (BA); University of Oxford (BA); Harvard University (MA); Yale University (JD)
- Website: www.bates.edu/president/

Ava Clayton Spencer (born December 15, 1954) is an American attorney. She was the eighth president of Bates College. She had previously served as the vice president for institutional policy at Harvard University from 2005 to 2012.

Her tenure over Bates saw a marked increase in financial assets, major campus expansion, and increased academic competitiveness.

== Early life and education ==
Spencer was born on December 15, 1954, in Concord, North Carolina, the daughter of Ava Clark Spencer and Samuel Reid Spencer, one of four children. Her father was a history professor who served as the president of Mary Baldwin College from 1957 to 1968 and Davidson College from 1968 to 1983. He attended Davidson and was trained at Harvard University. Her parents were progressive Southerners who raised Spencer during a time of widespread segregation. When Spencer was two, her family moved to Virginia for her father's first college presidency, then to North Carolina when she was 13 for years old for his second presidency. She graduated from Phillips Exeter Academy in 1973.

In 1977, Spencer earned her bachelor's degree from Williams College, magna cum laude and Phi Beta Kappa, with highest honors in history and German, then earned a Bachelor of Arts degree in theology from Oxford University in 1979. She received a Master of Arts in religion from Harvard University in 1982 and a Juris Doctor from Yale Law School in 1985, where she was an editor of the Yale Law Journal and winner of the Moot Court competition.

== Career ==
=== Government ===
Upon graduating law school, she clerked for Judge Rya W. Zobel of the U.S. District Court in Massachusetts from 1985 to 1986 and then practiced law at the Boston firm of Ropes & Gray from 1986 to 1989. Spencer served as an Assistant U.S. Attorney in Boston from 1989 to 1993 until becoming chief education counsel to the U.S. Senate Committee on Labor and Human Resources from 1993 to 1997 under U.S. Senator Ted Kennedy's chairmanship. She spoke highly of Kennedy stating, "He was hugely progressive and relentless in pursuing his goals, but very pragmatic. That was formative. You can be idealistic and get nothing done; or you can be idealistic, keep your eye on the ball, and take a set of practical steps to advance your goals.".

=== Harvard University ===
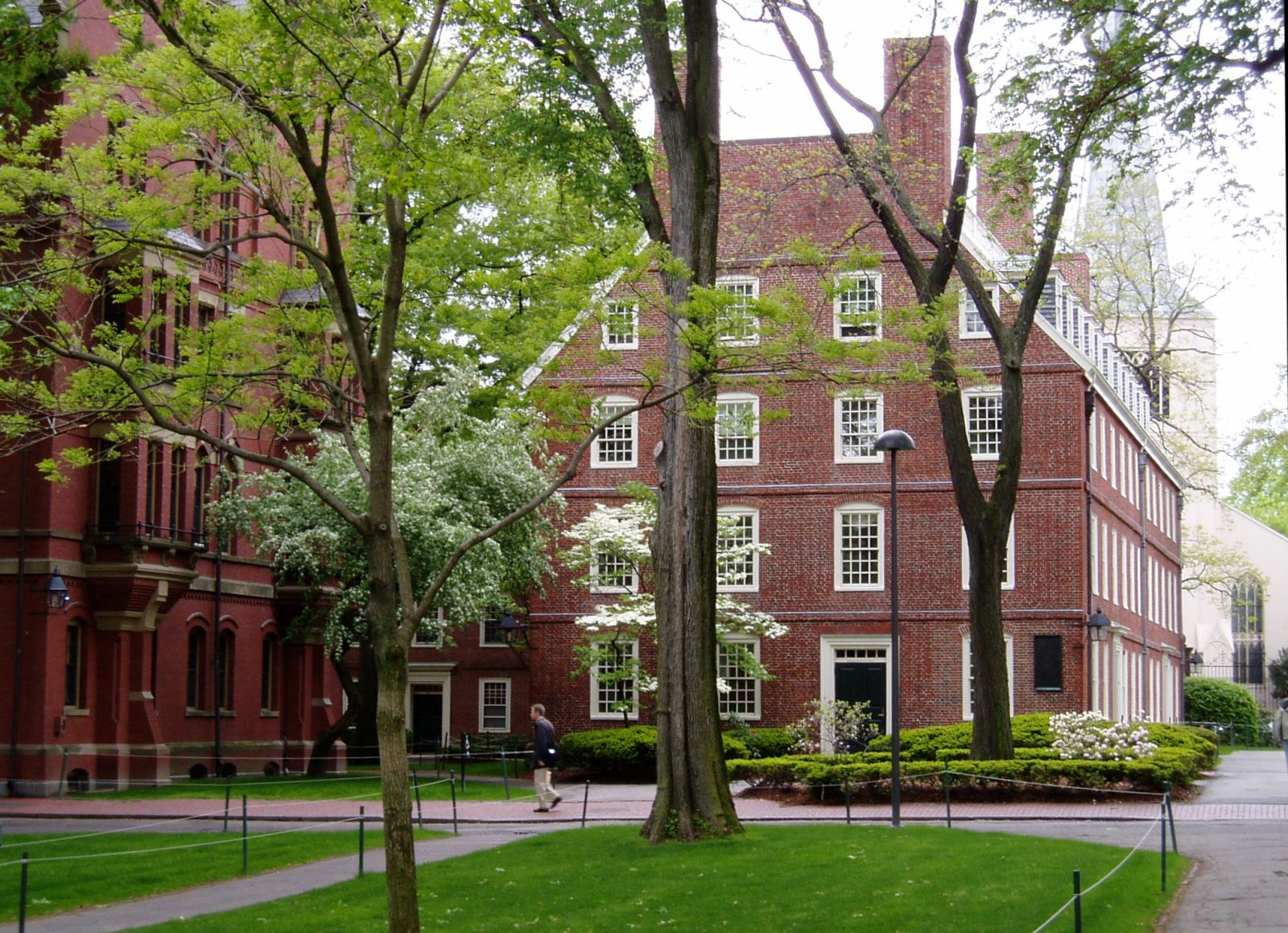
Spencer worked at Harvard University for 15 years; 1997 to 2012.

Spencer joined Harvard in February 1997 as a consultant for federal policy issues. The following year, she was appointed associate vice president for higher education policy reporting to the president, and quickly rose through the ranks to become the vice president for institutional policy. In January 2003, Spencer's profile, along with other Harvard faculty was filtered into then-student Mark Zuckerberg's newly created "Facemash", the site was shut down by Harvard's administration because it overloaded network switches and limited internet access.

==== Crimson Summer Academy ====
In 2003, Spencer co-founded the Harvard University Crimson Summer Academy (CSA) as a "a University program that draws local high-achieving, economically disadvantaged students to study at Harvard for six weeks each summer". The program has continued its original purpose, uninterrupted, for 20 years and is funded by the President's Office at Harvard University.

==== Harvard Financial Aid Initiative ====
According to the Harvard Magazine, one of Spencer's most notable accomplishments is her involvement in the 2004 Harvard Financial Aid Initiative. Her initial contributions spanned the formulation of the program and subsequently expanded the initiative across all of Harvard's outlets.

==== Harvard-Radcliffe merger ====
In this capacity she advocated for the merger of Harvard College and former women's college, Radcliffe College. Spencer and the executive board of the college merged the two institutions and founded the Radcliffe Institute for Advanced Study. She became the executive dean of the newly founded institute and frequently lectured at Harvard's Graduate School of Education.

While at Harvard, Spencer ended the Early Action Program, initiated the Task Force on the Arts along with Harvard president Drew Faust, and increased financial aid dramatically. Already widely considered as one of the most influential figures at Harvard, in 2005 she was appointed vice president for policy at Harvard University, serving until her appointment as president of Bates College in 2012.

=== Bates College ===
==== Tenure ====
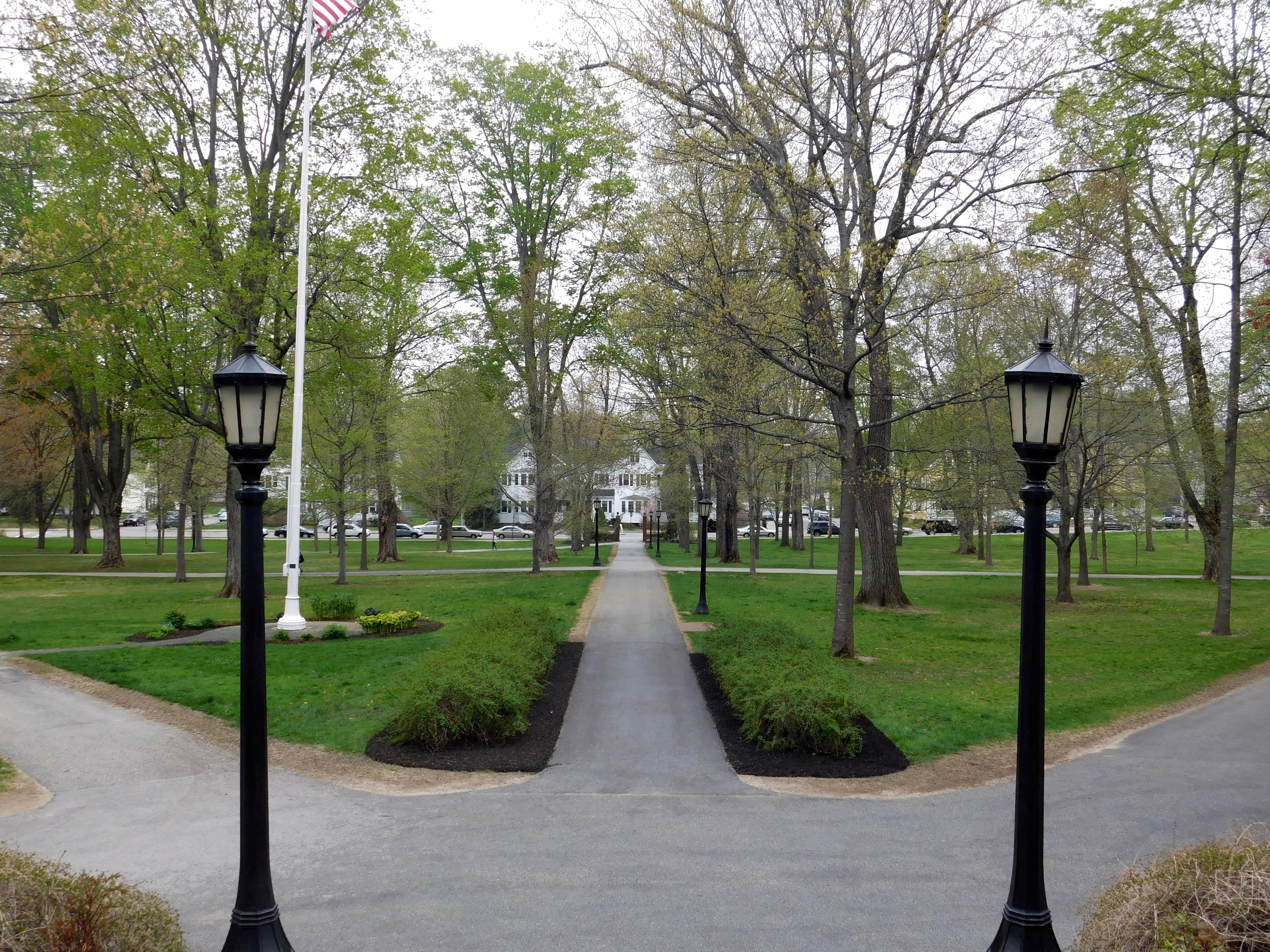
Spencer was inaugurated on the historical quad in July 2012.

On October 26, 2012, Spencer was installed as the eighth and second female President of Bates College, in Lewiston, Maine. Her inauguration speech, "Questions worth asking" drew 2,500 students, faculty, alumni, and members of the American collegiate educational system to Merrill Gymnasium. In her address, Spencer said, "At Bates, we claim this union of excellence and opportunity as a core element of our identity, and we need to continue to build on this deep aspect of who we are. As a practical matter, this means redoubling our efforts to recruit students from a wide range of backgrounds, and it means maintaining an unwavering commitment to financial aid."

Spencer assumed the presidency after the first female and 7th president of college–Elaine Tuttle Hansen–stepped down after a nine-year tenure to take a leadership position at Johns Hopkins University.

==== Endowment and fundraising ====
Spencer assumed an endowment that was heavily impacted by the 2008 financial crisis, thus reporting negative returns in the first two years. During her first year as president, 2012, Spencer raised $12.2 million in donations. At the conclusion of the second semester of the 2012/13 academic year, the Bates College Board of Trustees announced a totaled pool donation of $11.5 million to start the Catalyst Fund. Spencer would go on to expand the financial aid program by expending more of the college's endowment and indirect funding. In the 2013 fiscal year, the college reported Spencer's fundraising totaled $12 million. In 2014, Spencer introduced the option to donate capitalized securities, and saw a total of $16 million donated in the completed fiscal year.

In May 2015, Spencer's fundraising prompted Moody's Investors Service to upgrade the college's $24 million revenue bonds to an A1 rating. During the capital cycle of 2015, Spencer raised $21.6 million, $5.6 million more than the year before. On March 31, 2015, Spencer raised $250,000, the most ever secured in 24 hours by the college.

With the start of the 2016 academic year, she appointed committees to expand the college's curriculum, after a donation of $19 million was given to fund new areas of study and support incoming professors in the computer sciences. In the 2016 fiscal year, Spencer's team in the Office of College Advancement raised $28.2 million, which broke the 2006 record and marked the third year the college's fundraising has increased by 30 percent annually.

In May 2017, she launched the "Bates+You" fundraising campaign–the largest ever undertaken by the college–totaling $300 million to fund facilities, financial aid, the operational fund, and the endowment. The campaign was met with a $50 million donation from Michael Bonney, and has reached $160 million toward its total goal as of May 2017.

==== Public policy and outreach ====
At the 2014 White House Summit on College Opportunity, Spencer joined other U.S. higher education executives to meet with President Obama. She used the event to highlight the college's financial aid program, and recent donations, as well as calling for educational and financial reform. A year later in her comments on a proposed college ranking system was profiled in an article by the Wall Street Journal.

Spencer was profiled by Inside Higher Education in February 2016, where she stressed the college's established Digital and Computational Studies program and the importance of computer science in a liberal arts education. The announcement of the new area of study was profiled by Maine Public Broadcasting Network earlier that month.

In April 2016, she was interviewed by Time magazine, along with dean of admission and financial aid, Leigh Weisenburger. The two outlined college admissions in the coming academic years. In June 2016, Spencer was interviewed on New England Cable News' CEO Corner, where she outlined the college's history and the importance of a liberal arts education in a knowledge-based economy. On November 21, 2016, Spencer signed along with 250 other university presidents, a statement to the U.S. Congress and other elected officials to continue the Deferred Action for Childhood Arrivals (DACA) program at universities. The statement was prompted after President Donald Trump asserted that his administration would terminate the program‍—‌Spencer noted the DACA as "both a moral imperative and a national necessity."

In December 2017, she criticized the Tax Cuts and Jobs Act of 2017 for "constrict[ing] access to education", and undermining "the engine of innovation that has driven the national economy since the end of World War II."

==== Student life ====
Bates students had a Halloween tradition of participating in a late-night social event where seniors hosted themed parties in their off-campus houses which included underclassman touring the different houses and sampling various drinks. Spencer banned the tradition in 2014, citing "hundreds of noise complaints", student safety, underage drinking, multiple instances of destruction of property, student arrests, and student-police violence". Her choice to do so was widely criticized by student newspapers in the NESCAC. Spencer went on to announce that more funding was to be allocated for late-night programming stating, "part of the job is figuring out what the alternatives are."

In March 2015, the Bates College Student Government passed a nearly unanimous vote-of-no-confidence against Spencer and her Vice-President of Student Affairs, Joshua McIntosh. The vote was in response to her decision to suspend and eventually terminate an employment contract with a member of the college's staff. Students representatives charged the administration with violating the Civil Rights Act of 1964 and the Americans with Disabilities Act of 1990. Spencer noted the student's withdrawal of confidence and stated, "recent events confirm what I know to be true — that students care deeply about this college, as do faculty and staff on campus, and alumni of every generation. Students also rightly want and expect to be included in the discussions and decisions that shape their own experience and the way the college moves forward."

On November 7, 2016, a day before the 2016 U.S. presidential election, a Bates student discovered that Lewiston townspeople were distributing flyers at the college which asserted that in order to vote in the upcoming election, students were required to change their driver's license to feature a Lewiston residency and re-register any vehicles students had in the city. Under 2016-17 Maine State law, this was not required, which lead Spencer to label the situation as "a deliberate attempt at voter suppression". The Governor of Maine, Paul LePage asserted the flyer's validity stating "Democrats for decades have encouraged college students from out of state to vote in Maine, even though there is no way to determine whether these college students also voted in their home states." Spencer's comments were reiterated and supported by the Maine Democratic Party leader, Phil Bartlett, and Maine Secretary of State Matt Dunlap.

=== Other work ===
In April 2015, Spencer was appointed to the American Council on Education, "the nation's largest and most influential advocacy organization representing colleges and universities." Her appointment was commented on by the council's president saying: "[Spencer] has been a part of almost every major discussion involving higher education policy over the last 20 years, her work on Capitol Hill, at Harvard and now at Bates gives her a unique and important perspective — particularly during this time of dynamic change in higher education. We are extremely pleased to have Clayton join the board and greatly appreciate her commitment to helping guide the work of ACE." Her term on the board is set to expire in 2018.

Spencer has been elected numerous boards and committees, most notably Williams College and Phillips Exeter Academy.

== Personal life ==
Spencer resides in Lewiston, Maine. Spencer was married to United States Secretary of Defense Ash Carter, with whom she has two children, William and Ava Carter.

== Awards and honors ==
- In 1979, Spencer received the Williams College's Carroll A. Wilson Fellowship
- In 1997, Spencer won Williams College's Bicentennial Medal; for "[her] contributions that have helped countless students fulfill their dreams and have strengthened America."
- In 2014, she was mentioned among "Maine's 50 Most Influential People" by Maine, the magazine.
- In 2015, she received a Doctor of Civil Law (DCL) honorary degree from Bishop's University in Sherbrooke, Quebec, Canada.
- In 2017, she received the Harvard Medal from the Harvard Alumni Association (HAA) of Harvard University.
