= Devin Gaines =

American scholar (1984–2007)

Devin Thomas Gaines (July 16, 1984 – July 10, 2007) was a college student at the University of Connecticut who attracted media attention by earning five bachelor's degrees simultaneously on May 6, 2007. Months later, he died in a drowning accident.

== Early life ==
Gaines, from Stamford, Connecticut, was raised in childhood by his single mother in public housing after his father died of a heart attack when Gaines was nine years old. He attended both King Low Heywood Thomas School and Stamford High School, graduating from the latter. After high school graduation, Gaines was accepted at the University of Connecticut, where he was the recipient of a University of Connecticut leadership scholarship, and a scholarship from the Jackie Robinson Foundation.

Gaines then matriculated at the University of Connecticut in 2002, graduating five years later in May 2007 with five bachelor's degrees. During his time at Connecticut, Gaines completed 276 credits, earning bachelor's degrees in computer science, cognitive science, theater studies, linguistics, psychology, and an individualized degree in cinema, culture and cognition.

While at Connecticut, Gaines was inducted as a member of the Psi Chi and Upsilon Pi Epsilon honor societies, and had been accepted for a master's degree in educational communication and technology at New York University.

== Career ==
At the time of his death, Gaines was working as an information technology associate for Pension Associates, a tax consulting firm.

== Death and memorials ==
On July 10, 2007, Gaines, aged 22, drowned in Deep River, Connecticut, in Blakeslee Pond, a gravel pit quarry on private property, while swimming with friends in an area marked "No Trespassing" which was known to be hazardous to swimmers. His death was ruled an accidental drowning. According to quotes from his sister, Gaines was not a swimmer.

After his death, the University of Connecticut pre-engineering program established a scholarship program in Gaines's memory, and the university's Stamford campus renamed its student activities center the Devin T. Gaines Student Involvement and Activities Center in his honor.
