= Julian Stanley =

American psychologist (1918–2005)

- Born: Julian Cecil Stanley; July 9, 1918; Macon, Georgia, U.S.
- Died: August 12, 2005 (aged 87)
- Education: Georgia Southern University; Harvard University (EdM, EdD)
- Known for: Study of Mathematically Precocious Youth (SMPY)
- Awards: Association for Psychological Science; AERA Award for Distinguished Contributions to Research in Education (1980)
- Scientific career
- Fields: Psychometrics
- Workplaces: Vanderbilt University; Stanford University; Johns Hopkins University

Julian Cecil Stanley (July 9, 1918 – August 12, 2005) was an American psychologist. He was an advocate of accelerated education for academically gifted children. He founded the Johns Hopkins University Center for Talented Youth (CTY), as well as a related research project, the Study of Mathematically Precocious Youth (SMPY), whose work has, since 1980, been supplemented by the Julian C. Stanley Study of Exceptional Talent (SET), which provides academic assistance to gifted children. Stanley was also widely known for his classic book, coauthored with Donald Campbell, on the design of educational and psychological research - Experimental and Quasi-experimental Designs for Research.

== Early life and education ==
Julian Cecil Stanley Jr. was born in Macon, Georgia, on July 9, 1918. After finishing high school he attended West Georgia Junior College (1936)— now the State University of West Georgia—and at age 19 years, after attending the Georgia Teacher's College (1937)—now the Georgia Southern University—he became a high school math and chemistry teacher. During the Second World War he served in the Army Air Corps' chemical warfare service (1942–1945). Upon his return, he entered Harvard University, where he completed his doctorate in education (Ed.D.) in 1950.

== Academic career ==
Stanley's first academic teaching position was as an associate professor in educational psychology at the George Peabody College for Teachers (1949) - now Peabody College of Vanderbilt University. In 1951 he became President of the Tennessee Psychological Association before moving onto the University of Wisconsin in 1953. It was here that he became famous for his work in experimental designs and psychometrics; his most cited work, Experimental and Quasi-experimental Designs for Research, was produced with co-author Donald T. Campbell (1963). In 1965, he moved to Stanford University, becoming a fellow of Stanford's Center for Advanced Study in the Behavioral Sciences, and then onto the final chapter of his career, at Johns Hopkins University. It was here that he began his work with intellectually gifted youth, creating in 1971 the Study of Mathematically Precocious Youth (SMPY), which would eventually lead to a revolution in how gifted children were to be identified and treated within the education system. He retired as Professor Emeritus in the Department of Psychological and Brain Sciences (1992), although reportedly worked up until one week before his death in 2005 at age 87 years.

== Study of Mathematically Precocious Youth ==
When Stanley was a young math and science teacher he became fascinated with intellectual talent while taking a "tests and measurements" course at the University of Georgia. However, it was in 1969 that Stanley's interest with intellectually gifted youth was reignited when he was introduced to Joseph Bates, a 13-year-old boy from Baltimore, Maryland. Joseph was outperforming all of his classmates in mathematics. Stanley decided to test him using the SAT and found that it was a much more effective and reliable way to test for both advanced math and verbal skills and reasoned that such a method could be used to identify more of these high-ability students, especially if a systematic approach was taken. Seeing a need for more research and development in mathematical reasoning ability, Stanley submitted a proposal to the Spencer Foundation of Chicago, which also had an interest in intellectual talent, to help fund his study.

On September 1, 1971, the Study of Mathematically Precocious Youth (SMPY) was formed at Johns Hopkins University. It began as a project designed to model the longitudinal study by Lewis M. Terman in the "Genetic Studies of Genius" series. The project primarily included holding talent searches with the intent of identifying gifted youth, particularly in the area of mathematics; one such student was a future Fields medalist from Australia named Terence Tao. Stanley said that Tao had the greatest mathematical reasoning ability he had found in years of intensive searching.

The study then proceeded to examine both short- and long-term results of the students identified through this method. Stanley was also invested in helping them to further their education by devising and offering many different acceleration programs and classes. At the time, there was very little research to support acceleration, with educators often pushing gifted youths and their parents towards enrichment instead, as it seemed best to avoid attracting too much attention to the unusual abilities of these students and thereby make it easier for educators within the current system at the time to deal with their intellectual capabilities. Up until the time of Stanley's study, there was the prevalent idea that cultural assimilation, stemming from the melting pot ideology featured prominently within the United States’ immigration policies, was also a factor in educators veering away from providing acceleration opportunities for gifted students.

The very first talent search was held in March 1972; 450 Baltimore grade 7 and 8 students took the SAT-M (School Aptitude Test-Math), which had previously only been taken by students in grades 11 and 12. This out-of-level testing method proved to be so successful in identifying intellectual talent and furthering the education of youths in ways that were deemed not to detract from social and emotional development, that the program continued with great achievement. Eventually, verbal capabilities were added to the searches (SAT-V), and the program expanded to other universities (Duke, Northwestern, Iowa, and Denver). The program was also deemed to have predictive validity, reasons for which this type of testing has now become a standardized method of identifying early intellectually precocious youth, both within the United States and internationally. To date, the program has identified and provided acceleration for millions of gifted youth. At Johns Hopkins University, the program is now called the Julian C. Stanley Study of Exceptional Talent (SET). The Study of Mathematically Precocious Youth (SMPY) continues at Vanderbilt University today, with former colleagues of Stanley working to complete a fifty-year longitudinal study of gifted individuals. Currently, there are 5,000 previous students involved who are now nearing mid-life.

In 1994, Stanley was one of 52 signatories on "Mainstream Science on Intelligence", an editorial written by Linda Gottfredson and published in the Wall Street Journal, which declared the consensus of the signing scholars on intelligence research.

== Other achievements ==
Julian Stanley wrote or edited 13 books, produced over 500 professional articles, received two honorary doctorates and numerous awards, including:

- Fellow of the American Statistical Association (1967)
- APA's E.L. Thorndike Award (1978)
- James McKeen Cattell Award from the Association for Psychological Science (1994)
- AERA's Award for Distinguished Contributions to Research in Education (1980)
- NAGC's Distinguished Scholar Award (1982)
- Mensa Lifetime Achievement Award (2000)

== Selected publications ==
=== Books/edited books ===
- Educating the Gifted: Acceleration and Enrichment. (1979). Baltimore, MD: Johns Hopkins University Press. (with W.C. George, and Sanford J. Cohn)
- Experimental and Quasi-Experimental Designs for Research. (1966). Chicago, IL: Rand McNally. (with Donald T. Campbell)
- Statistical Methods in Education and Psychology. (1970). Prentice-Hall. (with Gene V Glass)
- Mathematical Talent: Discovery, Description, and Development: Proceedings from the Hyman Blumberg Symposium on Research in Early Childhood. (1974). Baltimore, MD: Johns Hopkins University Press.
- Compensatory Education For Children, Ages Two To Eight: Recent Studies Of Educational Intervention; Proceedings. (1973). Baltimore, MD: Johns Hopkins University Press.
- Preschool Programs. (1972). Baltimore, MD: Johns Hopkins University Press.
- Preschool Programs for the Disadvantaged: Five Experimental Approaches to Early Childhood Education. (1972). Baltimore, MD: Johns Hopkins University Press.
- The Gifted and the Creative: A Fifty-Year Perspective. (1977). Baltimore, MD: Johns Hopkins University Press.
- Academic Precocity: Aspects of Its Development. (1983). Baltimore, MD: Johns Hopkins University Press. (with Camilla P. Benbow)
- Educational and Psychological Measurement and Evaluation (8th ed.). (1997). Prentice-Hall. (with Kenneth D. Hopkins)

=== Selected chapters ===
- Reliability. In R. L. Thorndike (Ed.), (1971). Educational measurement (2nd ed., pp. 356–442). Washington, DC: American Council on Education.
- Mathematics taught at a fast pace: A longitudinal evaluation of SMPY's first class. In C. P. Benbow & J. C. Stanley (1983). (Eds.), Academic Precocity: Aspects of its Development (pp. 51–78). Baltimore, MD: Johns Hopkins University Press. (with C.P. Benbow, & S. Perkins)
- An eight-year evaluation of SMPY: What was learned? In C. P. Benbow & J. C. Stanley (1983). (Eds.), Academic Precocity: Aspects of its Development (pp. 205–214). Baltimore, MD: Johns Hopkins University Press. (with C.P. Benbow)
- Intellectually talented students: The key is curricular flexibility. In S. Paris et al.((1983). Eds.), Learning and Motivation in the Classroom (pp. 259-281). Hillsdale, NJ: Erlbaum. (with C.P. Benbow)
- Gender differences on eighty-six nationally standardized aptitude and achievement tests. In N. Colangelo et al.(1992).(Eds.), Talent Development: Proceedings of the Henry B. and Jocelyn Wallace National Research Symposium on Talent Development (pp. 42-65). Unionville, NY: Trillium Press. (with C.P. Benbow, L.E. Brody, & S.L. Dauber)

=== Selected articles ===
- Varieties of intellectual talent. Journal of Creative Behavior, 1977, 31(2), 93-119. doi:10.1002/j.2162-6057.1997.tb00783.x
- Sex differences in mathematical ability: Fact or artifact? Science, 1980, 210, 1262-1264.(with C.P. Benbow).
- Using the SAT to find intellectually talented seventh graders. College Board Review, 1981–82, 122, 2-7, 26. (with C.P. Benbow)
- Consequences in high school and college of sex differences in mathematical reasoning ability: A longitudinal perspective. American Educational Research Journal, 1982, 19, 598-622. (with C.P. Benbow)
- Educating mathematically precocious youths: Twelve policy recommendations. Educational Researcher, 1982, 11, 4-9. (with C.P. Benbow)
- Extremely young college graduates: Evidence of their success. College and University, 1983, 58, 361-371. (with C.P. Benbow)
- SMPY’s first decade: Ten years of posing problems and solving them. Journal of Special Education, 1983, 17, 11- 25. (with C.P. Benbow)
- Opening doors for the gifted. American Education, 1983, 19, 44-46. (with C.P. Benbow)
- Sex differences in mathematical reasoning ability: More facts. Science, 1983, 222, 1029-1031. (with C.P. Benbow)
- Structure of intelligence of intellectually precocious children and in their parents. Intelligence, 1983, 7, 129-152. (with C.P. Benbow, M.K. Kirk, & A.B. Zonderman)
- Applying: A Mentor Model: For Young Mathematically Talented Students. Gifted Child Today, 1990, 13, 15–19. doi:10.1177/107621759001300205 (with A.E. Lupkowski, & S.G. Assouline)

Educational offices
Preceded by Benjamin Bloom	President of the American Educational Research Association; 1966-1967	Succeeded by John Goodlad
