= Centre for Talented Youth Ireland =

Educational programme for high-ability young persons in Ireland

Coordinates: 53.38604°N 6.26105°W

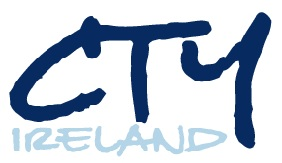
- Formation: 1992
- Headquarters: Dublin City University
- Location: Ireland
- Key people: Dr. Colm O'Reilly
- Website: CTYI

The Centre for Talented Youth Ireland (CTYI) is a programme for students of high academic ability between the ages of six and seventeen in Ireland.

There are sibling projects around the world, most notably the CTY programme at Johns Hopkins University, the original model for CTY Ireland. CTY students are eligible to participate in CTY's summer sessions for older students. CTY was founded in 1992, with its first summer programme running in 1993, and is based at Dublin City University in Glasnevin, Dublin 9. The centre offers various courses for gifted students as well as conducting research and promoting the needs of the talented in Ireland.

Currently, it caters for 5,000 students a year. Its current director is Colm O'Reilly.

== Eligibility ==
Eligibility for CTYI's programmes is based on scores in the School and College Ability Test. Students who score within the top 5th percentile are eligible for the top tier of CTY programmes, and those who score within the top 10th percentile are eligible for a second tier, CAT, while students who score within the top 15th percentile are eligible for a third tier, the Summer Scholars programme.

CTYI also allows for bright and motivated students to partake in courses such as correspondence courses, and scholarships can be attained for EUE or the secondary school summer programme. Students can also attend on a psychologist's recommendation.

== Programmes ==
=== Primary school programmes ===
Saturday courses are offered for primary school students at various colleges and institutes of technology around Ireland throughout the year. There are courses for both the 6–7 age group and the 8–13 group. DCU also run classes on Wednesday afternoons.

=== Secondary school programmes ===
A summer programme for 12–17 year-olds (1st – 5th year) as part of CAT or CTY runs only at DCU premises. These courses give students the opportunity to study college-style and college-level courses intensively for three weeks in the summer in one of two sessions, each of which lasts three weeks.

Because of the Irish financial situation in the mid-2000s, fewer people were able to afford the cost of the programme, especially after the Government cut CTYI's funding in 2009. Since, the age bracket has been increased to include children up to age seventeen.

Some of the students at the summer programme come from overseas, mostly from continental countries such as Spain, Portugal, and Italy. Owing to the intensive nature of the programme, a substantial proportion of the 190–280 students who attend each session are residential, living in student accommodation for the duration of the course. However, students can also commute, attending the course as the residential students do but going home at the end of the day and returning in the morning.

In 2026, the following courses were offered:

- Actuarial Maths
- Animation
- Archaeology
- Astronomy
- Civil & Structural Engineering
- Cognitive Psychology
- Criminology
- Cult Psychology
- Electronic Engineering
- Filmmaking
- Forensic Science
- Game Theory
- General Engineering
- Law
- Machine Learning & AI
- Medicine
- Musicology
- Nanoscience
- Neurodiversity & Psychology
- Novel Writing
- Pharmaceutical Science
- Philosophy
- Theatre & Stage
- Theoretical Physics
- Vet Science
- War & Conflict

The CAT (for children in the 85th to 95th percentile) version of the programme ends after two weeks and so has a slightly different course matter.

Weekdays in the summer programme are highly structured, with classes from 9am to 3pm, with a lunch break. Activities take place from 3pm to 5pm, supervised by the residential assistants (RAs), while from 5pm and 6pm students have dinner. After dinner students are required to attend a meeting with their RA group until 6:30pm. 6:30pm to 8:30pm is taken up by the study period, which is supervised by the teaching assistant, and social time takes place between 8:30pm and 10pm, with lights-out at 10.30pm.

On weekends, social activities such as discos, shopping trips, visits to the cinema, excursions to various interesting sights in Ireland and talent shows are organised.

=== Early University Entrance ===
EUE is a programme for Transition Year students in secondary school. Like the summer programme, it runs on a DCU campus, with students covering two modules (equivalent to what a first year college student in DCU would study) over a semester, one day a week each week, each day having at least 2 different subjects. For Semester 1 2026/27, courses offered include Biology, Business, Computer Science, Engineering, International Relations, Law, Philosophy, Physics, Psychology and Sports Science. EUE is open to CAT- and CTY-qualifying students.

=== Other courses ===
The centre runs correspondence courses throughout the year for 12- to 16-year-olds and also for Transition Year students who do not have to fulfil any aptitude test requirements. Courses include or have included Writing By Mail, Journalism, Psychology, Philosophy, Legal Studies, and Science of Tomorrow. There are also correspondence courses for younger students (8–13) in computing-related subjects and Writing By Mail.

== Staff ==
=== Permanent ===
Dr. Colm O'Reilly – Director

Dr. Catriona Ledwith – Assistant Director

Dr. Leeanne Hinch – Academic Coordinator

Dr. Orla Dunne – Residential Coordinator

Ms. Lynne Mooney – Young Student Manager

Ms. Linda Murphy – Post-Primary Manager

Ms. Ruth Lally- Post-Primary Administrator

Ms. Cathy Woods – Early University Entrance Administrator

Ms. Hazel Skinner - Early University Entrance Administrator

=== Contract staff ===
As the on-site programmes available for students are part-time and/or short-term, most of the staff associated with these programmes are contracted for a set period of time. Residential staff are hired for either 3 or 6 weeks (summer programme only) while academic staff are hired for 3 weeks, 6 weeks, or on a part-time basis during the year (e.g. an eight-week Saturday course).

==== Assistant Residential Coordinators (ARCs) ====
These staff (usually 2, 1 male and 1 female) are responsible for the care of the students at CTYI during the 12–17 summer courses. They live in the residences with the students and are the highest-ranking staff members when the Residential Coordinator is absent (e.g., at night). They are in charge of the RAs also. ARCs are often ex-RAs, who return to hold a higher point of authority. An ARC may hold the position for a number of years running, e.g. former ARC Mary Heslin held the position for 4 years running.

==== Residential Assistants (RAs) ====
RAs are responsible for the care their RA group (normally a group of 18–22 students) and they report to the ARCs. Any residential students will bring up issues with their RAs. They may also act as mentors to the students if they are having problems settling in. Typically there is a mix between former CTYI students and those who have not attended the programme.

==== Instructors ====
Instructors are generally professionals or postgraduate students who are willing to give up 3 weeks of a year to work with CTYI's students. They are hired on the basis of specialist knowledge in a particular field and a rapport with young people. Some are former CTYI students and/or have worked on the programme as RAs or TAs. In the past they have included lecturers at DCU, but stricter regulations within the university now prohibit DCU staff from taking on 'a second contract'.

==== Teaching Assistant (TA) ====
A TA's primary function is to assist the instructor during class time and supervision and assisting students during study period.

==== Coordinator ====
On the part-time programmes during the year, additional administrative staff are hired to co-ordinate Saturday programmes.

== Funding cut, 2009 ==
It was announced in the post-crash 2009 Irish budget that the government would not continue directly contributing to CTYI funding. Up to 2008, the Department of Education had been providing the course with a grant of €97,000. The move to withdraw funding was criticised by CTYI staff but a spokesperson for the Department of Education said that "the resources available for next year meant that difficult choices had to be made and the abolition of the grant to the Centre for Talented Youth was one of those tough decisions." The government had previously planned to allow CTYI to become a national mandate.

== See also ==
- CTY
- Dublin City University
- Transition Year
- SCAT
