= Ashpole Presbyterian Church =

Historic church in North Carolina, United States

- U.S. National Register of Historic Places
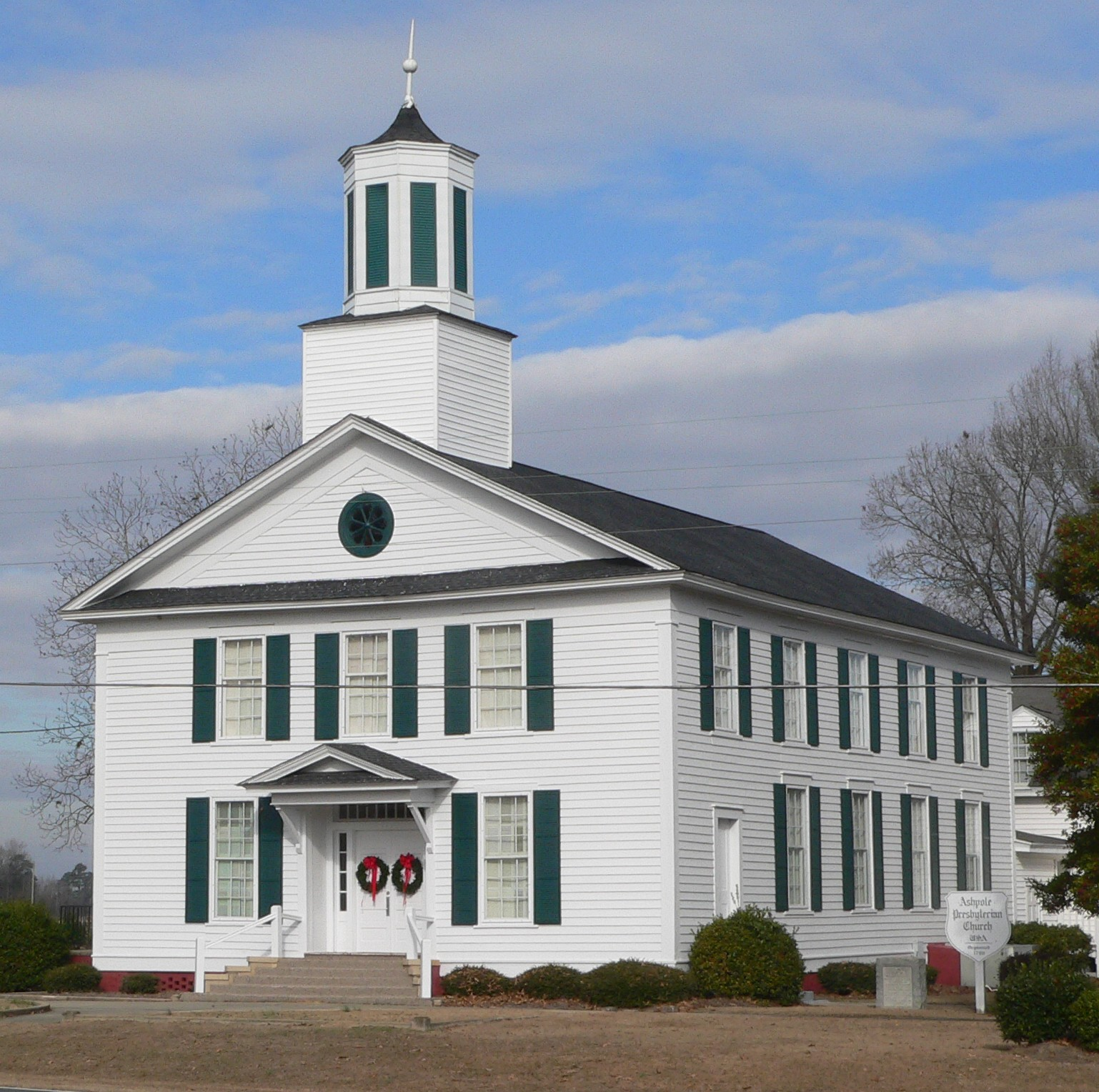

- Location within North Carolina Location within the United States
- Location: 192 Ashpole Church Rd., near Rowland, North Carolina
- Coordinates: 34°33′0″N 79°18′37″W
- Area: 7 acres (2.8 ha)
- Built: 1860-1865
- Architectural style: Greek Revival
- NRHP reference No.: 82001302
- Added to NRHP: October 19, 1982

Ashpole Presbyterian Church is a historic Presbyterian church located near Rowland, Robeson County, North Carolina. It was built in 1860 and is a two-level, three bay by five bay, Greek Revival style frame church. It features an octagonal belfry with a concave cap roof that rests on a tall, square base. At the rear of the church is a modern educational building. Also on the property are the contributing 1 1/2-story manse, a square hip-roofed well house, and two-story barn.

Ashpole Presbyterian Church was established in 1796, the merging of Ashpole Meeting House and Shoe Heel Church. The Ashpole community from which the church took its name dated from 1750, and was settled by English, Welsh, and Scottish settlers. Some early preachers delivered their services in Gaelic to benefit the non-English speakers in the congregation. The church was built on land owned by James Robert Adair; a marker in his memory sits in front of the church.

The original Ashpole Church building was a log structure, with hand-hewn pine timbers held together with pegs and handmade nails. The current structure was constructed in 1860, and includes a second-floor gallery used for worship services by slaves during the Civil War years. During the Civil War, both Union and Confederate forces used the church for religious services as well as a hospital.

Ashpole Presbyterian Church founded a Ladies Missionary Society in 1885, sending female members of the congregation to Oklahoma in the 1890s and Korea in 1909 to spread the gospel.

It was added to the National Register of Historic Places in 1982.

Robeson County Heritage Book Committee, Our Heritage: Robeson County, North Carolina, 1748-2002 (2002)

C. J. McCallum and Lucie M. McCallum, Historical Sketch of Ashpole Presbyterian Church, Rowland, North Carolina, 1796-1996 (1996)
