= Joseph Monroe (computer scientist) =

African American computer scientist

- Born: May 18, 1936; Rowland, North Carolina, U.S.
- Education: North Carolina A&T State University (B.A.); Texas A&M University (M.S., Ph.D.)
- Known for: Second African American to earn a Ph.D. in computer science; founding member of Upsilon Pi Epsilon
- Awards: United States Air Force Legion of Merit Service Medal (1974, 1978, 1982); United States Department of Defense Superior Service Medal (1987); National Technical Achiever of the Year (1992)
- Scientific career
- Fields: Computer science; Electrical engineering
- Workplaces: U.S. Air Force Academy; Fayetteville State University; North Carolina A&T State University

Joseph Monroe (born May 18, 1936) is an American computer scientist and the second African American in history to earn a Ph.D. in computer science. He served on the faculties of the U.S. Air Force Academy, Fayetteville State University, and North Carolina A & T State University, and was a founding member of Upsilon Pi Epsilon.

== Early life and education ==
Monroe was born in Rowland, North Carolina on May 18, 1936. He graduated from North Carolina A&T State University in Greensboro, North Carolina in 1962 with bachelor’s degrees in mathematics, English, and French. He received a master's degree in computer science in 1967 from Texas A & M University and earned his Ph.D. in computer science from the same university in 1972. There is a misconception that Monroe was the first African American to earn a Ph.D. in computer science. However, Clarence Ellis in 1969 was the first.

== Career ==
Shortly after acquiring his doctorate, Monroe accepted a commission from the U.S. Air Force as a second lieutenant while also working for the U.S. Air Force Academy as an associate professor. From 1978 he served as chair of the computer science department, chair of the department of electrical engineering, and the dean of the faculty. He was appointed as a full professor, becoming the first African American to serve as a full professor for the U.S. Air Force Academy and the first African American professor to be given a tenure permanent professorship at a service academy of the United States.

During his tenure, Monroe developed several military computer systems, completing projects including the U.S. Army Personnel System, U.S. Air Force Logistics systems, U.S. Air Force Manpower System, and the Armed Forces Intelligence Data Handling System. He joined the faculty of Fayetteville State University in Fayetteville, North Carolina in 1987. He held both administrative and academic positions on the University's staff. After four years of serving on their faculty, he returned to North Carolina A & T State University where he was subsequently named Ronald E. McNair Endowed Professor and Chair of Computer Science in 1991.

He was a founding member of Upsilon Pi Epsilon, the first international honor society dedicated to the disciplines of computing & information.

== Personal life ==
Monroe's father was a tenant farmer and Joseph grew up with eight siblings. He married Sallie McNair, also from Rowland, who died on March 27, 2022. They had two sons, one of whom, Joseph Jr., became a NASA consultant, and the other, Robert, became an officer in the Air Force.

== Awards and honors ==
Monroe has been the recipient of several awards from the United States Air Force Academy including the 1974, 1978, and 1982 United States Air Force Legion of Merit Service Medal for Outstanding Teaching and Research, and the 1987 United States Department of Defense Superior Service Medal for Superior Teaching and Research.

The National Technical Achievers Association of Houston named Monroe National Technical Achiever of the Year in 1992. He was awarded the 1972 Association for Computing Machinery Award from New York City as the first African American to receive a computer science Ph.D., although he was actually the second after Clarence Ellis.
