= Elissa Hallem =

American neurobiologist

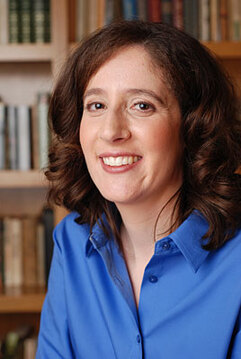
- Photograph of Hallem in 2016
- Education: Williams College (BA); Yale University (PhD)
- Scientific career
- Fields: Neurobiologist
- Institutions: UCLA

Elissa A. Hallem is an American neurobiologist. She won a 2012 MacArthur Fellowship. Hallem is Professor and Vice Chair of Graduate Studies in the Department of Microbiology, Immunology, and Molecular Genetics at UCLA. Her lab focuses on the ability for skin-penetrating nematodes to infect host organisms using their sensory cues.

== Early life and education ==
Elissa Hallem was born in Santa Monica, California, in 1977. In 8th grade she enrolled in a summer program run by the Johns Hopkins University Center for Talented Youth where she followed a course in psychology held at the Loyola Marymount University at Los Angeles. During high school, she worked in a UCLA lab with professor S. Lawrence Zipursky, a family friend.

Hallem graduated from Williams College with a B.A. in biology and chemistry in 1999, and received a Ph.D. from Yale University in 2005. She completed her post-doctoral training at California Institute of Technology in 2010.

== Honors and awards ==
- 2012- MacArthur Fellowship
- 2012- Searle Scholars Program
- 2013- UCLA Dean's Recognition Award
- 2014- NIH Director's New Innovator Award
- 2020- UCLA Faculty Mentor Award
