= Imagine (educational magazine) =

Defunct educational periodical

- Editor: Melissa Hartman
- Categories: Educational periodical
- Publisher: Johns Hopkins University
- First issue: September 1993
- Final issue: June 2018
- Country: USA
- Based in: Baltimore, MD
- Website: Official site Subscription site

Imagine is a defunct educational periodical for 7th-12th graders that was published by the Center for Talented Youth (CTY) at Johns Hopkins University. It is intended to provide intellectual stimulus for students looking toward their college years. Each issue focuses on an academic theme such as engineering, social sciences, archaeology, or robotics, that a younger student might not be exposed to in the course of primary or secondary education. The magazine also features, among other things, student-written articles (making up the bulk of the magazine) about summer and extracurricular activities, reviews of selective colleges, book reviews, interviews with accomplished people, puzzles, college planning advice, and career options information. Contests for Imagine readers were held at times, with topics ranging from essay competitions to photo contests. In 2004, 2005, 2006 and 2007 Imagine was awarded the Parents' Choice Gold Award for magazines. The editor was Melissa Hartman of Johns Hopkins University, CTY.

The magazine was published five times each year, from September 1993 through June 2018. Issues are between 40 and 50 pages in length.

== See also ==
- Gifted education
- Gifted
- U.S. children's magazines
- Center for Talented Youth
