= Rowland, North Carolina =

- Town
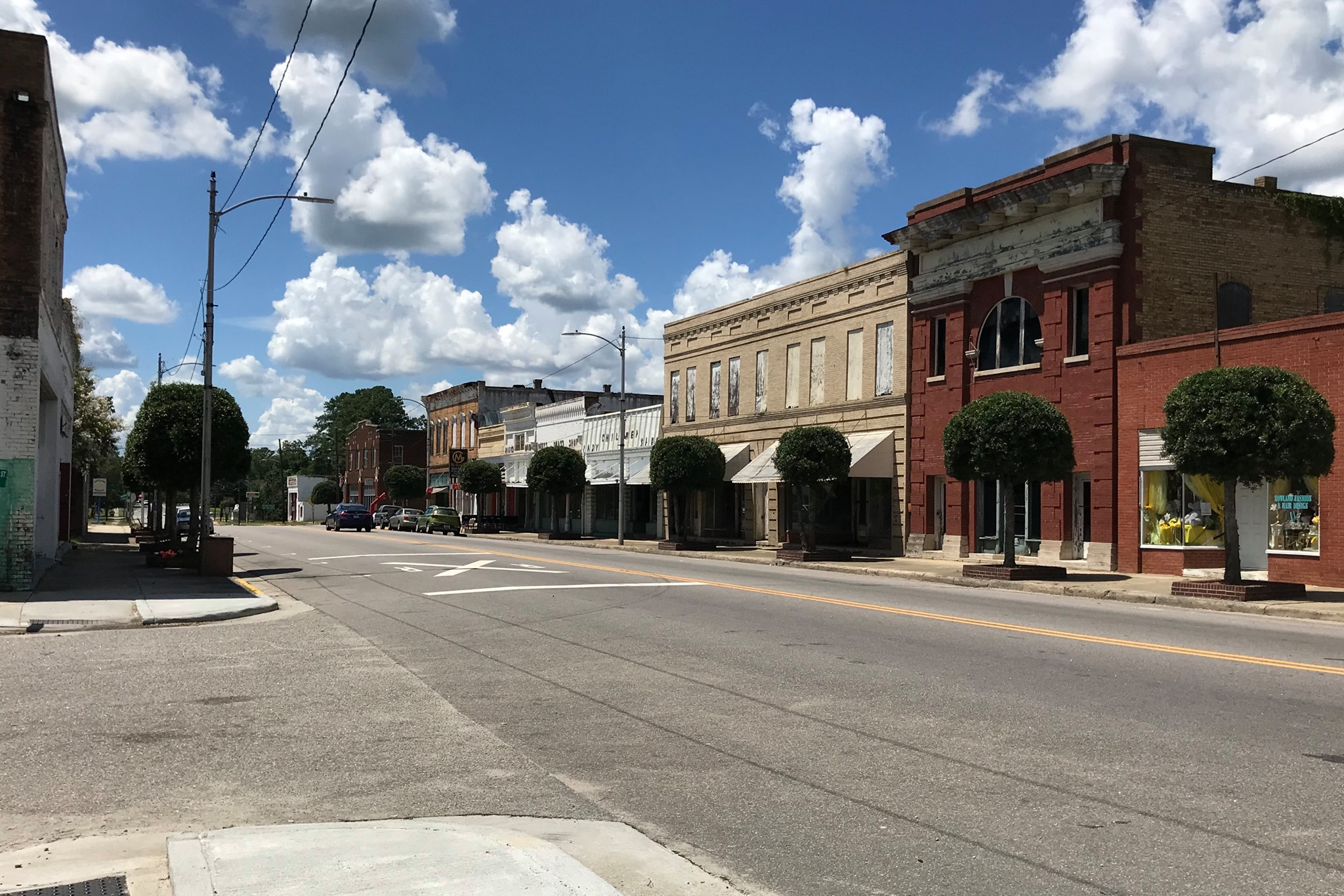
- West Main Street

- Location within the state of North Carolina
- Coordinates: 34°32′10″N 79°17′34″W
- Country: United States
- State: North Carolina
- County: Robeson

Government
  - Mayor: Robert McDougald

Area
  - Total: 1.05 sq mi (2.73 km^{2})
  - Land: 1.05 sq mi (2.73 km^{2})
  - Water: 0 sq mi (0.00 km^{2})
- Elevation: 148 ft (45 m)

Population (2020)
  - Total: 885
  - Density: 841.1/sq mi (324.74/km^{2})
- Time zone: UTC-5 (Eastern (EST))
  - Summer (DST): UTC-4 (EDT)
- ZIP code: 28383
- Area codes: 910, 472
- FIPS code: 37-58140
- GNIS feature ID: 2407252
- Website: https://townofrowlandnc.com/

Rowland is a town in Rowland Township, Robeson County, North Carolina, United States. The population was 885 at the 2020 census.

== History ==
The congregation of the Ashpole Presbyterian Church was founded in the eventual bounds of the community in 1796. Rowland was incorporated in 1889 and named in honor of Alfred Rowland. The first brick building in the town, a hotel and store, was erected in 1892. Rowland served as a key market for regional tobacco production until the sector declined in the 1970s. By the mid-2000s the downtown was in physical decline, though by 2015 work had been done to clean up the main thoroughfare and maintain its buildings. The Ashpole Presbyterian Church, Centenary Methodist Church, Rowland Depot, and Rowland Main Street Historic District are listed on the National Register of Historic Places.

== Geography ==
According to the United States Census Bureau, the town has a total area of 1.1 square miles (2.8 km^{2}), all land.

On Interstate 95, it is one exit north of a roadside attraction called South of the Border.

== Demographics ==
Historical population
Census	Pop.	Note	%±
1890	72		—
1900	357		395.8%
1910	787		120.4%
1920	767		−2.5%
1930	915		19.3%
1940	999		9.2%
1950	1,293		29.4%
1960	1,408		8.9%
1970	1,358		−3.6%
1980	1,841		35.6%
1990	1,139		−38.1%
2000	1,146		0.6%
2010	1,037		−9.5%
2020	885		−14.7%
U.S. Decennial Census

=== Racial and ethnic composition ===
Rowland town, North Carolina – Racial and ethnic composition Note: the US Census treats Hispanic/Latino as an ethnic category. This table excludes Latinos from the racial categories and assigns them to a separate category. Hispanics/Latinos may be of any race.
Race / Ethnicity (NH = Non-Hispanic)	Pop 2000	Pop 2010	Pop 2020	% 2000	% 2010	% 2020
White alone (NH)	306	215	169	26.70%	20.73%	19.10%
Black or African American alone (NH)	777	728	576	67.80%	70.20%	65.08%
Native American or Alaska Native alone (NH)	51	60	77	4.45%	5.79%	8.70%
Asian alone (NH)	0	0	3	0.00%	0.00%	0.34%
Native Hawaiian or Pacific Islander alone (NH)	0	0	1	0.00%	0.00%	0.11%
Other race alone (NH)	0	0	3	0.00%	0.00%	0.34%
Mixed race or Multiracial (NH)	8	17	42	0.70%	1.64%	4.75%
Hispanic or Latino (any race)	4	17	14	0.35%	1.64%	1.58%
Total	1,146	1,037	885	100.00%	100.00%	100.00%

=== 2020 census ===
As of the 2020 United States census, there were 885 people, 441 households, and 244 families residing in the town.

=== 2010 census ===
As of the 2010 United States census, there were 1,037 people living in the town. The racial makeup of the town was 70.2% Black, 20.7% White, 5.8% Native American and 1.6% from two or more races. 1.6% were Hispanic or Latino of any race.

=== 2000 census ===
As of the census of 2000, there were 1,146 people, 487 households, and 302 families living in the town. The population density was 1,079.8 inhabitants per square mile (416.9/km^{2}). There were 542 housing units at an average density of 510.7 per square mile (197.2/km^{2}). The racial makeup of the town was 26.70% White, 67.98% Black, 4.45% Native American, 0.17% from other races, and 0.70% from two or more races. Hispanic or Latino of any race were 0.35% of the population.

There were 487 households, out of which 25.7% had children under the age of 18 living with them, 31.8% were married couples living together, 25.9% had a female householder with no husband present, and 37.8% were non-families. 35.9% of all households were made up of individuals, and 20.1% had someone living alone who was 65 years of age or older. The average household size was 2.35 and the average family size was 3.05.

In the town, the population was spread out, with 26.4% under the age of 18, 6.9% from 18 to 24, 25.0% from 25 to 44, 23.3% from 45 to 64, and 18.4% who were 65 years of age or older. The median age was 38 years. For every 100 females, there were 80.5 males. For every 100 females age 18 and over, there were 69.8 males.

The median income for a household in the town was $18,021, and the median income for a family was $27,679. Males had a median income of $23,571 versus $20,125 for females. The per capita income for the town was $14,411. About 23.1% of families and 31.3% of the population were below the poverty line, including 44.9% of those under age 18 and 35.3% of those age 65 or over.

== See also ==
- Joseph Monroe
- Vonta Leach

== Works cited ==
- Powell, William S. (1976). The North Carolina Gazetteer: A Dictionary of Tar Heel Places. Chapel Hill: The University of North Carolina Press. ISBN 9780807812471.
- Sider, Gerald M. (2015). Race Becomes Tomorrow: North Carolina and the Shadow of Civil Rights. Duke University Press. ISBN 978-0-8223-7504-3.
