= School and College Ability Test =

United States standardised test

The School and College Ability Test (SCAT), is a standardized test conducted in the United States that measures math and verbal reasoning abilities in gifted children.

== About ==
The SCAT is used by the Center for Talented Youth (CTY) as an above-grade-level entrance exam for students in grades 2–8. Students in grades 2-3 take the Elementary SCAT designed for students in grades 4-5. Students in grades 4-5 take the Intermediate SCAT designed for students in grades 6-8. Students in grades 6 and above take the Advanced SCAT designed for students in grades 9-12. There are 55 questions per section, 5 of which are experimental. The percentile ranks for the SCAT have not been updated since 1979. So, when your child takes this test, your child is being compared to a national sample of children who took the test in 1979.

The equivalent test in the UK is the CAT4 test run by GL Assessment and consists of a battery of 4 individual tests; Verbal Reasoning, Non-Verbal Reasoning, Spatial Reasoning, Quantitative Reasoning. CAT4 is used as an admission test and also by schools to determine potential (gifted or weaker children).

== Qualification ==
Anyone who pays for the test may take it; there are no requirements for testing.

== Scoring ==
Scoring is based on a three-step process in which a student’s raw score is scaled based on the test version and then compared to the results of the test scores of normal students in the higher-level grade. However, as these normal students took the test in 1979, percentile rankings may be different when compared to a more recent group of test-takers. The minimum scores required for qualification for the 2nd to 10th grade CTY summer courses are below:

- Grade 2 ≥ 430 SCAT Verbal or 435 SCAT Quantitative
- Grade 3 ≥ 435 SCAT Verbal or 440 SCAT Quantitative
- Grade 4 ≥ 440 SCAT Verbal or 450 SCAT Quantitative
- Grade 5 ≥ 445 SCAT Verbal or 465 SCAT Quantitative
- Grade 6 ≥ 450 SCAT Verbal or 470 SCAT Quantitative
- Grade 7 ≥ 455 SCAT Verbal or 475 SCAT Quantitative
- Grade 8 ≥ 460 SCAT Verbal or 480 SCAT Quantitative
- Grade 9 ≥ 465 SCAT Verbal or 485 SCAT Quantitative
- Grade 10 ≥ 470 SCAT Verbal or 490 SCAT Quantitative
