= Timothy P. McNamara =

Timothy P. McNamara is a psychologist who served as the Searcy Family Dean of the College of Arts and Science at Vanderbilt University from July 1, 2024 to June 30, 2026. He heads the Spatial Memory & Navigation Lab (MemNav Lab) in the Department of Psychology at Vanderbilt University.

== Life ==
McNamara received his B.G.S. from the University of Kansas in 1979 and his Ph.D. in psychology from Yale University in 1984. His Ph.D. advisor was Robert Sternberg. He started his career at Vanderbilt University in 1983. He was promoted to associate professor in 1989 and to Professor in 1995. At Vanderbilt University, McNamara has served as Chair of the Department of Psychology (1996–2004, 2022–2023); Associate and Vice Provost (2004–2015); and Interim Dean of the College of Arts and Science (2023–2024). He has been involved in higher education accreditation, and served on the Board of Trustees of the Southern Association of Colleges and Schools Commission on Colleges from 2014 to 2019.

=== Research ===
McNamara's research investigates human memory, cognition, and decision making, with a particular focus on spatial processing. His research has investigated the metric structure of spatial memory, the spatial reference systems used in memory to represent the locations of objects in the environment, and how people update representations of their own location and orientation during locomotion. McNamara and his colleagues developed the Principal Reference Theory of spatial memory. This theory posits that learning a new environment involves selecting a preferred, or “principal”, reference direction. Locations, distances, and directions are represented in memory terms of this principal reference direction. When a person or animal later recalls or makes judgments about the space, performance is fastest and most accurate when adopting this perspective. Recent studies have examined how people use spatial cues to location and orientation (e.g., landmarks in the environment and body-based cues, such as vestibular, proprioceptive, and efference-copy information) during navigation to estimate their positions and the locations of goals. These studies have used statistical decision theory as a theoretical framework for examining the complex sensory-perceptual and decision processes involved in navigation.

== Awards and honors ==
- 1986–1988 National Academy of Education Spencer Fellow
- 1994 Elected Fellow of American Psychological Association, Division 3
- 1999 Elected Fellow of American Association for the Advancement of Science
- 2003 Elected Fellow of Association for Psychological Science
- 2019 Thomas Jefferson Award, Vanderbilt University
- 2022 Gertrude Conaway Vanderbilt Chair in the Social and Natural Sciences, Vanderbilt University

== Selected works ==
- McNamara, T. P. (1986). Mental representations of spatial relations. Cognitive Psychology, 18(1), 87–121.
- Shelton, A. L., & McNamara, T. P. (2001). Systems of spatial reference in human memory. Cognitive Psychology, 43, 274–310.
- Mou, W., & McNamara, T. P. (2002). Intrinsic frames of reference in spatial memory. Journal of Experimental Psychology: Learning, Memory, and Cognition, 28, 162–17.
- Mou, W., McNamara, T. P., Valiquette, C. M., & Rump, B. (2004). Allocentric and egocentric updating of spatial memories. Journal of Experimental Psychology: Learning, Memory, and Cognition, 30, 142–157.
- McNamara, T. P. (2005). Semantic priming: perspectives from memory and word recognition. New York: Psychology Press.
- Kelly, J. W., McNamara, T. P., Bodenheimer, B., Carr, T. H., & Rieser, J. J. (2008). The shape of human navigation: How environmental geometry is used in the maintenance of spatial orientation. Cognition, 109, 281–286.
- Chen, X., He, Q., Kelly, J. W., Fiete, I. R., & McNamara, T. P. (2015). Bias in human path integration is predicted by properties of grid cells. Current Biology, 25 (13), 1771–6.
- Chen, X., McNamara, T. P., Kelly, J. W., & Wolbers, T. (2017). Cue combination in human spatial navigation. Cognitive Psychology, 95, 105–144.
- He, Q., McNamara, T. P., Bodenheimer, B., & Klippel, A. (2019). Acquisition and transfer of spatial knowledge during wayfinding. Journal of Experimental Psychology: Learning, Memory, and Cognition, 45(8), 1364–1386.
- McNamara, T. P., & Chen, X. (2022). Bayesian decision theory and navigation. Psychonomic Bulletin & Review, 29, 721–752.
