= Center for Talented Youth =

Gifted education program

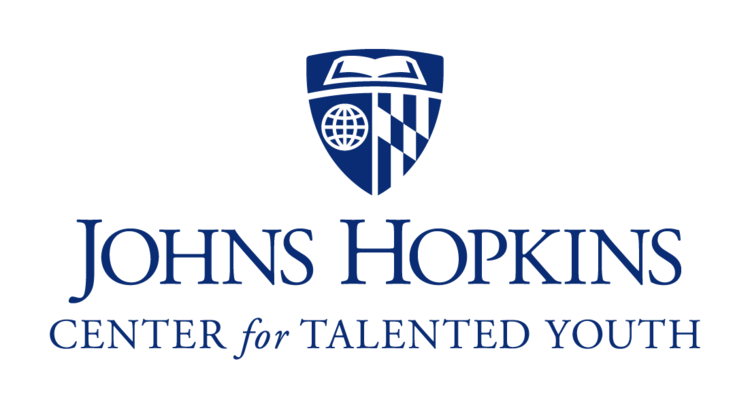

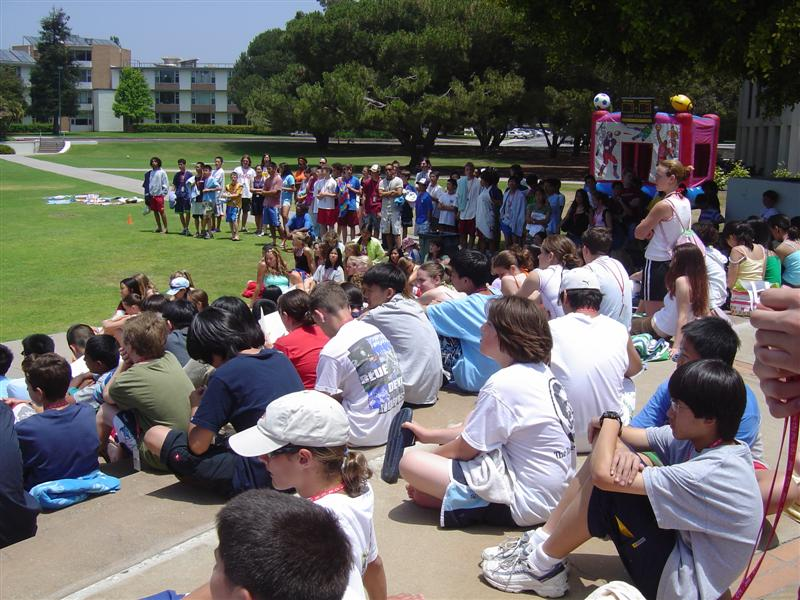
- A CTY afternoon activity at LMU in Los Angeles

Information
- School type: gifted education
- Founded: 1979; 47 years ago
- Founder: Julian Stanley
- Authority: Johns Hopkins University
- Director: Amy Shelton
- Age: 6 to 17
- Enrollment: 10,000+
- Classes offered: Mathematics, computer science, humanities, and science
- Accreditation: grades K–12
- Website: cty.jhu.edu

The Johns Hopkins Center for Talented Youth (CTY) is a gifted education program for school-age children founded in 1979 by psychologist Julian Stanley at Johns Hopkins University. It was established as a research study into how academically advanced children learn and became the first program to identify academically talented students through above-grade-level testing and provide them with challenging learning opportunities.

CTY offers summer, online, and family programs to students from around the world and has nearly 30,000 program enrollments annually. CTY is accredited for students in grades K to 12 by the Middle States Association of Colleges and Schools.

CTY published the Imagine magazine that provided educational opportunities and resources and student-written content for middle and high school students. The magazine was discontinued in June 2018.

== History ==
=== Background ===
Julian Stanley, a psychology professor at Johns Hopkins University, launched the initial talent search in 1972, aiming to discover and support intellectually gifted students. Initially named SMPY (The Study of Mathematically Precocious Youth), the program primarily focused on nurturing mathematical aptitude. In 1980, the CTY Summer Programs officially commenced, offering educational opportunities during the summer at St. Mary's College of Maryland.

=== Beginnings ===
The Center for Talented Youth (CTY) traces its origins back to the Office of Talent Identification and Development (OTID), which marked the early stages of the organization. OTID emerged through the merger of Stanley's Study for Mathematically Precocious Youth (SMPY) and the Program for Verbally Gifted Youth (PVGY). Subsequently, the program was renamed the Center for the Advancement of Academically Advanced Youth (CTY). Initially, William C. George served as the first director of the integrated program, a position later assumed by William Durden in 1982. In the beginning, the residential program was established in St. Mary's, with 109 students participating in its inaugural year. However, in 1980, CTY expanded its reach by initiating a talent search across the United States to identify gifted students. While the program at St. Mary's concluded by the end of the 1981 summer, CTY's growth was propelled by two locations: Carlisle and Lancaster, which played a significant role in shaping the organization's present-day stature.

=== Growth of organization ===
In the summer of 1982, Carlisle and Lancaster took over the operations previously held at St. Mary's and have continued to run their programs ever since. The partnership between Franklin & Marshall and Dickinson College played a crucial role in popularizing CTY. In 1986, Saratoga Springs became another location, further expanding the summer camp. CTY introduced a commuter program for young students in 1985, followed by the addition of a residential Young Students program in 1992, which included sites like Sandy Spring. Los Angeles also joined the CTY network in 1992, contributing to the organization's growing number of sites and enrolled students. In the same year, the Centre for Talented Youth in Ireland was established in Dublin. By 1992, CTY had approximately 6,000 students enrolled in summer programs across 12 sites in the United States and abroad. With CTY's expanding presence, the organization recognized the need to create a comprehensive name for their institution, giving rise to IAAY, the Institute for the Academic Advancement of Youth.

=== IAAY and the start of CAA ===
On July 1, 1995, the organization adopted the name IAAY (Institute for the Academic Advancement of Youth). Durden, the former executive director, expressed that this change would enable the organization to better address the challenges of talent advancement in the 21st century and work more effectively with individual students. Under Durden's leadership, IAAY introduced the Center for Academic Advancement (now known as the Center for Academic Explorations) to increase flexibility and accommodate students who narrowly missed the test score requirements of CTY. This expansion allowed more students to participate in CTY programs while still benefiting from engaging and accelerated learning. The CAA program was launched in Bethlehem and Frederick in the summer of 1996 and expanded to include additional sites in Santa Cruz and the Marine Site at the University of Notre Dame - Maryland. By 1998, the total number of CAA sites reached 16. As the organization approached the turn of the century, they recognized that the name "Center for Talented Youth" better reflected their mission, leading to the official change back to CTY on January 1, 2000.

=== Trials and tribulations in the early 21st century ===
After reverting to the name Center for Talented Youth, the organization embarked on a period of expansion by adding more sites and programs. In 2000, Alexandria for Young Students was introduced, followed by Bristol in 2001 as part of the Center for Academic Advancement. In 2002, the Civic Leadership Institute was established at the Peabody Institute in Baltimore, Maryland. CTY expanded to Tempe, Arizona, and Kaneohe, Hawaii, aiming to broaden its reach. However, these projects had a short lifespan, as the Arizona site closed in 2005 and the Hawaii site closed in 2009, despite its popularity in the later years. The organization also ventured into the international arena, launching two international branches in 2007: Nanjing, China, held at the Hopkins-Nanjing Center, and Puebla, Mexico, at the Universidad de las Americas. The programs, particularly the one in Nanjing, were well received, leading CTY to establish an additional site in Madrid, Spain. The Center faced challenges during the 2008 recession, resulting in the closure of several sites between 2008 and 2010, including Loudonville, Puebla, Madrid, San Francisco, Kaneohe, Monterrey, and Nanjing, marking a difficult period for CTY. However, the organization persevered in its mission to provide accelerated learning opportunities worldwide. In 2010, Lea Ybarra stepped down as site director, and on August 1, 2011, Elaine Tuttle Hansen assumed the position. Although CTY discontinued its international sites, it began the process anew with the establishment of the Hong Kong site.

=== 2011–2021 ===
As of 2016, over 1.5 million students had participated in CTY's Talent Search. In 2016, over 28,000 students participated in CTY programs. Summer Programs were over 9,000 and CTY Online had over 13,000 enrollments. In 2016, CTY had summer programs running at 21 different sites, along with two international sites in Hong Kong and Anatolia, Greece. In 2018, CTY had instituted a new program to be at Yale University entitled the Institute for Advanced Cultural and Critical Studies.

=== 2022 partial collapse ===
In 2022, about one-third of CTY's summer sessions were canceled at the last minute—when some students were reportedly already en route to the CTY sites—due to a lack of staffing and staff background checks not clearing in time. Subsequently, Johns Hopkins provost Sunil Kumar removed executive director Virginia Roach and replaced her with Stephen Gange, a professor and executive vice provost for academic affairs. Kumar also promised an investigation into the incident, described by the Washington Post as a "partial collapse". An open letter from CTY staff to the community described several organizational reasons for the lack of staffing, including the program's failure to obtain state-mandated security clearances for staff, inadequate COVID testing and monitoring policies, and a stated plan to dismiss without pay any staff who contracted COVID. Affected students found an outlet for their outrage on Facebook, where they called CTY the "Fyre Festival of Nerd Camps".

Amy Shelton became executive director of CTY in October 2022.

== Admission requirements ==
CTY first requires students to sign up for an account and membership, which costs $50 for U.S. students and $60 for international students. They must then submit scores from a qualifying test to determine if they are at "Advanced CTY-Level" (defined as showing ability four grade levels above current enrolled grade) or "CTY-Level" (defined as showing ability two grade levels above current enrolled grade). These scores would then "qualify" them for CTY courses at the level achieved. Eligible test scores include the SCAT, PSAT, SAT, ACT, and STB (Spatial Test Battery). Students receive their course eligibility results online.

== Tuition and financial aid ==
In 2024, On-Campus Summer Programs ranged in tuition from $3,099 to $6,819 (USD). In the 2023-24 School Year, online and synchronous, or "LIVE" courses, cost $1,125, asynchronous courses cost $955-$1,455, session-based courses cost $695-$2,130, and clubs cost $185-$380.

Full-time JHU staff can apply for 50% tuition remission.

Families are allowed to apply for financial aid if their child is a United States citizen, an eligible permanent U.S. resident with a green card, or permanently resides in the United States. Families must also not owe any tuition or fees from a previous year's CTY program.

== Sites ==
Location	Institution	Opened	Students
Lancaster, Pennsylvania	Franklin & Marshall College	1982	320
Carlisle, Pennsylvania	Dickinson College	1982	340
Baltimore, Maryland	Johns Hopkins University	1991	240
Saratoga Springs, New York	Skidmore College	1986	220
Los Angeles, California	Loyola Marymount University	1992	280
Bristol, Rhode Island	Roger Williams University	2001	250
Seattle, Washington	Seattle University	2012	220
Princeton, New Jersey	Princeton University	2006	200
Haverford, Pennsylvania	Haverford College	2013	260
Berkeley, California	University of California, Berkeley	2010	100
Hong Kong	University of Hong Kong	2013	200
Collegeville, Pennsylvania	Ursinus College	2018	180
Dublin, Ireland	Dublin City University	1992	250
Thessaloniki, Greece	Anatolia College	2014	100

== Reception ==
Former CTY executive director Elaine Tuttle Hansen (2011–2018) was interviewed by National Public Radio and published on the Opinion-Editorial pages of The Chronicle of Higher Education, The New York Times, and The Baltimore Sun.

In July 2004, CTY was featured in an article in The New Yorker.

In 2006, the camp was shown in an hour-long CNN special on gifted children.

== Notable alumni ==
Notable CTY alumni include:

- Six of 32 American recipients of the 2006 Rhodes Scholarship
- Lady Gaga, musician, actress
- Sergey Brin, co-founder of Google
- George Hotz, hacker and founder of comma.ai
- Hollis Robbins, academic and essayist
- Evanna Lynch, who portrays Luna Lovegood in the Harry Potter movies, attended the Irish Centre For Talented Youth in Dublin
- Gary Marcus, a research psychologist and the author of Kluge
- Mark Zuckerberg, founder of Facebook and Time Person of the Year 2010
- Terence Tao, 2006 Fields Medal recipient
- Christopher Williams, medical physicist and NASA astronaut
- Elissa Hallem, 2012 MacArthur Fellows Program (Genius Grant) for neurobiology
- Jacob Lurie, 2014 MacArthur Fellows Program (Genius Grant) for mathematics
- Dave Aitel, computer security professional
- Ronan Farrow, journalist, lawyer, and former government advisor
- Andrew Yang, Democratic candidate for 2021 New York City Mayor election
- Marques Brownlee, YouTube technology reviewer
- Erez Lieberman-Aiden, geneticist
- Curtis Yarvin, blogger also known by the pen name Mencius Moldbug
- William Dichtel, 2015 MacArthur Fellows Program for chemistry

== See also ==
- Centre for the Talented Youth of Ireland
- Gifted
- Gifted Education
- Imagine Magazine
- Johns Hopkins University
- Dr. Julian Stanley
