= MS Australia =

Australian non-profit organization

Multiple Sclerosis Australia, commonly referred to as MS Australia, is a national non-profit organization which conducts research and advocacy in support of individuals affected by Multiple Sclerosis (MS). MS Australia was registered as a charitable entity in Australia in the year 1975. As of July 2021, there were over 25,000 people living with multiple sclerosis in Australia and MS Australia assists Australians living with or otherwise affected by MS.

The organisation characterises its approach as one that leverages Australia's unique strengths within the broader global landscape of Multiple Sclerosis (MS) research. MS Australia says that it is committed to fostering the Australian MS research network while actively pursuing several overarching research objectives. These research objectives encompass:

- Enhancing Diagnosis and Treatment: A fundamental goal is to improve the understanding of MS, with a particular emphasis on refining diagnostic methods and treatment options. This includes not only the management of symptoms but also the promotion of rehabilitation strategies to enhance the quality of life for those affected by MS.
- Prediction and Prevention: MS Australia is dedicated to the pursuit of knowledge regarding the prediction and prevention of MS. This entails investigating the factors contributing to the onset of the condition and exploring strategies to mitigate its development.
- Cell Repair and Regeneration: Another critical aspect of their research efforts involves the development of innovative approaches to foster cell repair and regeneration within the context of MS. This encompasses investigations into therapies and interventions that hold the potential to restore damaged neural tissue and enhance the long-term well-being of individuals living with MS.

MS Australia encourages a national collaborative effort into MS research. The organisation seeks to enable researchers to make discoveries not possible when working alone by inviting individual research teams to apply for support while also supporting major platform' projects. There are numerous instances of MS Australia providing research grants to individual researchers or research teams.

== Founding ==
MS Australia was first established as the Australian MS Society in 1956, with the first general meeting held in February 1957. Nine years earlier, in 1947, American Sylvia Lawry founded the National Multiple Sclerosis Society in New York, and co-founded the Multiple Sclerosis International Federation the same year. Soon after followed the establishment of the Multiple Sclerosis Society of Canada in 1948 and the Multiple Sclerosis Society of Great Britain in 1953. The Australian MS Society was therefore the fourth society globally to be established for multiple sclerosis support and advocacy.

== Activities ==
=== Research ===
In 2004, MS Australia established a subsidiary research branch called MS Research Australia. In June 2020, MS Research Australia was integrated into MS Australia as a fully integrated organisation under one CEO and Board.

MS Australia states that the organisation's medium to long term strategy focuses on funding research to better understand the biological basis of MS to prevent the disease from being triggered and causing further damage. Simultaneously, this research investigates how existing damage can be repaired to reverse disability.

MS Australia’s short-term strategy focuses on clinical research to measure the benefits of seeking alternative ways to manage MS symptoms. The Australian MS Longitudinal Study (AMSLS) measures the physical, social and economic impact of MS on Australians for advocacy and service development purposes.

MS Australia currently approaches these strategies through several branches:

- MS Australia Gene Bank and ANZgene Consortium.
- MS Research Australia Brain Bank.
- MS Research Australia Clinical Trials Network.
- Australian MS Longitudinal Study (AMSLS).
- Proteomics Collaboration.
- PrevANZ – Vitamin D MS prevention trial.

=== Research Achievements ===
MS Australia claims to have achieved the following through its funding and research efforts:

- 26 new research methods.
- 7 new clinical blood tests.
- 2 new clinical assessment tools.
- 18 grants contributed to biobanks.
- 5 new mouse models.
- 5 new biomarkers in development.
- Creation of key registries through seven separate funding grants.
- Supported research contributing to 5 patents.
- Discovery of a blood test developed by Macquarie University researchers to distinguish between relapsing and progressive forms of MS.
- Increased expressions of interest and confirmed donation pledges to the MS Research Australia Brain bank.
- Successful completion of an important milestone agreement between MS Research Australia, MS Queensland and QIMR to work collaboratively on a phase 1 clinical trial for the Epstein Barr Virus for a potential new therapy for progressive MS.
- Selected as one of four high-impact charities to receive The Sohn Hearts and Minds funding.
- Collaboration with the Macquarie Group Foundation to fund clinical research.
- Support of the Ausimmune study.
- Produced the 2011 Economic Impact of MS in the Australia report, which provides vital data in support of funding applications to leverage further targeted funds for MS research.

== Advocacy ==
MS Australia describes their advocacy role for the MS community within Australia as comprising three levels:

- Individual. Local-level focus on helping and supporting individual people living with or affected by MS, which may include informal or structured advocacy.
- Systemic. Focused on promoting and actively lobbying for systemic changes to legislation, government and service provider policies, and community attitudes to improve the general situation of people living with MS around Australia.
- Collaborative. This level of advocacy recognises that there are common issues experienced by many people living with disability or disease, and focuses on supporting and cooperating with other representative bodies nationally and internationally.

== Role in the National MS Community ==
MS Australia works with state MS bodies, connecting MS community members (including those living with the disease, family, friends, and carers) with support, information, and community. The organisation also advocates for these state bodies in communities and with the federal government.

There are four state MS bodies:

- MS Limited: Australian Capital Territory, New South Wales, Victoria, and Tasmania
- MS Queensland: Queensland
- MS Society SA/NT: South Australia and the Northern Territory
- MSWA: Western Australia

MS Australia is also a partner of several Australian support and advocacy groups, such as Rare Voices Australia (RVA), a body which promotes the creation of an Australian National Rare Disease Plan.

== Alliances ==
MS Australia has close relationships with numerous community representative groups to build awareness of key issues for people with MS. MS Australia is a member of the following alliances:

- Neurological Alliance Australia (NAA)
- Australian Patient Advocacy Alliance (APAA)
- Accessible Product Design Alliance
- Assistive Technology for All Alliance (ATFA)
- Chronic Illness Alliance
- Ending Loneliness Together
- Stem Cells Australia
- International Progressive MS Alliance

=== Submissions ===
MS Australia regularly seeks opportunities to contribute to policy development and government reviews by submitting proposals to the Australian government. These submissions range from those which propose a re-evaluation of cannabinoids by the Therapeutic Goods Administration to facilitate cannabinoid usage for people suffering from MS, to providing information for the National Disability Employment Strategy about key areas affecting people with MS.

== Role in the Global MS Community ==
MS Australia is involved with numerous international MS organizations. These include:

=== Multiple Sclerosis International Federation (MSIF) ===
The Multiple Sclerosis International Federation comprises 48 MS societies worldwide, including MS Australia. Several MS Australia executive staff hold significant positions on the MSIF Board and fulfill MSIF committee roles.

MS Australia participates annually in World MS Day, which occurs on 30 May and is led by MSIF. Associated activities occur throughout May and early June and are designed to bring the global MS community together to raise awareness of the disease and campaign with all those affected by MS.

=== International Progressive MS Alliance ===
MS Australia is a managing member of the Alliance. Key staff are representatives on a variety of committees including the Executive Committee which is responsible for the oversight, strategic intent, and governance of the global collaborative, the Scientific Steering Committee, and the Fundraising and Communications committee.

=== The International MS Genetics Consortium ===
Source:

=== MS Brain Health ===
MS Brain Health is an initiative calling for a radical change in the management of MS based on a 2015 report that discusses diagnosis, therapeutic strategies and improving access to treatment in MS. MS Australia keenly endorses this initiative, and several key MS Australia personnel are directly involved with supporting the MS Brain Health global initiative.
