= List of multiple sclerosis organizations =

List of multiple sclerosis organizations in different countries around the world.

== International ==
Scientific and research organization:

- European Committee for Treatment and Research in Multiple Sclerosis (ECTRIMS)

Patient Advocacy Organization:

- Multiple Sclerosis International Federation
- European Multiple Sclerosis Platform (EMSP)

== Australasia ==
=== Australia ===
- MS Research Australia

== Europe ==
- European Committee for Treatment and Research in Multiple Sclerosis (ECTRIMS)

=== United Kingdom ===
- Multiple Sclerosis Society of Great Britain
- Multiple Sclerosis Trust

=== The Netherlands & Belgium ===
External links:

- Nationaal MS Fonds
- MS Vereniging Nederland
- Nationale Belgische Multiple Sclerose Liga

== North America ==
=== Canada ===
- Multiple Sclerosis Society of Canada

=== United States ===
- Fly for MS
- Multiple Sclerosis Foundation
- Myelin Repair Foundation
- National Multiple Sclerosis Society
