= Evanna Lynch =

Irish actress and activist (born 1991)

- Lynch in 2026
- Born: 16 August 1991 (age 35); Termonfeckin, County Louth, Ireland
- Education: Our Lady's College, Greenhills, Drogheda; Centre for Talented Youth; Institute of Education
- Occupations: Actress; activist
- Years active: 2006–present
- Spouse: Denis Skinner (m. 2026)
- Relatives: Declan Kiberd (uncle); Damien Kiberd (uncle)

Evanna Lynch (born 16 August 1991) is an Irish actress and activist. Lynch made her film debut as Luna Lovegood in Harry Potter and the Order of the Phoenix (2007), reprising her role in successive sequels to critical praise, concluding with Harry Potter and the Deathly Hallows – Part 2 (2011) and series parody A Very Potter Senior Year (2012).

Following her success in Harry Potter, Lynch appeared in G.B.F. (2013), which premiered at the Tribeca Film Festival to positive reviews. She made her stage debut in Houdini as Bess Houdini, which toured the UK in 2013. Lynch starred in the indie drama My Name Is Emily, which premiered at the 2015 Galway Film Fleadh to critical acclaim. In 2017, Lynch starred in a revival of Disco Pigs at the Trafalgar Theatre in London. In 2018, she competed on season 27 of Dancing with the Stars, placing third. She went on to star in the British stage adaptation of The Omission of the Family Coleman at the Theatre Royal, Bath in 2019.

As an activist, Lynch advocates for veganism and animal rights. She has been involved with several non-profit organisations and launched both a vegan-themed podcast and the cruelty-free cosmetics brand Kinder Beauty Box.

== Early life and education ==
Evanna Lynch was born on 16 August 1991 to Marguerite and Donal Lynch of Termonfeckin, County Louth, Ireland. She has two older sisters and a younger brother. Her maternal uncle is Declan Kiberd, a scholar of Irish literature who is a professor at the University of Notre Dame. Lynch was raised a Catholic.

Lynch read the Harry Potter series for the first time at age eight and became a fan, reading and writing fan fiction about the series and sending letters to the author, J. K. Rowling. She was educated at Cartown National School in Termonfeckin until June 2004 and then moved to Our Lady's College in Drogheda, where her father was the deputy principal. In 2008, she studied speculative fiction and drama at the Centre for the Talented Youth of Ireland, a summer school for gifted teens, in Glasnevin. While on the Harry Potter film set, Lynch was tutored for at least three hours a day. In September 2010, she attended the Institute of Education to repeat her Leaving Certificate.

Lynch developed an eating disorder at age eleven. She was hospitalised several times for anorexia, and stated that the Harry Potter novels were the only thing that could distract from her condition. During this period, she often wrote to Rowling, stating that "her books and her kindness really made me want to live again." Rowling wrote then-11-year-old Lynch "incredible, wise letters" back. During the release of the fifth book Order of the Phoenix in June 2003, Lynch was hospitalised and was allowed to leave for an hour to collect a signed copy of the book.

== Career ==
=== 2006–2011: Beginnings and Harry Potter series ===
In January 2006, Lynch auditioned at a casting call in London for the role of Luna Lovegood in Harry Potter and the Order of the Phoenix, the fifth film in the series adapted from the books. After auditioning against 15,000 other girls, and a subsequent screen test with lead actor Daniel Radcliffe, she was cast at age 14. Producers were impressed with her affinity for the character; David Heyman said: "The others could play Luna; Evanna Lynch is Luna." Although uninvolved in the casting process, Rowling believed that Lynch was perfect for the role. She had never acted professionally before the Harry Potter series, her experience having been limited to school plays. While filming Harry Potter, Lynch also made and helped design a number of fashion accessories for her character.

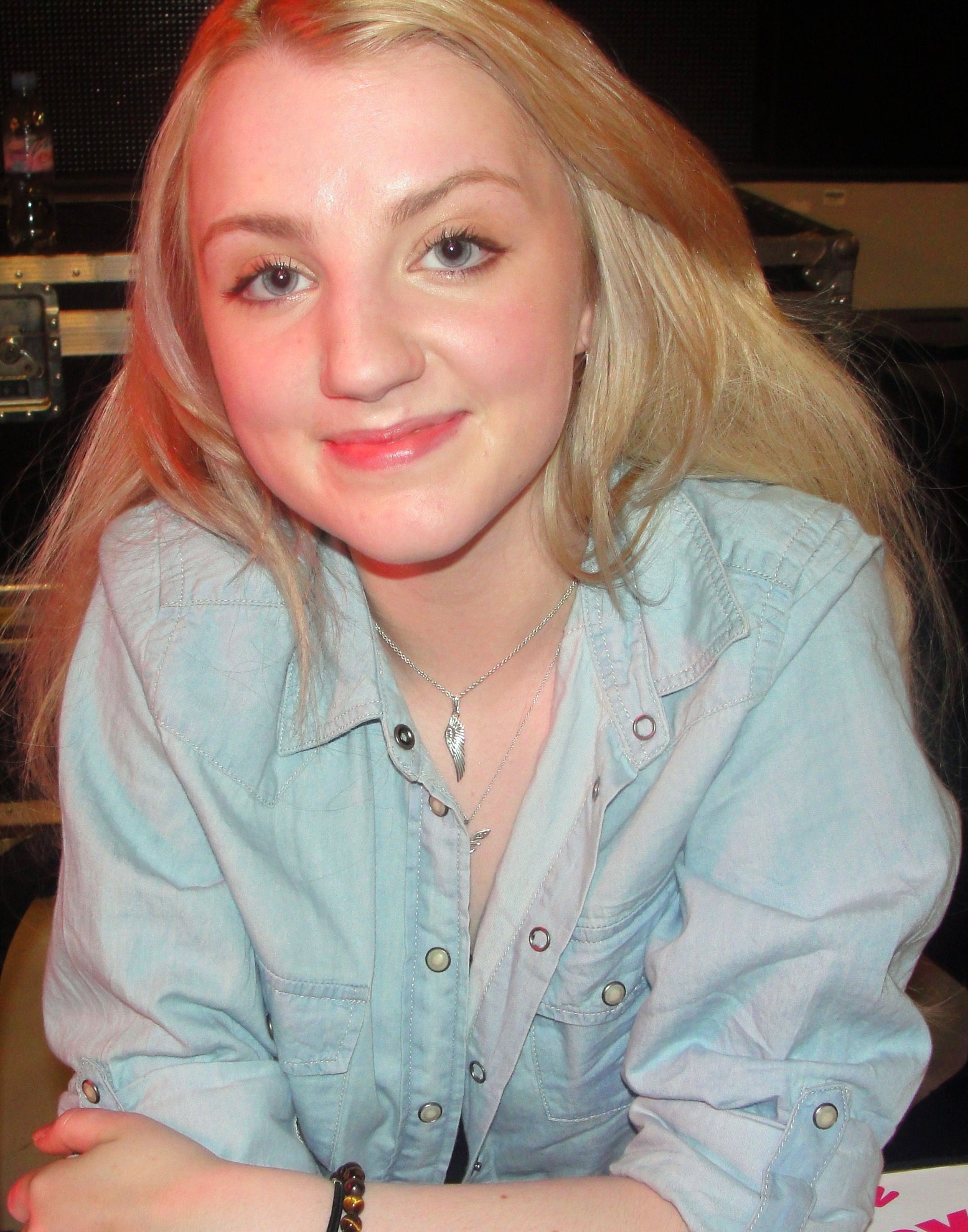
Lynch posing for a photograph at a Half-Blood Prince DVD signing in London in December 2009

Harry Potter and the Order of the Phoenix was Lynch's debut screen performance in 2007. The film was a box office hit and garnered favourable reviews. Critics praised the performances of the supporting cast; Lynch was often singled out for acclaim: The New York Times called her performance "spellbinding", and Jane Watkins of Country Life said she "[brought] an appealing sweetness to her character that's not so developed in the book". She also voiced the character in the film's tie-in video game. Lynch reprised her role in Harry Potter and the Half-Blood Prince (2009). The film was critically and commercially successful. Wesley Morris of The Boston Globe wrote that Lynch "combats the movie's occasional sluggishness with a hilarious sluggishness of her own", and Michael Dwyer of The Irish Times called her the best Irish actress of 2009 for her work on the film. Her performance earned her Scream Award and Young Artist Award nominations, and she returned in the film's tie-in video game.

Lynch in 2011

Harry Potter and the Deathly Hallows – Part 1 was released in 2010 to positive reviews and box office success. The Boston Herald commented that Lynch "is still delightfully lunar," while Quickflix criticised the film, noting that "the delightful Evanna Lynch is brutally underutilised". She reprised her role in the film's tie-in video game. Lynch appeared in the role for the final time in Harry Potter and the Deathly Hallows – Part 2. The film opened to critical acclaim and went on to become the fifth highest-grossing film of all time. The Seattle Times wrote that Lynch "continues to be all-that-and-a-radish-earring as the ever-wafting Luna Lovegood," and Orlando Sentinel named her as "maybe" one of his "favourite players in the finale." She again reprised her role in the film's tie-in video game. In August 2012 at Leakycon in Chicago she joined the cast of StarKid to play Luna Lovegood in a script reading of the third Harry Potter parody musical, A Very Potter Senior Year (the other two being A Very Potter Musical and A Very Potter Sequel).

Harry Potter author J. K. Rowling has maintained that, of all the actors in the film series, Lynch had the most influence on how the respective character was subsequently written; in 2012, she told Charlie Rose that when writing the final books, "I saw her. [She] got in my head. I even heard her voice when I was writing Luna."

=== 2012–2021: Further film and stage performances ===
Lynch went on to guest star as Princess Alehna in the first season finale of the Sky1 television series Sinbad. She was cast in the 2013 indie crime drama film Monster Butler, based on the life of British serial killer and thief Archibald Hall. The film was cancelled due to funding issues. Lynch starred in indie teen comedy G.B.F., which screened at the Tribeca Film Festival in New York City in April 2013 and at the Frameline Film Festival in San Francisco on 30 June 2013. It received positive reviews.

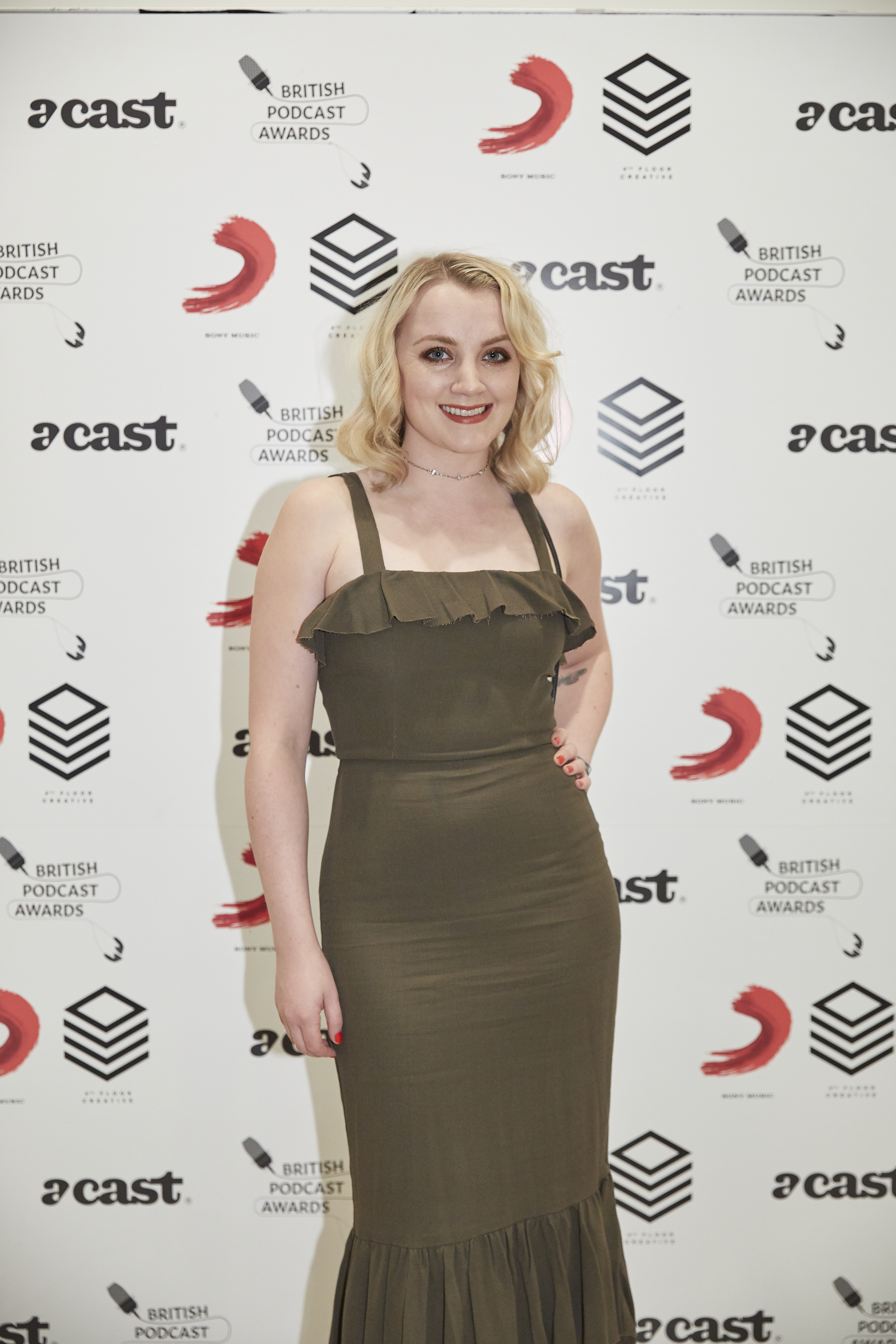
Lynch at the British Podcast Awards in 2018

In May 2013, it was announced that Lynch was to star in the British stage production of Houdini, which toured the U.K from September to October 2013; Lynch portrayed Bess Houdini, the wife and assistant of magician Harry Houdini. Lynch appeared alongside Harry Potter co-stars James and Oliver Phelps in Danny and the Human Zoo, released on BBC One in August 2015. Lynch starred as the titular character in the Irish independent drama My Name Is Emily, written and directed by Simon Fitzmaurice. The film premiered at the 2015 Galway Film Fleadh and garnered favourable reviews; the Galway Advertiser referred to Lynch's attributed her performance to "a lightness and ethereal quality" while remaining a "commanding lead, showing ... pain with a subtlety beyond her years." Lynch was nominated for Best Actress at the Irish Film and Drama Awards for her performance.

From July to August 2017, Lynch starred in a revival of Enda Walsh's Disco Pigs at Trafalgar Theatre. In November 2017, it was reported that she would star in the independent drama Indigo Valley, directed by Jaclyn Bethany, but was forced to drop out of the project due to scheduling conflicts and was replaced with Rosie Day. Lynch appeared in a cameo role in Jason Mewes' directorial debut Madness in the Method (2019). On 12 September 2018, Lynch was announced as one of the celebrities to compete on season 27 of ABC's Dancing with the Stars. Her professional partner was Keo Motsepe. Motsepe and Lynch made it to the show's finale, finishing in third place.

Lynch at Comic-Con Germany in 2021

In March 2019, it was announced she would appear in the British premiere of the Argentinian play The Omission of the Family Coleman, written by Claudio Tolcachir. It premiered at the Ustinov Studio in Bath, UK and ran from March to April 2019. In July 2019, Lynch stated that she will star in the vegan-themed short film entitled You Eat Other Animals? late that year. Lynch lent her voice to Nickelodeon productions Middle School Moguls in 2019 and Rise of the Teenage Mutant Ninja Turtles in 2020. Lynch narrated the story The Fountain of Fair Fortune from the audiobook adaptation of The Tales of Beedle the Bard, an in-universe book of Wizarding World children's stories written by Rowling. Along with her Harry Potter costars Bonnie Wright, Devon Murray, and Mark Williams, Lynch attended the 2021 Comic Con Stuttgart, where the four of them did met-and-greets with fans. Lynch was also present at the 2021 Comic Con Brussels.

After co-hosting the BBC Sounds official companion podcast for Normal People in 2020, she went on to work with two of its stars, India Mullen (Peggy) and Éanna Hardwicke (Rob), on Personal Space, a radio play for RTÉ Radio 1 in 2021.

Lynch at Comic Con Brussels in 2021

While guesting on the Talking Tastebuds podcast in 2020, Lynch reflected on her career.

=== 2022–present: Recent and forthcoming projects ===
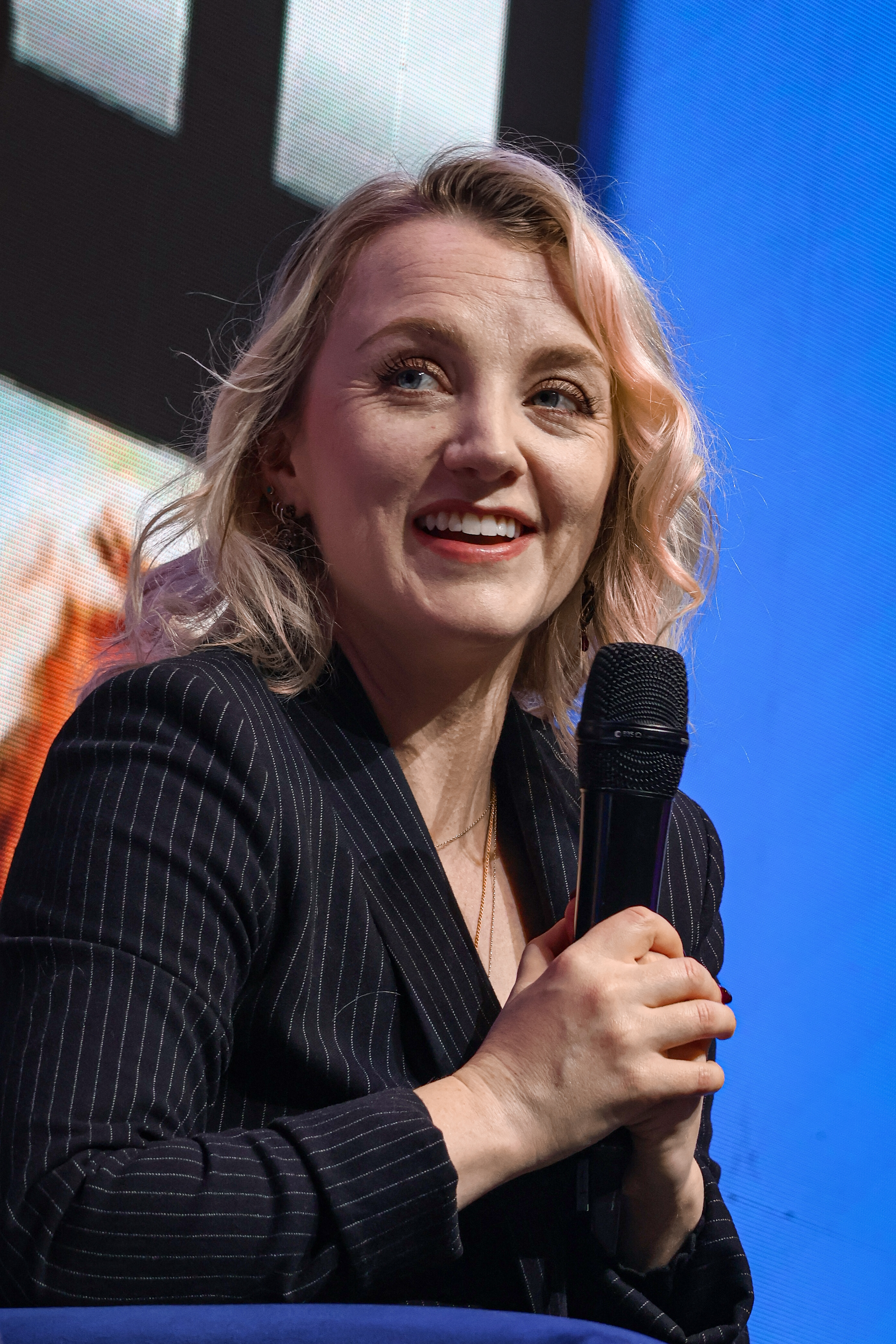
Lynch at Comic Con Cape Town in 2026

In 2022, Lynch launched a podcast called Just Beings with psychologist Melanie Joy.

In 2023, Lynch was cast to play Lucia Joyce in the film James and Lucia, a project by Robert Mullan about writer James Joyce and his daughter Lucia. The movie was originally planned to film in 2018 with Aidan Gillen as James. At the time of Lynch's casting, it was also announced that Rupert Friend had replaced Gillen. Lynch had previously performed the role of Lucia Joyce in both a short film and a rehearsed stage reading, and in a 2018 interview, she had characterized Lucia as "the only person I've connected to deeply in reading over the last few years."

Her next lead role was set for the satirical film Influenced!, a modern take on Oscar Wilde's The Picture of Dorian Gray which was also announced in 2023. However, both films remained stalled following their casting announcements, with the James and Lucia project ultimately collapsing after Mullan's death in 2024.

Lynch voiced the lead character in the 2024 animated film My Freaky Family (working title Being Betty Flood). Also in 2024, she provided voiceover for Mercy for Animals' Voices of Hope ~ Words of Wisdom by Dr. Jane Goodall.

In 2026, Lynch joined the cast of the Disney XD animated series Dragon Striker as the voice of Ameline, marking her first time working on a Disney property.

== Other ventures ==
=== Charity work ===
Lynch has participated in charity work, including with the Multiple Sclerosis Society of Ireland, in which she launched their MS Readathon fundraiser in 2010. Lynch is also a member of the Board of Advisors for the non-profit organisation, The Harry Potter Alliance (HPA). With the HPA, she has supported same-sex marriage in Maine, taken part in a webcast fundraiser, written an article about body image and contributed to a fundraising book.

As an ambassador for J. K. Rowling's charity Lumos, Lynch and her Harry Potter co-star and fellow Lumos ambassador, Bonnie Wright, travelled to Haiti in 2016 to learn about why there are 30,000 children living in orphanages, and met children who had been rescued from terrible conditions and reunited with their families. Lynch stated about charity work for children and families, "Without families and without love, children can't be children. The most important thing as a child is to be with your family. And you have to do everything you can to keep that family unit in place".

Lynch contributed an essay to the 2018 book Feminists Don't Wear Pink and Other Lies, curated by Scarlett Curtis, whose royalties went to the United Nations charity Girl Up.

=== Activism and veganism ===
In a 2019 interview, Lynch said she "hated the blood [from raw meat]" as a child and, at age 11, she became a vegetarian. In 2015, she turned to veganism for ethical reasons. Lynch said that her activism is mostly done "in my free time as a way to give back and a way to right the world".

In 2015, attended the launch of a protest against live animal export organised by Compassion in World Farming that visited seven cities in the European Union. Since then, she has joined many animal rights demonstrations and campaigns. In May 2018, Lynch and a journalist travelled to Kerala, India to observe the treatment of the endangered Asian elephant. In August, she and actor Peter Egan joined the organisation Save the Asian Elephants to hand in a 200,000-name petition to the Department for Environment, Food and Rural Affairs, demanding to ban the advertisement in the United Kingdom of "unethical Asian elephant related holidays abroad", among other requests.

In 2017, Lynch narrated the short documentary iAnimal by Animal Equality, dealing with the dairy industry. The film received a nomination at the 2018 Raindance Film Festival. In June 2018, she narrated a short film by the Humane Society International against the dog and cat meat trade in Asia. In October 2019, Lynch was announced as a Lovie Award winner for her activism. The committee stated that she "raises the bar for others in a position of fame to use the Internet in the most creative and accessible ways possible, to introduce new ideas to people that can truly change our world for the better".

==== The ChickPeeps podcast ====
In November 2017, Lynch founded the podcast The ChickPeeps, co-hosted by Harry Potter and the Order of the Phoenix actor Robbie Jarvis, Surfers Against Sewage representative Momoko Hill, and Protego Foundation founder Tylor Starr. Its content is based on veganism and features discussions on diverse topics, often joined by prominent activists such as Ingrid Newkirk, Earthling Ed, and Victoria Moran, among many others. Lynch started The ChickPeeps with the intention of running "a bit more vulnerable and human [vegan podcast] that feels like you're hanging out with friends... where we have a laugh, maybe we learn some things, maybe we ask some questions".

==== Kinder Beauty Box ====
In November 2018, Lynch co-founded, along with American actress Daniella Monet, the vegan and cruelty-free make-up and beauty care box Kinder Beauty Box. The subscription box, which started its monthly delivery in January 2019, was intended to "put ethical brands in the spotlight" and "overcome confusing jargon" used by big brands that test on animals. Kinder Beauty Box was conceived after Lynch and Monet discussed the difficulty they had looking for vegan beauty products. The products are curated by them, shipped in sustainable packaging and a portion of the sales goes to animal rights and environmental causes and benefits for vegan rights.

==== Just Beings podcast ====
In August 2022, Lynch teamed up with psychologist and author, Dr. Melanie Joy, to launch a podcast called Just Beings. On the show, Lynch and Joy examine the common psychology that drives all harmful and unjust behaviours. Through conversations with changemakers, they explore how people can shift their thinking to create a more compassionate and just world for people, animals, and the planet — and improve their personal lives and relationships in the process.

=== J.K. Rowling's comments about trans people ===
When J.K. Rowling posted a series of tweets on Twitter about the transgender community starting in 2020, she received significant criticism, including from most Harry Potter cast members. In response, Lynch tweeted "it's irresponsible to discuss such a delicate topic" on social media, and "I wish [Rowling] wouldn't. That said, as a friend and admirer of Jo I can't forget what a generous and loving person she is." After posting these tweets and receiving blowback for supporting Rowling, Lynch deleted her Twitter account in 2020. In an interview with The Telegraph in 2023, Lynch stated compassion for both sides of the argument, "I know what it was like to be a teenager who hated my body so much I wanted to crawl out of my skin, so I have great compassion for trans people and I don't want to add to their pain. I do also think it's important that J.K. Rowling has been amplifying the voices of de-transitioners." Lynch stated the backlash against Rowling has surprised her, "I just felt that [Rowling's] character has always been to advocate for the most vulnerable members of society. The problem is that there's a disagreement over who's the most vulnerable. I do wish people would just give her more grace and listen to her."

== Personal life ==
Lynch lives in London, England. She stated in a 2018 interview that she has not lived in Ireland since age 18, and previously lived in Los Angeles for five years. In 2007, Lynch began a relationship with her Harry Potter cast member and ChickPeeps co-host Robbie Jarvis. Lynch did not make the relationship public until 2015, when she posted photos of herself and Jarvis to Instagram. She and Jarvis split the following year, though they remain on good terms. She then dated singer-songwriter AnDel in 2017. They have since broken up. Lynch started dating Frenchman Denis Skinner in 2021 after meeting in a London bar. The couple married at Wilton Music Hall in London on 21 August 2026.

In a 2014 interview, she mentioned her devout Catholic upbringing. "I stopped going to Mass a few years ago, mainly because I disagree with the rules," she said. "I don't like anything that's about punishing yourself and making you feel bad about yourself, and growing up I felt bad about indulging myself or doing anything for fun". Lynch's 2011 essay, "Why the Body Bind is My Nightmare", describes her emotional struggle with her appearance and how she managed to overcome it through allusions pertaining to the Harry Potter series.

In October 2021, Headline in the UK and Ballantine Books in the USA published Lynch's book The Opposite of Butterfly Hunting: The Tragedy and Glory of Growing Up – A Memoir. It details "her recovery from anorexia and how the conflict between the comfort of self-destruction and the liberation of creativity still rages inside of her".

Lynch has said she loves knitting, reading and "[dangling] off any circus apparatus within reach", as well as dancing and circus arts. As a vegan, she has shared vegan recipes for several Harry Potter delicacies such as butterbeer.

== Filmography ==
=== Film ===
Year	Title	Role	Notes
2007	Harry Potter and the Order of the Phoenix	Luna Lovegood	
2009	Harry Potter and the Half-Blood Prince	Luna Lovegood	
2010	Harry Potter and the Deathly Hallows – Part 1	Luna Lovegood	
2011	Harry Potter and the Deathly Hallows – Part 2	Luna Lovegood	
2013	G.B.F.	McKenzie Pryce	
2015	Addiction: A 60's Love Story	Theresa Bornstein	
2015	My Name Is Emily	Emily Egan	
2019	Madness in the Method	Abbie Fox	
2024	My Freaky Family	Betty Flood	Voice

=== Television ===
Year	Title	Role	Notes
2012	Sinbad	Alehna	Episode: "Land of the Dead"
2013	Apex	Regan	Episode: "Pilot"
2015	Danny and the Human Zoo	Bridget Riordan	Television film
2018	Dancing with the Stars	Herself (contestant)	Third place
2019	Middle School Moguls	Academy Voice / Tablet / Lunchbox (voice)	Episode: "The Making of a Mogul"
2020	Rise of the Teenage Mutant Ninja Turtles	Gentry (voice)	Episode: "Donnie vs. Witch Town"
2021	Silent Witness	Paisley Robertson	Episode: "Redemption" (2 parts)
2022	Harry Potter 20th Anniversary: Return to Hogwarts	Herself	Television special
2024	Harry Potter: Wizards of Baking	Herself	Television game show
2026–present	Dragon Striker	Ameline (voice)	Main cast

=== Shorts ===
Year	Title	Role	Notes
2013	It Don't Come Easy	Ella	
2019	Lucia Joyce: Full Capacity	Lucia Joyce	
2020	Europeans: Donnú Bréige (Fake Tan)	Róisín	
2021	Other Half	Icarus	animated short
2021	You Eat Other Animals?	Alien Queen	Released for World Vegan Day 2021
2022	Bus Girl	Beth	Jessica Henwick's Phone Trilogy
2024	Sandwich Man	Beth	Jessica Henwick's Phone Trilogy
2024	Sanctuary	Narrator	animated short
2025	Gardening	Leonora	animated short

=== Music video ===
Year	Title	Role	Performer(s)
2017	DISARM	Daisy Decibel	Bry

=== Video games ===
Year	Game	Role
2007	Harry Potter and the Order of the Phoenix	Luna Lovegood (voice)
2009	Harry Potter and the Half-Blood Prince	Luna Lovegood (voice)
2010	Harry Potter and the Deathly Hallows – Part 1	Luna Lovegood (voice)
2011	Harry Potter and the Deathly Hallows – Part 2	Luna Lovegood (voice)
2016	Lego Dimensions	Luna Lovegood (voice)

=== Stage ===
Year	Title	Role	Production(s)
2012	A Very Potter Senior Year	Luna Lovegood	LeakyCon 2012 at Hilton Chicago and Chicago, Illinois
2013	Houdini	Bess Houdini	Grand Theatre, Blackpool, Theatre Royal, Windsor, Stoke Repertory Theatre, Gaiety Theatre, Dublin and Swansea Grand Theatre
2017/18	Disco Pigs	Sinéad/"Runt"	Trafalgar Studios, Whitehall, Trafalgar Square, City of Westminster, London (West End); Irish Repertory Theatre, Manhattan, New York City (Off-Broadway)
2019	The Omission of the Family Coleman	Gaby	Theatre Royal, Bath, England (Off West End)
2019	Games for Lovers	Martha	The Vaults Theatre, London
2021	Calico	Lucia Joyce	Rehearsed reading produced via Zoom for Bloomsday 2021
2023	Under the Black Rock	Niamh Ryan	Arcola Theatre, London
2026	Pool (No Water)	—N/a	Everyman Theatre, Cork

=== Other roles ===
Year	Title	Role	Notes
2010	Foster	Narrator	novella by Claire Keegan, broadcast in 3 parts on BBC Radio 4
2017–2021	The ChickPeeps	Co-Host	Podcast with Tylor Starr, Robbie Jarvis, and Momoko Hill
2019	Dancing with Lucia	Lucia Joyce	Radio Documentary for RTÉ Lyric FM, directed by Deirdre Mulrooney
2020	Keep Your Eyes on Me	Narrator	Audiobook of the novel by Sam Blake
2020	The Fountain of Fair Fortune	Narrator	Audiobook of The Tales of Beedle the Bard. Based on the story by J. K. Rowling
2020	Obsessed with... Normal People	Co-Host	Official BBC Sounds companion podcast for the TV series Normal People
2021	We'd Need to Manage It	Narrator	Short story by Naoise Dolan, broadcast on BBC Radio 4
2021	The Opposite of Butterfly Hunting	Narrator	Audiobook of Lynch's own memoir
2021	Personal Space	Helen	Lead role; Radio play by Máiread Kiernan, broadcast on RTÉ Radio 1
2021	A Little Kinder	Co-Host	Podcast with Daniella Monet
2021	Life Sentence	Eve	Podcast; 1 Episode
2022	The No-Show	Siobhan	Audiobook of the novel by Beth O'Leary
2022	Obsessed with... Conversations with Friends	Co-Host	Official BBC Sounds companion podcast for the TV series Conversations with Friends; also broadcast on BBC Three
2022–2023	Just Beings	Co-Host	Podcast with Melanie Joy

== Awards and nominations ==
Year	Work	Award	Category	Result	Refs
2009	Harry Potter and the Half-Blood Prince	Young Artist Awards	Best Supporting Actress	Nominated	
2009	Harry Potter and the Half-Blood Prince	Scream Awards	Best Supporting Actress	Nominated	
2016	My Name Is Emily	Irish Film and Drama Awards	Actress in a Lead Role Film	Nominated	
2019	—N/a	Lovie Award	Special Achievement Award	Honored	

== See also ==
- List of vegans
