= Bournemouth Marathon =

Road running event in Bournemouth, England

Run Bournemouth (formerly the Bournemouth Marathon Festival) is an annual road running festival held each October in Bournemouth on the south coast of England. First staged in 2013 as the Bournemouth Marathon, the event originally included a full marathon alongside a half marathon, 10 km race, and shorter distances. The full marathon was discontinued in 2020; the festival has since continued under the Run Bournemouth name, headlined by the Bournemouth Half Marathon alongside a 10 km race, a 5 km evening race, and junior and children's races.

== Course and events ==
Run Bournemouth takes place over a weekend, typically in October, and is organised by GSi Events Ltd. The half marathon and 10 km races start near Hengistbury Head, run along the clifftops before dropping to the seafront promenade, and pass the ends of both Boscombe Pier and Bournemouth Pier before finishing at Bournemouth Pier Approach; the half marathon follows the route of the former full marathon.

The current programme comprises six races across the weekend:

- Bournemouth Half Marathon – 13.1 miles (21.1 km), the festival's headline race, run on the Sunday and open to participants aged 17 and over.
- Supersonic 10K – run on the Sunday morning ahead of the half marathon, open to those aged 15 and over.
- Supernova 5K – held on the Saturday evening; runners wear head torches and fluorescent clothing to complete a dusk/night route along the illuminated promenade and piers, and the race is open to all ages.
- Junior 2K – for ages 9 to 12, run on the Saturday.
- Junior 1.5K – for ages 6 to 8, run on the Saturday.
- Kids' Kilometre – for ages 3 to 6, an introductory race run on the Saturday.

Finishers of the half marathon, 10K and 5K receive a bespoke medal and finisher's t-shirt. Roads along the Bournemouth seafront, including sections of Southbourne, Boscombe and the town centre, are closed to traffic for the duration of the event, and the closures are coordinated with Bournemouth, Christchurch and Poole Council.

== Charity ==
Run Bournemouth operates a charity place system alongside standard entries: participants can register through a partner charity, typically at a discounted or free registration fee in exchange for a minimum fundraising pledge, or fundraise for a charity of their choice after securing their own place.

Macmillan Cancer Support is the event's official charity partner for the half marathon and 10K, with a stated fundraising target of £150,000 across the two races. Other national and local charities with an official fundraising presence at the event have included the British Heart Foundation, Teenage Cancer Trust, the NSPCC, the Dogs Trust, the Macular Society, the MS Society, Alzheimer Scotland and Renewable World.

Charity registration fees and minimum fundraising pledges vary by race and by charity; for example, quoted 2026 charity-place terms included a £20 registration fee with a £250 minimum pledge for the half marathon, £15 with a £150 minimum pledge for the 10K, and £10 with a £100 minimum pledge for the 5K. JustGiving is the event's official fundraising platform partner, integrated into the event's online registration system.
