= Simon Fitzmaurice =

Irish filmmaker

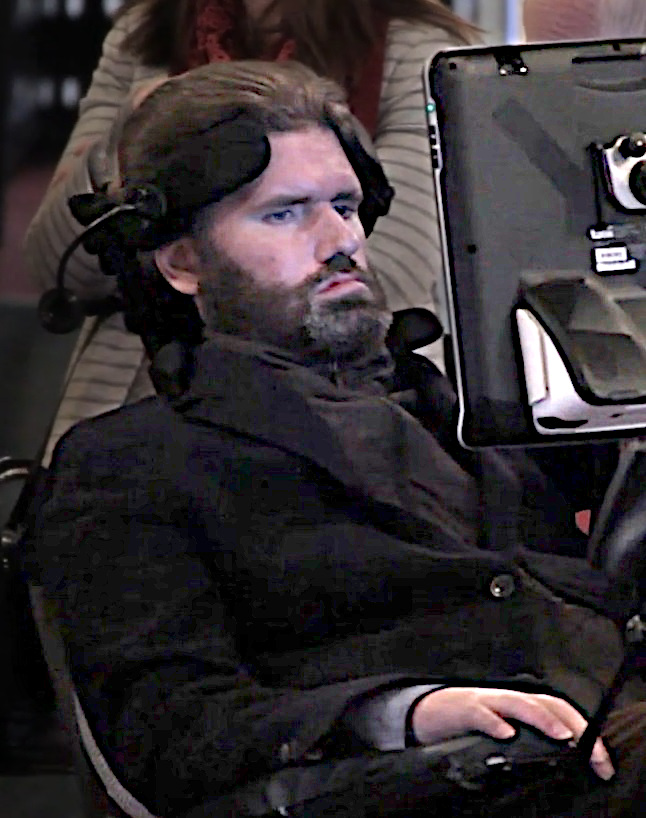
- Fitzmaurice at ADIFF 2016
- Born: c. 1973
- Died: 26 October 2017 (aged 43–44)
- Notable work: It's Not Yet Dark; My Name Is Emily
- Spouse: Ruth O'Neill
- Children: 5
- Parent(s): Damien and Florence Fitzmaurice

Simon Fitzmaurice (c. 1973 – 26 October 2017) was an Irish filmmaker. A resident of Greystones, County Wicklow, Fitzmaurice published a memoir titled It's Not Yet Dark in 2014 about his experience with motor neurone disease. He directed My Name Is Emily while living with the condition in 2015.

== Career ==
Fitzmaurice's second short film, The Sound of People, premiered at the 2008 Sundance Film Festival. Soon after, he was diagnosed with a motor neurone disease, which gradually left him completely paralyzed.

With the disease, he wrote and directed the feature film My Name Is Emily, which was released in 2015. Starring Evanna Lynch, Michael Smiley, and George Webster, it tells the story of a teenager who leaves her foster home to free her father from a mental hospital. My Name Is Emily was nominated for eight Irish Film & Television Academy Awards; Fitzmaurice received the Lifetime Achievement Award at the 2016 London Screenwriters' Festival for the work.

It's Not Yet Dark, a memoir, chronicles his experience living in a motorized wheelchair and communicating using an eye-tracking computer. The memoir was followed by the documentary It's Not Yet Dark, directed by Frankie Fenton. The documentary was narrated by Irish actor Colin Farrell.

Dublin Institute of Technology (DIT) conferred Simon Fitzmaurice with an Honorary Doctorate at a graduation ceremony at St Patrick's Cathedral in November 2016.

== Personal life ==
Simon Fitzmaurice was married to Ruth Fitzmaurice, with whom he had five children.

Simon died on Thursday, 26 October 2017. His funeral was held two days later at St Kilian's Roman Catholic Church in Greystones, attended by, among others, Lieut Cmdr Patricia Butler (aide-de-camp to President Michael D. Higgins), Fianna Fáil politician Stephen Donnelly, broadcaster Maia Dunphy, and James Vincent McMorrow, who performed one of Fitzmaurice’s favourite songs "We Don't Eat".
