= Multiple Sclerosis Society =

Multiple Sclerosis Society may refer to:

- The Multiple Sclerosis Society of Great Britain
- The Multiple Sclerosis Society of Canada
- The National Multiple Sclerosis Society of the United States.
- Other multiple sclerosis societies
