= East European Comic Con =

Speculative fiction convention in Romania

- Status: Active
- Genre: Speculative fiction
- Venue: Romexpo
- Location: Bucharest
- Country: Romania
- Inaugurated: 2013
- Attendance: 67,000 (April 2025)
- Filing status: For Profit
- Website: www.comic-con.ro

East European Comic Con (EECC) is a speculative fiction Fan convention held annually in Bucharest, Romania. It is East Europe's most important event dedicated to fans of comics, animations, video games, as well as TV series and movies.

== Events ==
Visitors are able to attend and take part in contests, video screenings and special sessions with movie and comics celebrities, as well as purchase products specific for this type of event.

The most well-known contests are the Cosplay costume contest and a Quiz contest. The Cosplay costume contest has participants performing a short play while wearing the costume of a character from a comic, video game, animation or movie, while they imitate the character's gestures and behaviors. The quiz contest is focused on anime, manga, TV series, comics and video games. An important part of the event is represented by the PC and console video game exhibitors and competitions. EECC is the largest gaming event in Romania.

== History ==
East European Comic Con started in the spring of 2013. At its first edition, EECC successfully gathered more than 9,000 "geeks". It opened the door to some fruitful partnerships and friendships. For two days, fans could participate in a Cosplay contest, LOL Contest, Quiz Contest or Illustration contest, and they could talk to artists or see a different side of their favorite actors. Victor Drujiniu – artist for DC Comics and Dark House, and Remus Brezeanu – the artist of The End of Times of Bram&Ben, and Puiu Manu – one of the best Romanian comics artist, were some of the 22 artists present at EECC 2013.

== Locations and dates ==
Dates	Location	Attendance	Official Comic-Con guests	Hosts	Notes
30–31 March 2013	Palatul National al Copiilor	9,400	John Rhys-Davies, Finn Jones, Victor Drujiniu, Remus Brezeanu, Johan Rasmus (Shookie), Vanessa (Paine Cosplay), Manuel D’Andrea, Enji Night, Okkido, Kana Cosplay, SolidSnake, Raymond Seregi, Costin Benescu, Butuc Laurentiu, Chelaru Bogdan, Cristian Dârstar, Dezarticulat, Puiu Manu, Dan Michiu, Robert Matei, Roman Giorge, Sava Valentin, Serghie Adrian, Alex Tamba, Ivan Alin, Grajdeanu Mihai, Drob Timotei, Dragomir Raluca, Dima Maximilian	Johan Rasmus	
9–11 May 2014	Romexpo, Bucharest	22,000	Jason Momoa, Mark Sheppard, Natalia Tena, Ian Churchill, Yaya Han, Kamui Cosplay, Giada Robin, CreativeMonkeyz, Sector 7, DoZa De Haş, 10 Lucruri	Johan Rasmus & Ken Huegel	
8–10 May 2015	Romexpo, Bucharest	30,240	Manu Bennett, Robert Knepper, John Noble, Osric Chau, Kristian Nairn, Dan Starkey (actor), Vsauce, CreativeMonkeyz, Sector 7	Maria Muller & Ken Huegel	
27–29 May 2016	Romexpo, Bucharest	38,000	Mark Pellegrino, Charles Dance, David Anders, Sylvester McCoy, Daniel Portman, Gemma Whelan	Maria Muller & Ken Huegel	
5–7 May 2017	Romexpo, Bucharest	45,000	Craig Parker, Tom Wlaschiha, Nathaniel Buzolic, Christopher Judge, Ellie Kendrick, Jefferson Hall (actor)	Maria Muller & Ken Huegel	
18–20 May 2018	Romexpo, Bucharest	48,000	Daniel Gillies, Jim Beaver, Andrew Scott (actor), Chris Rankin, Gethin Anthony, Staz Nair	Maria Muller & Ken Huegel	
24–26 May 2019	Romexpo, Bucharest	52,000	Manu Bennett, Vladimir Furdik, Adam Brown, Nicholas Brendon, Carice Van Houten, Paul Wesley	Staz Nair & Ken Huegel	
18–20 October 2019	BT Arena, Cluj-Napoca	23,000	Rick Cosnett, Kevin McNally, Alexander Ludwig, Manu Bennett, David Nykl, Vladimir Furdik	Maria Muller & Ken Huegel	
26–29 August 2021	Romexpo, Bucharest	–	Itziar Ituño, Ed Westwick, Anna Shaffer, John Romero	Maria Muller & Ken Huegel	
26–28 August 2022	Romexpo, Bucharest	52,500	Ross Marquand, Clive Standen, Graham McTavish, Simon Merrells, Kevin McNally, Inbar Lavi	Maria Muller	
19–21 May 2023	Romexpo, Bucharest	53,000	Tony Amendola, Dylan Sprayberry, Alexander Calvert, Dan Fogler, Stefan Kapicic, Eugene Simon	Toby Sebastian	
25–27 August 2023	Palace of Culture (Iași)	14,230	Sebastian Roche, Luka Peros, Nikola Djuricko, Manu Bennett	Naomi Grossman	
1–3 September 2023	Arena Nationala, Bucharest	50,250	Osric Chau, Greg Austin (actor), Tom Wlaschiha, Alfred Enoch, Dean-Charles Chapman, Manu Bennett, Mecia Simson	Ian Beattie & Tom Canton	
19–21 April 2024	Romexpo, Bucharest	56,000	Myanna Buring, Jacob Dudman, Alexander Vlahos, Adrian Rawlins, Jack Gleeson	Andrew Horton	
13-15 September 2024	Arena Nationala, Bucharest	55,000	Clinton Liberty, Mark Sheppard, Jamie Campbell Bower, George Blagden	Toby Sebastian & Greg Austin (actor)	
25–27 April 2025	Romexpo, Bucharest	66,700	Sujaya Dasgupta, Charles Edwards (actor), Daniel Gillies, Josha Stradowski, Jack Wolfe (actor)	Sam Phillips (English actor) & Rupert Young	
12-14 September 2025	Arena Nationala, Bucharest	57,090	Kat Graham, Mark Williams (actor), Royce Pierreson, Sandra Yi Sencindiver, Moe Bar-El, Michael Malarkey	George Webster (actor) & Toby Sebastian	
24–26 April 2026	Romexpo, Bucharest	70,000	Freddy Carter, Danielle Galligan, Amita Suman, Dominique Tipper, Seth Gilliam, Vincent Regan, Crystal Reed	Toby Sebastian & George Webster (actor)	
11-13 September 2026	Arena Nationala, Bucharest		James D'Arcy	George Webster (actor)	
