= Harry M. Weaver =

American neuroscientist (1909–1977)

Harry Merwyn Weaver
- Born: March 20, 1909; Lancaster, Ohio, U.S.
- Died: September 12, 1977 (aged 68); San Clemente, California, U.S.
- Education: Ohio State University
- Known for: Research into polio immunization
- Scientific career
- Fields: Virologist
- Workplaces: National Foundation for Infantile Paralysis

Harry M. Weaver (March 20, 1909 – September 12, 1977) was an American neuroscientist and researcher who made contributions to medical research in the fields of multiple sclerosis, and was the Director of Research at the National Foundation for Infantile Paralysis when the polio vaccine was discovered and developed by Jonas Salk. He also served as the Vice President for Research at the American Cancer Society, Vice President for Research and Development at the Schering Corporation, and Director of Research at the National Multiple Sclerosis Society.

Weaver was born in Lancaster, Ohio in 1909 and died at his home in San Clemente, California, aged 68.

== Career, 1946 to 1977 ==
- Director of Research, National Foundation for Infantile Paralysis, 1946 to 1953
- Vice President for Research, American Cancer Society, 1954 to 1961
- Vice President for Research, Schering Corporation, 1955 to 1966
- Director of Research, National Multiple Sclerosis Society, 1966 to 1977

== Contributions to polio vaccine ==
The polio vaccine was discovered and developed by Jonas Salk between 1952 and 1955. Weaver, acting as the Director of Research at the National Foundation for Infantile Paralysis, now known as the March of Dimes, from 1946 to 1953, supported Salk's work with a sense of urgency for the development of the Polio vaccine. Weaver's urgency for developing a vaccine as quickly as possible was somewhat counter to the development of the Oral polio vaccine by Albert Sabin between 1954 and 1961. However, his support of Salk's vaccine was considered to be paramount to the early end of the polio epidemic. Weaver dedicated his time and research into finding the main source of polio in order to develop a vaccine that would put an end to the disease. He planned out a way to get grants and broke it down into simple formula of how funding would work. His success was due to his organized approach to funding and his use of applied science to address the challenge.

== Harry Weaver Neuroscience Scholar Award ==
After many years of dedication to research of MS treatment and strong support for recruiting young investigators, Dr. Weaver's accomplishments were honored by the NMSS through the awarding of the Harry Weaver Neuroscience Scholar Award. This award is offered to researchers who have completed their MS training and are beginning their work in MS research. The award includes salary and research funding for a period of five years and is commonly given through universities.

== Albert and Mary Lasker Foundation: Award Jury Member ==
Weaver was a member of the Jury of the Albert and Mary Lasker Foundation for the 1957 Lasker Award.
