= My Name Is Emily =

2015 film

- Film poster
- Directed by: Simon Fitzmaurice
- Written by: Simon Fitzmaurice
- Produced by: Lesley McKimm; Kathryn Kennedy
- Starring: Evanna Lynch; George Webster; Michael Smiley
- Cinematography: Seamus Deasy
- Edited by: Emer Reynolds
- Music by: Stephen McKeon
- Production companies: Newgrange Pictures; Kennedy Films; Garagefilm International; Paradox
- Distributed by: Eclipse Pictures
- Release dates: 7 July 2015 (Galway); 8 April 2016 (Ireland)
- Running time: 94 minutes
- Country: Ireland
- Language: English

My Name is Emily is a 2015 Irish independent drama film written and directed by Simon Fitzmaurice in his only feature film credit; on 26 October 2017, he died of motor neurone disease. The film stars Evanna Lynch, Michael Smiley and newcomer George Webster. 16-year-old Emily runs away from her foster home, trying to free her writer father (Smiley) from a mental institution after not receiving a card for her birthday. The film follows Emily (Lynch) and Arden (Webster) as they travel across Ireland in a coming of age tale/road movie.

My Name is Emily premiered at the Galway Film Fleadh on 7 July 2015, and had a limited theatrical release in Ireland on 8 April 2016. It was released in the U.S. on 17 February 2017 in select areas. At Galway Film Fleadh producer Kathryn Kennedy won the Bingham Ray New Talent Award, and Seamus Deasy received the prize for Best Cinematography. My Name is Emily was nominated for eight IFTA Awards in 2016 including Best Film, Best Actress in a Lead Role (Lynch) and Best Film Script (Fitzmaurice).

== Plot ==
In Dublin, Ireland, 14-year-old Emily Egan (Lynch) has been placed into foster care after her philosophical father Robert (Smiley), a local university professor and best-selling author of Swimming and Sex is committed to a psychiatric institution in the northern part of the country following complaints from locals of disturbing behaviour (such as frequent public nudity), his papers having been signed by a distant relative who felt he was no longer competent to raising Emily. Two years later, after having been hauled from one foster home to the next, including her uncle's where an older cousin of hers attempted to sexually abuse her from reading her father's erotic novel, Emily lives with June (Chiarain) and Steve (Loui Vangelder), foster parents she feels are not the worst but too suffocating, often rebuffing their attempts at kindness, notably June's. Emily feels June pressures her to be happy when she finds herself incapable of doing so due to her clinical depression. In the present, she often reflects on her happy earlier childhood (Millie Donnelly, Hunter and Sadie Fitzmaurice, Sarah Minto) with her father, her unconventional home education with him and how he changed dramatically after the death of her mother, also named Emily (Mullins) on the night of her birthday in a car accident, an event that led to his mental breakdown; he became obsessed with writing, refusing to eat and sleep and was preoccupied with the concept that humans and the surrounding universe, such as a blade of grass, shared the same molecules. As an ode to her mother, Emily dons an intricate bracelet she used to wear at all times.

Emily is enrolled in a new secondary school and quickly attracts the attention of an awkward half-Irish, half-English classmate Arden (Webster) who is unrequitedly smitten with her, though she is initially standoffish and uninterested in his attempts of a relationship. Contrarily, Emily is outcast by her teachers and bullied by her peers (Hughes) for her oddity and intellectual arrogance, such as refusing to introduce herself on her first day and rebelling against an assignment to dissect a Wordsworth poem "Ode on Intimations of Immortality" for its obvious sexual message. On the day of her 16th birthday where Emily is troubled at the absence of a birthday card from her father, a tradition he has kept since his commitment, she contemplates suicide at the bottom of the school pool, much to the concern and frustration of her swimming teacher (McCann) who is forced to pull her to safety. Not comprehending her actions, she is further humiliated by her classmates as she is banned from class. Later that afternoon, Arden drops by her home to deliver a present, an old book handed down to him by his Irish grandmother (McCusker), John Steinbeck's The Grapes of Wrath. Emily does not thank him, though accepts the gift.

Thereafter, she welcomes him accompanying her on their way home from school. When she returns home however, she grows upset at still finding that no letter from her father has arrived in the mail and despite June's assurance, she has an emotional meltdown. The next morning, she meets Arden at his home during a confrontation with his strict, physically abusive father (Conlon) and sensitive, submissive mother (White) and pleads for him to help her travel to the psychiatric institution and rescue Robert. At first reluctant, Arden eventually agrees as they both skip school. At first, they attempt to hitchhike in the rain with no luck until Arden enlists the help of his Granny to borrow her 70s canary-yellow Renault 4. After a full day on the road, on the following morning the two stop by a supermarket for breakfast, though Emily manipulates her way into only paying for a bouquet of flowers for Robert while shoplifting the rest, which upsets Arden given he would rather pay "like normal people" would, prompting Emily to justify that the money would be more useful towards border crossing and questions what it means to be "normal".

Following this incident, Emily grows paranoid of authority, believing they will attempt to stop her from reaching her destination and at one point, orders Arden to drive away from a curious Guard (Ó Héalai) questioning them for IDs. Camping on the beach for the night, Emily and Arden are ambushed by a local gang. When Arden is beaten in an outnumbered fight and runs towards the car for help, Emily is left vulnerable inside the tent where she is threatened to be raped by the gang's leader, telling him coldly, "Fuck off." However, Arden returns having retrieved his deceased grandfather's handgun from the glove compartment, frightening the gang into submission as they flee. A mutual trust therein develops between Emily and Arden as they eventually arrive at the institution.

Arden invents a theatrical distraction atop the roof of one of the buildings, entertaining the patients whilst alarming the orderlies as Emily, bouquet in hand, searches for Robert. Coming upon his room however, she finds not her father but Dr. Golding (McGovern) who quietly informs her that her father is no longer a patient at the facility. Inviting her to his office, he explains to her that the hospital does not hold people against their will, that Robert, after some time, voluntarily admitted himself, a fact that greatly upsets Emily. Destroying the flowers outside, Arden comes to her aid where the two leave to Emily's grandfather's summerhouse, uncertain of their paths. After getting into a disagreement, Arden storms out of the home where Emily attempts to follow him, though meets her father instead unexpectedly. Emily confronts him about her abandonment trauma, saying, "You said nothing could separate us. But you did," not understanding why he would intentionally shut her out as she exits and runs towards the cliffs overlooking the ocean. Emily leaps into the water and her boots fall off. Arden retrieves her and pulls her to shore, expressing his feelings for her. Emily opens herself up to him and as the two head back towards the summerhouse, they make out in the bathroom. As Emily faces her father again wearing her mother's dress, she appears to forgive him and she agrees to return home to June while her father remains at the summerhouse. Emily's depression seems to lift as she faces the future more optimistically, running into the sea to greet Arden, smiling as he photographs her.

== Cast ==
- Evanna Lynch as Emily Egan
- Michael Smiley as Robert Egan
- George Webster as Arden
- Sarah Minto as Young Emily
- Deirdre Mullins as Emily's Mother
- Declan Conlon as Arden's Father
- Ali White as Arden's Mother
- Stella McCusker as Granny
- Martin McCann as Swimming Teacher
- Cathy Belton as Greasy Haired Teacher
- Dónall Ó Héalaí as Young Policeman
- Barry McGovern as Dr. Golding
- Rebecca Hughes as Main Bully
- Laura Matassa as Midwife
- Ally Ni Chiarain as June

== Production ==
Fitzmaurice began writing the script shortly after his 2008 Sundance premiere of his short film, The Sound of People and before he was diagnosed with motor neuron disease; he learned of his illness the same day him and his wife, Ruth, a radio professional, discovered they were pregnant with their third child. Upon being completely paralyzed by the disease and expected to live for only four more years by his doctors, he completed the script using a Tobii eye gaze computer that monitors and translates the movement of his eyes into words and audio with the assistance of predictive text function. In order to raise production costs for the film, on 8 November 2013, producers set up a thirty-day crowd funding campaign on Indiegogo. The campaign quickly gained support from fellow Irish and British celebrities, including Colin Farrell, Alan Rickman, Sam Neill, Jim Sheridan, Lenny Abrahamson, Kirsten Sheridan and Shimmy Marcus. On 16 September 2014, it was announced that Evanna Lynch was cast in the lead alongside Michael Smiley and newcomer George Webster in supporting roles.

Lynch later stated in an interview some of the striking similarities between Emily and her former character of Luna Lovegood in the Harry Potter films:

There are a lot of similarities, I think, and it’s so true in [Emily's] family life as well. Even the fact that he’s the father of the philosopher and has all these crazy ideas and attracts this cultish following is very similar to Xenophilius [Luna's father]. What attracts me to all characters is just authenticity and that boldness of self-expression, which I think they both do. Luna does it effortlessly in that she’s who she is and she has no problem with that and she doesn’t ever try to inhibit or change herself. And I think Emily is the same way, slightly more defiantly. I think Emily is a lot angrier at the world and sees so much fakery and pretension among her teenage peers, and I think she rebels against that by being so authentic and so true to herself. I just admire women like that because I, certainly growing up, felt unusual, felt odd, and felt I didn’t really have a place where I fit. But I always felt uncomfortable like that, and those women, like Emily and like Luna, they give me the confidence to just fit in that uncomfortable space.

Principal photography began on 17 September 2014 on location in Bray, County Wicklow and Dublin and lasted for five weeks. Due to his computer software being sensitive to direct sunlight, Fitzmaurice required special accommodations, such as being sheltered by darkened tents, in order for him to communicate through his computer to his cast and crew.

Prior to the production, director Frankie Fenton began shooting a documentary feature, It's Not Yet Dark following the progression of Fitzmaurice's disease and the filming of Emily.

== Reception ==
=== Critical response ===
The film generated mostly favourable reviews from critics. Review aggregation website Rotten Tomatoes gives the film a rating of 89%, based on 19 reviews, with an average rating of 7.1/10. Metacritic gives the film a weighted average score of 55 out of 100, based on reviews from 6 critics, indicating "mixed or average reviews". The film was met with critical praise in Ireland where it received standing ovations at its festival premiere whereas overseas, the reaction was more mixed. The clichéd narrative structure has been largely criticized while the performances and cinematography have been generally welcomed.

==== Irish critics ====
Áine O'Connor of The Irish Independent gives the film three stars out of five, saying "Fitzmaurice's achievement as the first person with motor neurone disease to write and direct a feature has been well documented. He started off typing with his hands and, as his physical functions were lost, he finished with iris recognition software. This is a sweet story with philosophical moments, very much in an indie style [...] and it is a really nice-looking film. Although it might be a little esoteric for some tastes, it's a film with great heart." Paul Whitington of The Irish Independent states that the film "catches the unhinged passion of the teenage state, and ends as uncertainly as perhaps it should." Donald Clarke of The Irish Times awards the film four out of five stars, calling it "a strange, but easily accessible beast that deserves to do well," the photography "elegant" and Smiley's performance "unbeatable" whereas Lynch "has an angular eccentricity that suits the role perfectly" and Webster "wields the sort of cheekbones from which mainstream careers are launched."

Aubrey Malone rates the film four out of five stars, stating that despite "some contrivances in the plot" and deus ex machina conveniences, "this is a sweet little film that charms you more and more as it goes on, right up to the point near the end when there's a stunning revelation about Webster;" it is a story "about a world that sometimes doesn't understand, and a man [Smiley] who has to accept that sometimes it's not the world that's out of step with him as much as he who's out of step with it." Writing of the performances, he states that "Evanna Lynch shows just the right mix of innocence and experience as the confused adolescent growing into womanhood. Smiley, a young man who looks like Leonardo DiCaprio and talks like Jack Dee, plays off her with amiable bewilderment."

Michael Lee from Film Ireland writes: "Right off the bat, writer/director Simon Fitzmaurice masterfully invites us inside Emily’s head, and sets up an unquestionably potent relationship with her and the audience. She bursts through the surface gasping for air and into the suffocating present. [...] Evanna Lynch’s central performance brings an unflinching volatility to Emily, that’s magnetic to look at. New kid on the street, George Webster, shows some serious acting chops, proving he’s more than just a One Direction look alike, his genuine sense of naivety gives endless warmth and charm. And the inimitable Michael Smiley radiates true genius as he gravitates from comic to tragic in the blink of an eye." He calls the cinematography "evocative" and the musical score "textured" with incorporated songs from the likes of James Vincent McMorrow, Lisa Hannigan, Cat Dowling, Liza Flume, Hudson Taylor, Lisa Mitchell, Printer Clips and Jake Bugg.

Harry Guerin of RTÉ Ireland gives the film four out of five stars and calls it "an adapt-to-your-own-life story about mental health, memory and loss that offers something different across the generations. To say it's a dry-eye challenge is quite the understatement." Roger Moore gives a mixed review, rating the film two and a half out of four stars and asserts that "it's nice to see that there's life after Luna Lovegood for Evanna Lynch. The diminutive Irish actress, sort of a soulful pixie in the Potter films, makes the most of one last shot at playing a teenager." He compliments the characterizations, expressing that the two leads "give their characters an aching awkwardness, so that we can't quite tell if Emily is rebuffing [Arden's] little kindnesses/romantic entreaties" where "the winsome Lynch, narrating her story [...] makes a heroine worth knowing and following to the ends of Ireland, with or without a wand" and credits the film in general as "meditative" and "writerly;" the director "fills the soundtrack with Emily's narration [...] Images of the teen holding herself under water as she ponders the universe (And suicide?) blend[ed] with flashbacks." On the negative side, he concludes "there's not much to its second half," writing off the teen romance and slow pace.

Ben O'Gorman of Galway Advertiser singles out the performances, calling them "wonderful": Evanna Lynch "gives Emily a lightness and ethereal quality, but is still a commanding lead, showing her inner pain with a subtlety beyond her years. Emily’s father Robert is played by the always incredible Michael Smiley, who captures the loneliness of mental illness with humour and heartbreaking honesty." He further praises the writing for its progressive and positive portrayal of mental illness and the film's stunning cinematography. D.O.P. Seamus Deasy "captures Ireland beautifully. It is not bathed in sun nor is it raining like a monsoon. It is fresh, misty, and real, you can smell it through the screen."

==== International critics ====
Michael Sicinski, covering for Cinema Scope at the Toronto International Film Festival (TIFF), awards the film one and one-half stars out of five, writing it off as "achingly predictable in both plot and technique. Meet-cutes, flashbacks to happier days, the boy's wonder and befuddlement at this damaged Manic Pixie, sappy sub-Sarah McLachlan music cues, and a rainbow in the morning over the tent where Emily and Arden shared the night—this is strictly straight-to-video material. The most interesting elements of Emily, actually, are extra-textual," noting the director's ill health with MND.

Serena Donadoni of Village Voice cites the film as "melancholy" with an often dreary tone, especially seen in the protagonist's early contemplation of suicide by drowning due to severe clinical depression, adding that director Fizmaurice's "characters shut down emotionally after trauma, but [he] offers them a path to emerge from isolation. His script indulges in misty Irish fatalism, the florid language of literary adolescents and Robert's hodgepodge philosophy." Despite the first act's relatively dark themes, the film "gets lighter as it goes along, releasing tension and pretension."

Scott Tobias of Variety rates the film two and a half out of five stars, calling it "precocious" and says that "to draw connections between on-screen action and off-screen biography, there’s no denying that Fitzmaurice’s sensitive road picture teeters on the precipice between life and death [...] Emily is an unusually serious and circumspect teenager, schooled in Wordsworth and John Steinbeck, but also schooled by hard knocks." Despite certain awarding aspects, such as heavy-handed emotion and "poetic phraseology," the film "never comes to satisfying fruition, perhaps as a consequence of Emily’s obsession with the past and how profoundly her father’s intellect and temperament has affected her personality. Though travelogue beauty of rolling Irish hills and lakes comes alive through DP Seamus Deasy’s lens, the second act slogs through frisky getting-to-know-you sessions between Emily and Arden, and contrived situations," noting that the relationship between the two budding teens never really feels developed. Bill Newcott for AARP awards the film four stars out of five, praising its "smart script and nuanced direction," labeling it as a quintessential work "to take its rightful place beside such classic coming-of-age films as Sixteen Candles and Stand By Me." He adds that due to the director having led the project from a wheelchair and mechanical aid, "even a bad film by Fitzmaurice would be a staggering achievement." He writes of the performances: "Lynch's Emily is a pleasingly complex lass — wise in the ways of the world thanks to her father's tutelage, yet naive enough to believe that sheer force of will can transform even the knottiest circumstances. [...] [She] maintains a stalwart poker face throughout, inviting us to read Emily's emotions through her body language, alternately stiff-legged and limber. It's a lovingly physical performance elicited by a director who cannot move a muscle."

Jeannette Catsoulis of The New York Times writes: "[S]lipping from enchanting to trite, magical to indulgent with some regularity," the "beautifully warm performances and Seamus Deasy’s easy-on-the-eyes cinematography" may be enough to win over audiences despite its flaws. She notes that the performance of Lynch and characterization of Emily's father, Robert outshines the film's imperfections, saying: "Displaying the same ethereal quality she brought to the character of Luna Lovegood in the 'Harry Potter' movies, Ms. Lynch makes Emily a lonely mermaid, more at home in water than on land" though the real subject finds itself in Robert "in the brief glimpses of [his] unstable passions [...] terrors of madness" and "glittering panic of parenthood."

Writing for Film Journal, Edward Douglas lends a negative commentary, stating: "An emotion-filled coming-of-age drama that’s more impressive for the filmmaker’s personal efforts to get the movie made than the actual film itself," mentioning that the 2017 Sundance documentary made on Fitzmaurice's illness during the production of Emily is far more praiseworthy. "Fitzmaurice’s brave personal story to make his first feature is peripheral, and though that fact can’t be completely forgotten once you know it, the film really needs to be rated on its own artistic and cinematic merits." He cites the film as uninteresting, likening it to a young-adult novel where it "feels like it’s based on" one; "Emily often acts like the type of bratty teen know-it-all we often see in those adaptations." He adds that often, the script feels "a little too precious or even pretentious—partially because Fitzmaurice’s dialogue sometimes feels stilted, as if he’s trying too hard." Receiving the performances, he says: "Lynch has a pleasantly lilting voice that’s almost soothing to listen to as she talks about her memories" which "sadly vanishes once Emily’s road trip begins. Lynch is a decent enough actress, but not quite on par with her country-mate Saoirse Ronan, who could very well have brought more depth to the role. But she does show potential as a leading actor, and her chemistry with Webster is solid enough to make you believe their relationship [...] even if the emotional range displayed by the two actors seems fairly muted." Likewise, "the more experienced Smiley brings more out of Lynch than her younger co-star." He further compares the cinematography to Asia Argento's adaptation The Heart Is Deceitful Above All Things with its "washed-out and exaggerated colors." Of the musical score, he cites: "Fitzmaurice has a good ear for picking the right song to help set the mood, although at times you’re reminded how much better Sing Street director John Carney is at this sort of thing." He concludes that despite its glaring flaws, the film offers an emotional second act.

Frank Scheck of The Hollywood Reporter gives a mainly favourable analysis, writing the conclusion of Emily and Arden's destination as "surprising," though noting that the bulk of the film "suffers from a plethora of painful aphorisms on the order of 'If you hide from death, you hide from life.' But it nonetheless exerts an undeniable charm, thanks to Lynch’s winsome portrayal and Smiley’s entertainingly manic performance as the eccentric father. And much of the imagery, including several sequences featuring a watery motif, proves visually enchanting."

Glenn Kenny for RogerEbert.com gives the film two stars out of four, calling it "an average and in several respects a kind of clichéd and frayed coming-of-age movie." Writing its philosophy and protagonist off as "cranky," emotionally blocked and " predictably prickly," he notes that "[t]he best thing about Emily is that she's played by Evanna Lynch. Lynch, who played the charmingly abstracted Luna Lovegood in some of the Harry Potter pictures, has grown into a young woman who looks like a rougher-edged Saoirse Ronan, and she brings a gritty conviction to the antisocial tendencies that Emily cultivates after her beloved dad." He concludes that despite his overall dislike of the film, he applauds Fitzmaurice's "miracle" in completing a feature due to his disability, saying: "if you're a human being you have a rooting interest in Mr. Fitzmaurice. [...] [O]ne aspect of this film for which I have unqualified enthusiasm is the way [he] and his cinematographer Seamus Deasy shoot the various Irish locations, and how they place the characters therein; the effect is often beautifully picturesque without being in the least bit touristy. [...] It represents the movie’s most seductive achievement."

=== Accolades ===
Awards
Award	Category	Recipients	Result
Galway Film Fleadh	Bingham Ray New Talent Award	Kathryn Kennedy	Won
Galway Film Fleadh	Best Cinematography	Seamus Deasy	Won
Galway Film Fleadh	Best Feature Film (audience vote)		Nominated
Irish Film & Television Awards	Best Film		Nominated
Irish Film & Television Awards	Actress in a Lead Role	Evanna Lynch	Nominated
Irish Film & Television Awards	Actor in Supporting Role	Michael Smiley	Nominated
Irish Film & Television Awards	Film Script	Simon Fitzmaurice	Nominated
Irish Film & Television Awards	Cinematography	Seamus Deasy	Nominated
Irish Film & Television Awards	Editing	Emer Reynolds	Nominated
Irish Film & Television Awards	Original Music	Stephen McKeon	Nominated
Irish Film & Television Awards	Sound		Nominated
