= Robbie Jarvis =

British actor

- Born: Robert Stephen Jarvis; 7 May 1986 (age 40); Yeovil, Somerset, England
- Other names: Robert Jarvis, Robbie
- Years active: 2006–present

Robert Stephen Jarvis (born 7 May 1986) is a British actor who has appeared in films including Harry Potter and the Order of the Phoenix, and in television programmes including Genie in the House, The History Boys, and Waking the Dead.

Jarvis was born in Yeovil, Somerset. He attended the Littlehampton Community School and Chichester College, He joined the National Youth Theatre aged 16 and performed with the company until he was 18. Jarvis played young James Potter in the film adaptation of Harry Potter and the Order of the Phoenix (2007). In 2006, he made a brief appearance in the Nickelodeon show Genie in the House and did voice work for the acclaimed film The History Boys. He has also guest starred in episodes of Waking the Dead for the BBC and ITV's Trial & Retribution. He returned to the stage in 2012 at the Southwark Playhouse in the latest play by Philip Ridley, Shivered.

== Personal life ==
Robbie Jarvis met Evanna Lynch while filming Harry Potter and the Order of the Phoenix in 2006. They dated for 3 years from 2014 - 2017 and remain close friends.

Robbie Jarvis is married to professional volleyball player Zoe Fleck. They announced they were engaged in March 2024 and were married on May 4, 2025.

== Filmography ==
- Genie in the House (2006), Billy – "Out of Our Minds"
- Harry Potter and the Order of the Phoenix (2007), Teenage James Potter
- Waking The Dead – "Double Bind" (2007), Young Chris Lennon
- Trial & Retribution XVII: Conviction (2008), Mark
- The Space You Leave aka Sea Change (2008), Rupert
- Coming Back (2009), Steve
- The Real Midnight Express (2010), Billy Hayes
- Upstairs Downstairs (2012), John F. Kennedy
- All Is by My Side (2013), Andrew Loog Oldham
- East Enders (2015), Lieutenant Harry Fielding
- Casualty (2015), Nathan Flynn
- Harley and the Davidsons (2016), Ira Mason
- Torchwood (2017), Stephen
- Torchwood: The Sins of Captain John (2020), Trevor, Guard, Prison Guard
- Man with a Van (2020), Travis Forbes
- The Lower Bottoms (2021), Owen Edwards
- A Royal Christmas on Ice (2022), Marshall
- Table Read Podcast (2023), Quinn Sparacello
- Rebel Moon Part 1 (2023), Communications Officer - Conning Tower
- Rebel Moon Part 2 (2024), Communications Officer - Conning Tower
