= Fly for MS =

U.S. nonprofit organization

Fly for MS is a New York City-based non-profit organization started by pilots taking a novel approach to dealing with multiple sclerosis, offering flights in small aircraft to mobility-impaired patients, some of whom have never been in an aircraft, and stimulating media coverage. Its slogan is "We Give Wings to Those Who Cannot Walk". Thus far, the flight programs have been conducted in 2010 and 2015 across locations in the Western Hemisphere.

== Goals ==
Fly for MS aims to raise global awareness for multiple sclerosis by putting the faces of patients and neurologists directly on national news to voice their concerns so that health regulators can take action. Fly for MS flies a small plane a daringly long distance and offers MS patients free flights in the aircraft. Many of the patients cannot walk, and for many it is the first time in an airplane. This formula makes for a very compelling story covered on national evening news.

== History ==
Fly for MS has now visited over 40 countries and flown over 60,000 miles. In 2010 Fly for MS was born and launched its first mission to Europe. In 2015 Fly for MS launched its second mission through "The Americas" and visited Canada, US, and the Caribbean, and most countries in Central and South America.

== Aircraft ==
The 2015-2016 aircraft was a Cirrus SR22 piloted by Tomas Vykruta and Fouad Ahmed.

The 2010 aircraft was Cessna 340 piloted by Andrei Floroiu and Keith Siilats.

== 2015-2016 mission ==
In 2015 Fly for MS announced its second mission throughout "The Americas". The mission spans countries from Canada to Chile. The first media coverage came from AOPA.

=== 2015 founding team ===
Tomas Vykruta, Fly for MS chief pilot. Vykruta holds a commercial pilot rating, flight instructor rating and multi engine ratings. Vykruta is a Google staff engineer.

Fouad Ahmed started out as a student pilot but received private pilot his rating at the start of the mission. Ahmed was formerly a wallstreet risk manager at Apollo (APOL).

=== Countries visited ===
The aircraft organized flying events in 12 countries, 16 locations.

Toronto, Canada Fort Lauderdale, USA Puerto Rico, USA Medellin, Colombia Cali, Colombia Pirrasununga Air Force Base, Brazil Montevideo, Uruguay Buenos Aires, Argentina Asuncion, Paraguay Santiago, Chile Lima, Peru Guayaquil, Ecuador Guatemala City, Guatemala Mexico City, Mexico Cancun, Mexico

=== Notable television coverage ===
Tomas Vykruta and Fouad Ahmed's mission was covered on national evening news. Notable examples:

CNN Chile Globo EPTV Brazil Hecho TV Guatemala Noticieros Televisa Mexico WAPA TV Puerto Rico El Pelicula Peru

=== Support from Air Force ===
The Fly for MS received support from the Brazilian Air Force, Uruguayan Air Force and Peruvian Air Force. The events were held at the air force bases directly and MS patients, media were given special access to the air force and aircraft.

=== International media coverage ===
BBC Mundo reported on the event: "For years, Google engineer Tomas Vykruta has invented technologies that use hundreds of millions of people worldwide. But one day the young New York decided he wanted to get closer to who he could help." MSN Barcelona reported

=== Reactions from multiple sclerosis societies ===
MSIF published about the mission.

== 2010 mission ==
In the summer of 2010 Fly for MS was born and launched its first flight.

=== Founding team ===
Andrei Floriou, original founder of Fly for MS. Pilot for European mission. Keith Siilats, pilot for European mission.
