= MS Readathon =

Children reading fundraising event

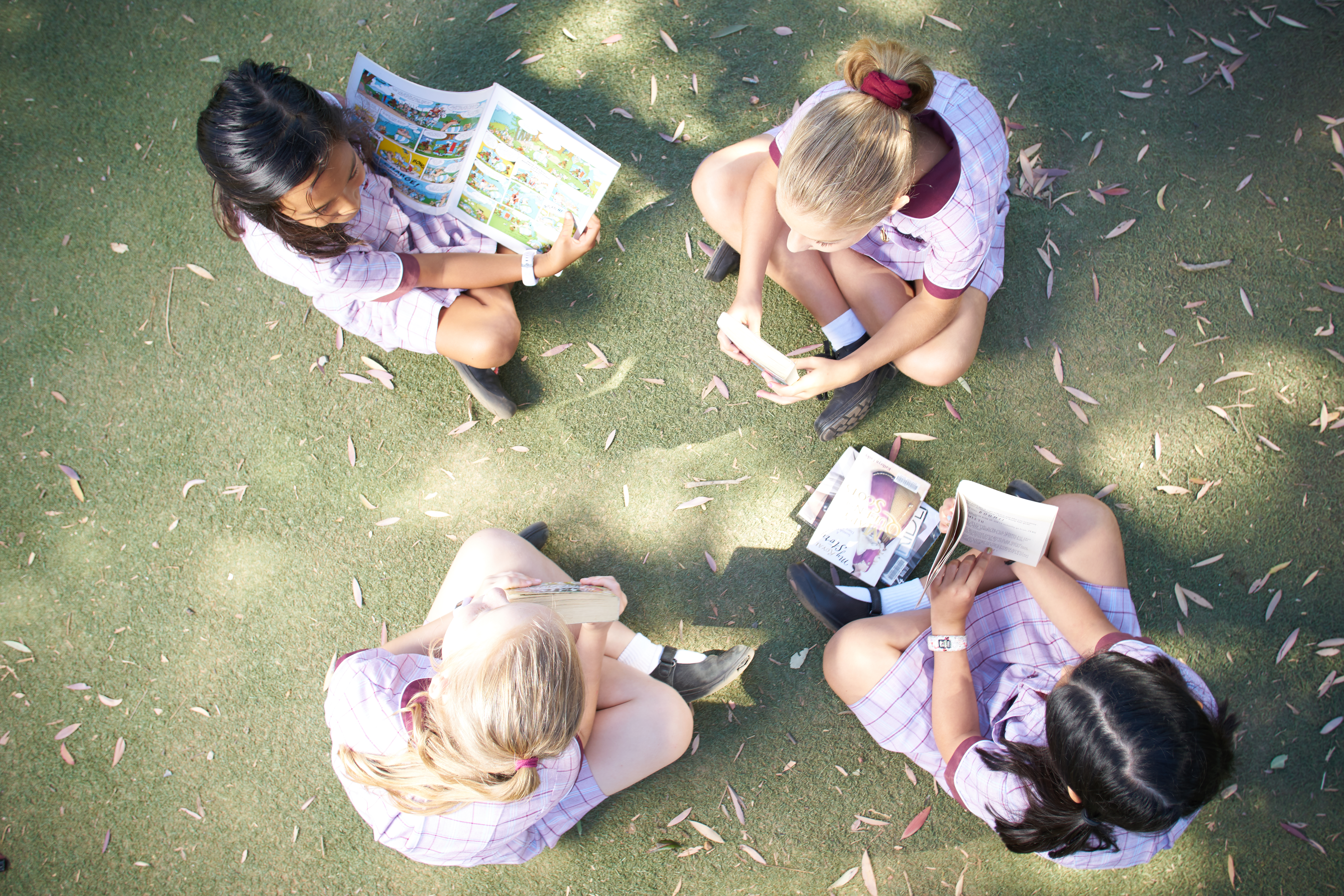

The MS Readathon is an annual sponsored reading event held by the MS Societies in Australia, Ireland, the United States, and Canada.

== Australia ==
The MS Readathon in Australia started in 1979. The MS Readathon encourages Australian children to read books, learn about multiple sclerosis (MS), and raise funds to help people who are living with multiple sclerosis.

Participants read as many books as they can throughout the month of August. The money they raise funds vital services for Australians living with MS, such as MS Family Camps, Family Days, and family-support services. In 2020, over $3.2 million was raised nationally from over 50,000 participants.

== Ireland ==
The MS Readathon in Ireland started in 1988. The annual sponsored read, organized by the charity MS Ireland, encourages children (and since 2003, adults) to read as many books as possible, and to collect a fixed amount per book from sponsors. The money collected goes towards MS Ireland's activities concerning sufferers of multiple sclerosis. In 2003, the charity raised over 1.2 million euros.
