= Multiple Sclerosis Australia =

Australian non-profit organization

Multiple Sclerosis Australia, or MS Australia, is a national non-profit organization in Australia that coordinates and allocates funds for multiple sclerosis research.

== Founding ==
MS Australia was established in 2004 by founding chairman Simon McKeon. McKeon handed over to current chairman Paul Murnane in 2010, but still remains the organization's patron. Founding CEO Jeremy Wright handed over to the current CEO, Matthew Miles in 2013. MS Australia was created as an MS-specific national research initiative whose aim is to utilize the Australian science community, and to provide a collaborative approach to MS research.

== Contributions ==
MS Australia is a managing member of the International Progressive MS Alliance, which focuses on progressive multiple sclerosis.

The organization is also a contributor to the Multiple Sclerosis International Federation (MSIF), based in London.

More than $36.7 million has been awarded to 254 MS research projects across both Australia and New Zealand since the organization's establishment in 2004.

MS Australia provided funding for a trial to test whether vitamin D supplementation can prevent MS in those who are at risk of developing the disease. This study had similar results to an earlier study published in Neurological Research International.

The organization supported the Australian-New Zealand MS Genetics Consortium, which in 2009 discovered two of the key risk genes in MS and subsequently contributed to the International MS Genetics Consortium, that has now discovered over 200 genes that contribute to the risk of developing MS.

In 2017, research funded by the organization discovered a possible molecular pathway (the kynurenine pathway) for MS progression, the activation of which may be involved in MS progression. This pathway has already been implicated in other neurological disorders.

Also in 2017, MS Australia co-founded a three-year, $750,000 multiple sclerosis paired research fellowship, funding a senior laboratory research fellow and senior MS clinician at the University of Tasmania's Menzies Institute for Medical Research, with the aim of furthering research into developing treatments for MS.

== Awards ==
=== 2015 ===
- Australian Charity Awards' Charity of the Year.
- Public Relations Institute of Australia (PRIA) Golden Target Awards – 'Highly Commended' in the Small Budget/Pro Bono category.

=== 2016 ===
- Fundraising Institute of Australia's 'Most Effective Creative Campaign Award' for Kiss Goodbye to MS.
- Fundraising Institute of Australia's special Events Under $5 Million'.
- Australian Charity Awards Outstanding Achievement Award.

=== 2017 ===
- Telstra Business Awards, 'Australian Charity of the Year'.
- Telstra Business Awards, 'NSW Charity of the Year'.
- Telstra Business Awards, 'NSW Business of the Year'.
- Australian Charity Awards, 'Outstanding Achievement Award'.

== Campaigns ==
MS Australia launched a global fundraising campaign, Kiss Goodbye to MS, in 2012. The campaign, which MS International lauded for the scale of the fundraising, was launched to both advance public awareness of the disease, and to raise funds for ongoing research. Since the establishment of the campaign, Kiss Goodbye to MS is now operating in over 15 different countries and is the only global campaign dedicated solely to fundraising for MS research, as at 2016.

== MS Australia Platforms ==
Some of these collaborations are:

- MS Research Australia Brain Bank
- Australian MS Longitudinal Study (AMSLS)
- Prev ANZ- A clinical prevention trial into the effects of vitamin D on MS.
- ANZ gene- A collaborative Australia-New Zealand genetics study seeking to identify the genes linked with MS.
- Autologous Haemopoietic Stem Cell Treatment (AHSCT) registry.
