= Multiple Sclerosis Society of Canada =

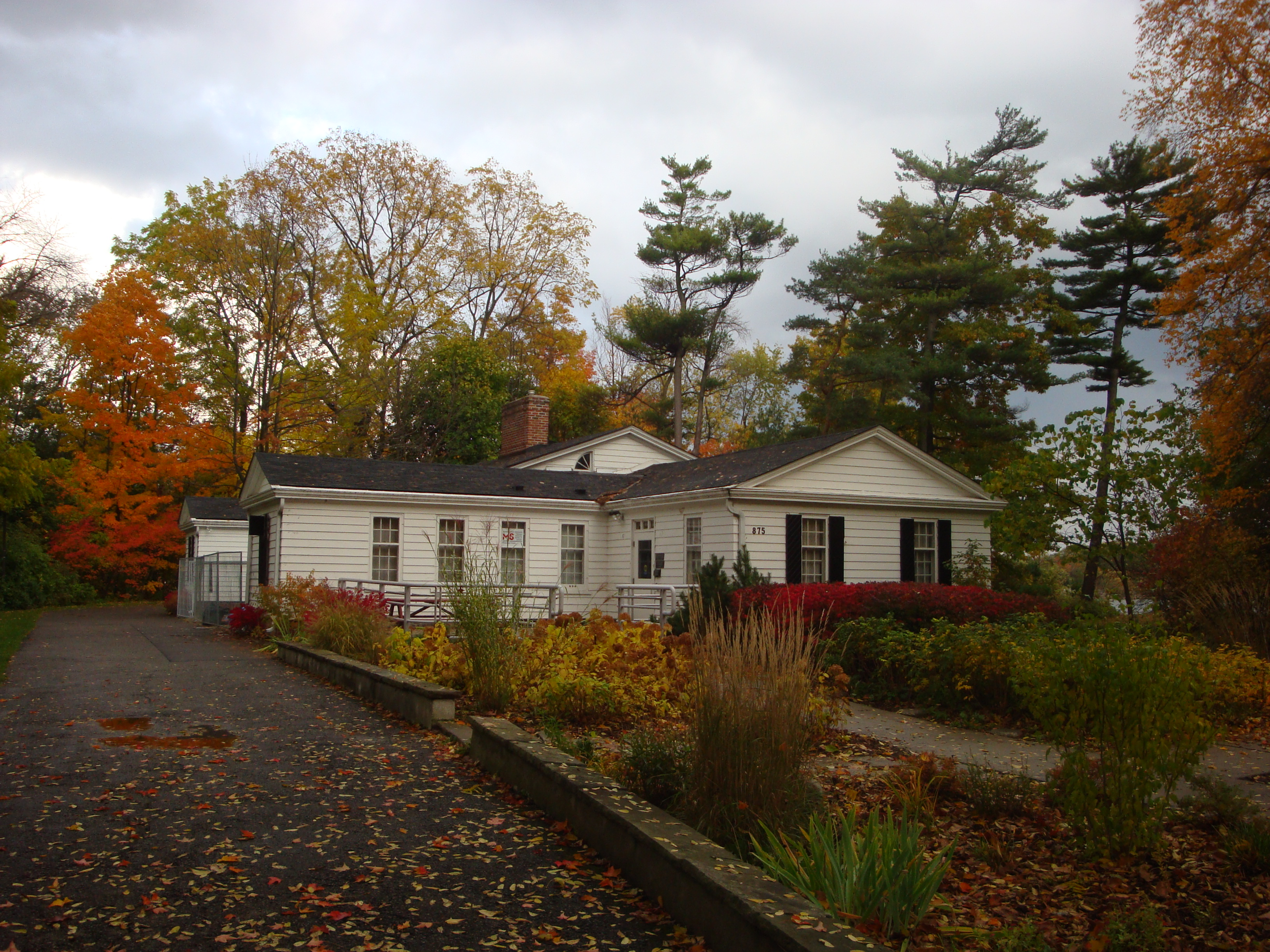
- Multiple Sclerosis Society of Canada - Mississauga Chapter office
- Founded: 1948
- Founder: Evelyn Gotlieb Opal, Harry H. Bell and Sylvia Lawry
- Website: www.mssociety.ca

Founded in 1948, the Multiple Sclerosis Society of Canada promotes multiple sclerosis (MS) research and provides education and services to people with MS and their families and caregivers. The society's mission is to seek a cure for MS and to enable people affected by MS to enhance their quality of life.

The MS Society of Canada is governed by a National Board of Directors composed of 27 volunteer members who are elected annually. The seven regional divisions and nearly 120 chapters are also governed by elected volunteer boards of directors. The society has 28,000 members. The head office is in Toronto, Ontario. Division offices are located in Dartmouth, Montreal, Toronto, London, Winnipeg, Regina, Edmonton, and Burnaby.

== MS Walk ==
The MS Walk is the society’s largest pledge-based fundraiser involving over 60,000 participants and volunteers in more than 160 communities across Canada. The Walk began in 1991 and in 2008, it raised over $12 million. Money raised through the MS Walk fund much needed research and services to 55,000-75,000 Canadians living with MS.

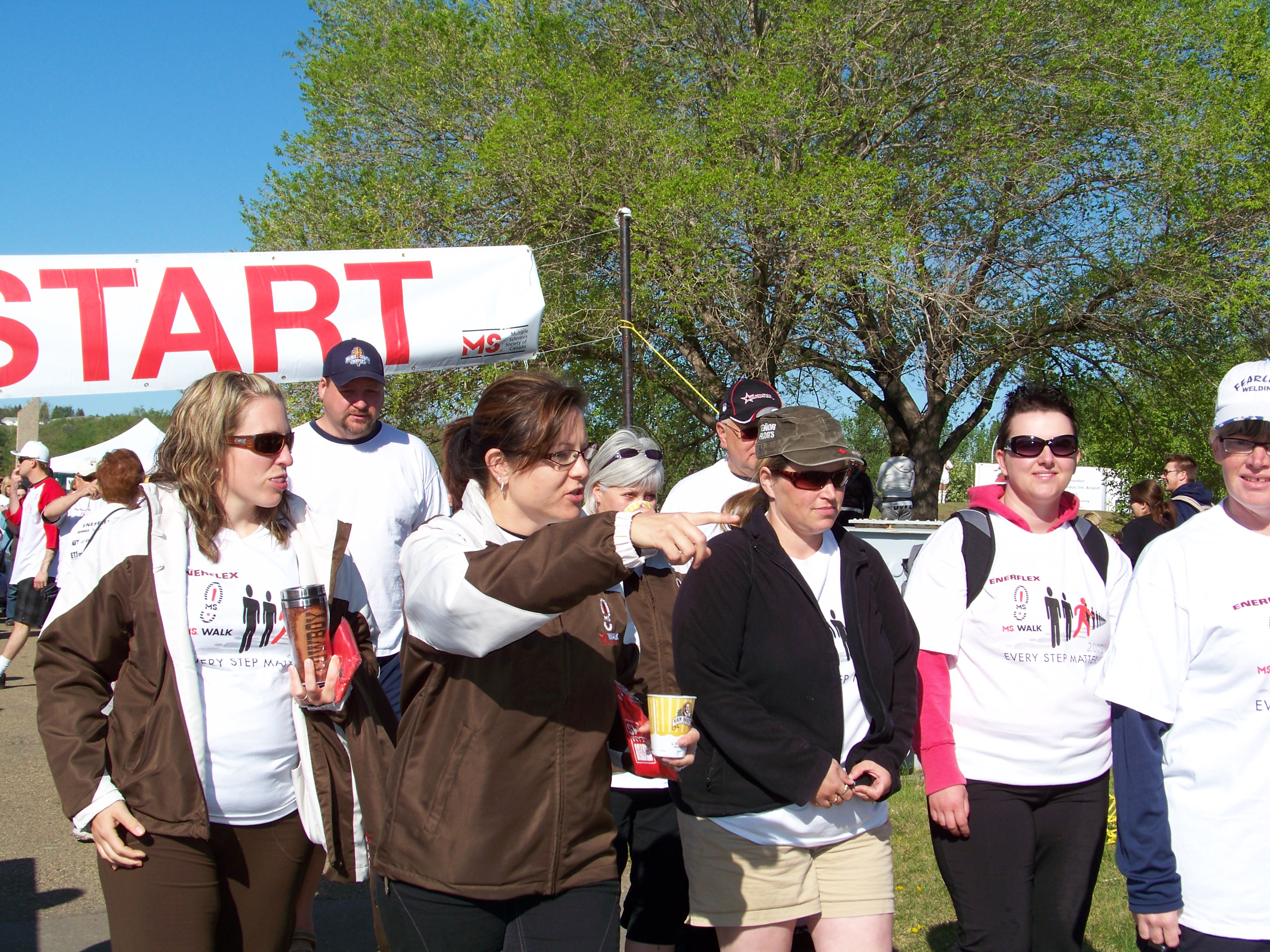
2009 Enerflex MS Walk - Edmonton

All MS Walks (now called Walk MS events) have common elements: food, entertainment, fundraising prizes and rest stops. Each event location has routes of varying length and difficulty and at least one that is wheelchair accessible. The MS Walks are designed to be events that encourage people with MS to participate in one form or another. The MS Walks are known for being well organized, logistically sound events.

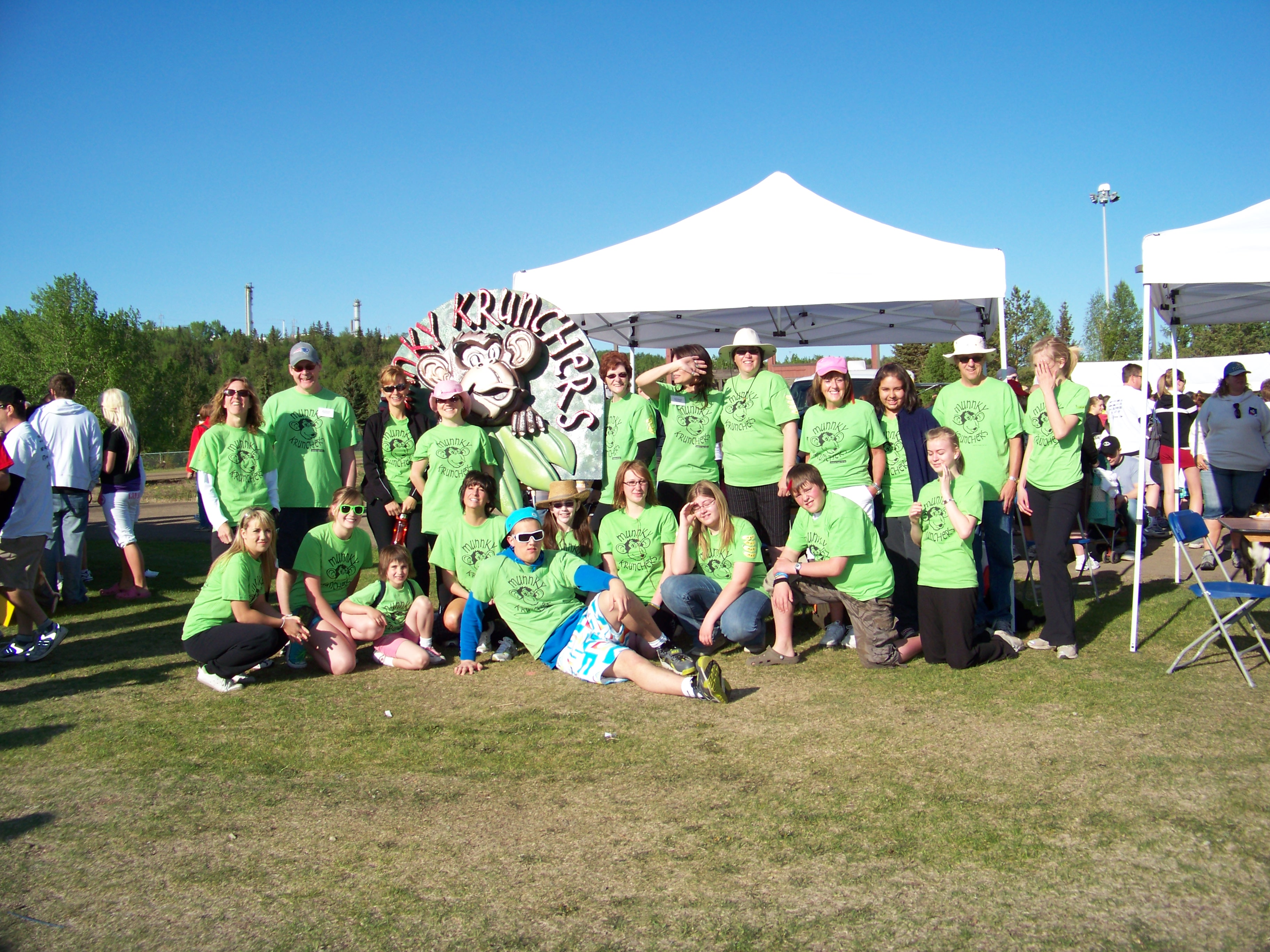

Walkers can register as an individual or as part of a team. However, the MS Society actively encourages walkers to register as a team, so they can experience the camaraderie of walking with a group of people all working towards a common goal. Teams can consist of family, friends, co-workers, hockey buddies, book club members, etc. Many teams across the country show team spirit by representing their team with t-shirts, temporary tattoos, flags and costumes.

The Society has staff dedicated to help teams achieve success. Staff help with:

- establishing team plans and activities
- registering teams
- setting recruitment and fundraising goals

All registered walkers are highly encouraged to commit to a minimum fundraising goal, however, due to the physical and financial limitations created by MS the focus is participation and community action. The MS Society provides several tools to ensure that walkers achieve their goals, including a personal online fundraising website where participants can email potential donors, receive online pledges, post photos, and share their stories.

Volunteers are crucial to the success of the MS Walks. For those who are unable to walk, or would prefer to help out in another way, there are many volunteer opportunities available. Some of the many opportunities include: organizing committees, checkpoint help, start/finish line volunteers, and food attendants.
