= Sylvia Lawry =

Sylvia Lawry (née: Friedman; born in Brooklyn, New York, June 28, 1915) was a social campaigner on behalf of people with multiple sclerosis. She founded the National Multiple Sclerosis Society (United States) in 1947 and co-founded the Multiple Sclerosis International Federation in the same year.

Lawry was at university studying law when her brother Bernard Friedman was diagnosed with multiple sclerosis. The family's experience prompted Lawry to place an advert in The New York Times seeking others affected by the disease. She received 50 replies. Recognising the need for more research and information, she brought together 20 prominent research scientists and went on to form the National Multiple Sclerosis Society.

In 1965 Lawry called a meeting in Vienna, Austria, to persuade more countries to join the Multiple Sclerosis International Federation. She was joined by Shirley Temple Black, who was also a campaigner for those affected by multiple sclerosis. The meeting was tense and there was some uncertainty in the room. The turning point came when Shirley Temple Black stood up:

'She looked around the room, making eye contact with many of the delegates. Then she asked, "What have you got to lose?" There really was no risk, she argued, financial or otherwise. "We're all here for the same reason," she insisted, "and that's to wipe out multiple sclerosis."

Bernard Friedman died of MS-related causes in 1973. Lawry knew that there were many other people with multiple sclerosis who needed help. She worked with Senator Charles Tobey of New Hampshire, whose daughter had MS, to lobby Congress. Eventually she and Tobey persuaded them to adopt legislation establishing what is now the National Institute of Neurological Disorders and Stroke (NINDS).

Lawry died on February 24, 2001.
