= George Webster (actor) =

British actor (born 1991)

- Born: 28 July 1991 (age 34); Eastbourne, England
- Occupations: Actor, director
- Years active: 2012–present
- Known for: My Name Is Emily; Versailles

George Webster (born 28 July 1991) is an English actor and filmmaker. On television, he is known for his roles in the E4 miniseries Tripped (2015), the Canal+ series Versailles (2017), and the Paramount+ series The Doll Factory (2023). His films include My Name Is Emily (2015).

Webster has also directed two films: the short film The Punisher: Dead of Night (2012) and the British comedy Further Ed (2017).

== Career ==
After starting out studying film making and directing various short films, he made the transition into acting and has since been seen in Jamie Patterson's City of Dreamers (2012) and Danny Boyle's series Babylon (2014) and the ITV series Autopsy: The Last Hours Of as the late River Phoenix before landing his first major role in Simon Fitzmaurice's My Name Is Emily in September 2014. Soon after, he was cast as a lead in E4's sci-fi comedy TV mini-series Tripped opposite Blake Harrison. In late 2015, he joined the cast of Simon Mirren's series Versailles as Prince William III of Orange and worked with Ron Howard on the National Geographic series Genius where he played the recurring role of Julius Winteler.

== Filmography ==
=== Film ===
Year	Film	Role	Director	Notes
2012	Batman: A Knight to Remember	The Joker	N/A	Also writer and director
2012	City of Dreamers	Kyle		
2012	The Underdog in the Red Dress	Robbie		Short film
2012	Kharon			Short film
2014	Blood Moon	Henry Lester		
2014	Blind Date	Charlie		
2015	My Name Is Emily	Arden		
2015	The Brighton Mob	Will		
2015	Phometrica	Cinema Pianist		
2016	Trial by Fire	Tim		Short film
2016	Ramona & The Chair	Lou		Short film
2016	The Fall of the Krays	The Author		
2017	Further Ed	Mikey Cyprus		Also writer and director
2017	Megan Leavey	Finn		Uncredited
2022	God's Petting You	Charlie		

=== Television ===
Year	Title	Role	Notes
2014	Babylon	Local P.C	1.03 "Episode 3"
2014	Autopsy: The Last Hours of...	River Phoenix	3.01 "River Phoenix"
2015	Tripped	Milo	Television miniseries
2015–2017	Versailles	William of Orange	4 episodes
2016	The Last Dragonslayer	Sir Grifflon	Television film
2017	Genius	Julius Winteler	3 episodes
2018	Wars	Boone Maverick	
2019	The Stand Up Sketch Show	Performer	1.01 Series 1, Episode 1
2020	Father Brown	Benjamin Milton	Series 8, Episode 8
2020	Industry	William Hunt	1 episode
2021	Finding Alice	George	
2022	Wedding Season	Hugo Delaney	Recurring role
2023	Unicorn: Warriors Eternal	Winston	Voice role
2023	The Doll Factory	Louis Frost	Main role
2024	Masters of the Air	Lt. Glenn W. Dye	

== Writing credits ==
Production	Notes	Broadcaster/Distributor
The Punisher: Dead of Night	Short film (also director, 2012)	YouTube
Batman: A Knight to Remember	Short film (also director, 2012)	YouTube
Further Ed	Feature film (also director, 2017)	Indy Wolf Pictures; Jump Start Productions
