= Multiple Sclerosis International Federation =

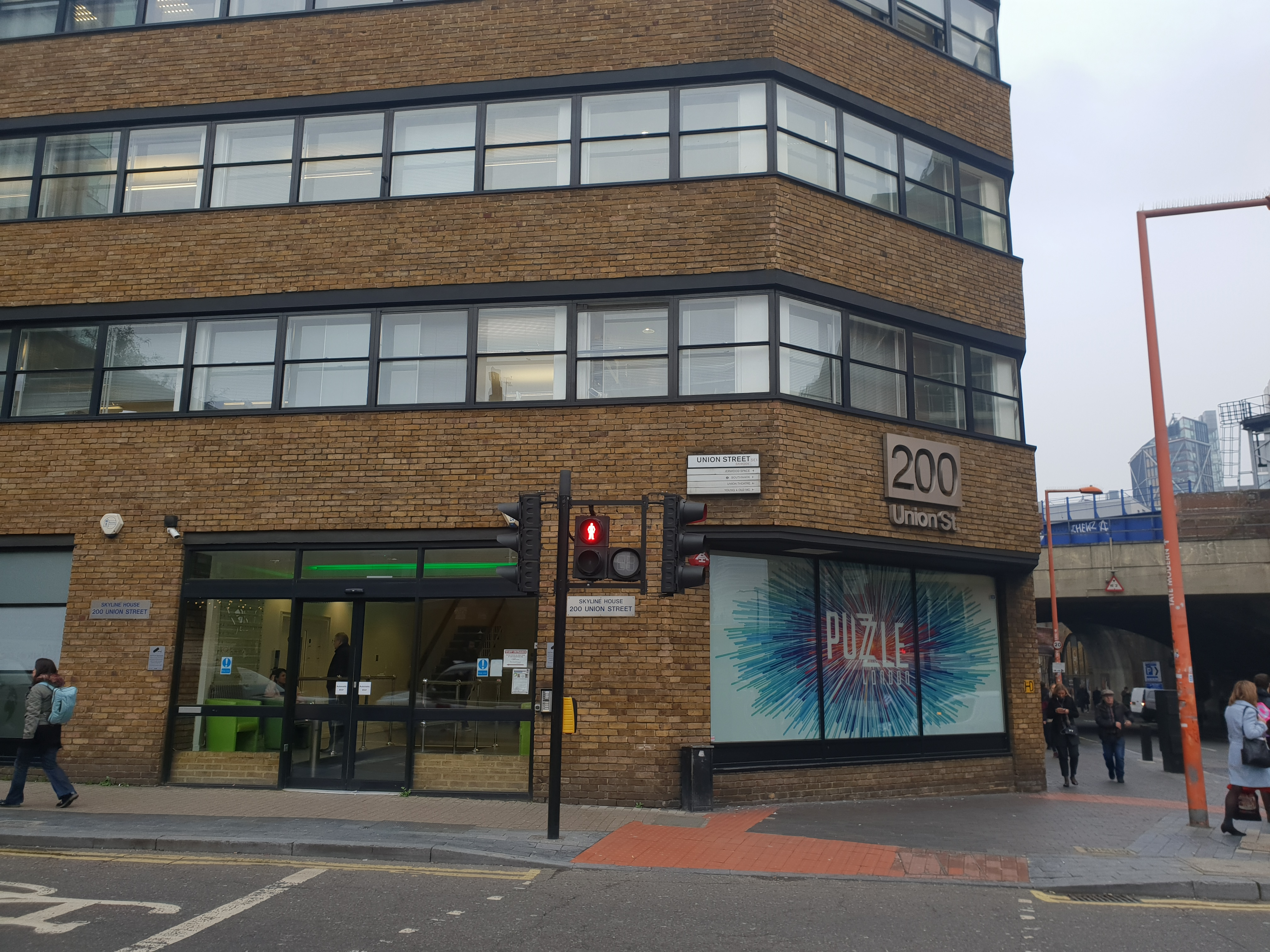
Building of Multiple Sclerosis International Federation

The Multiple Sclerosis International Federation (MSIF) was established in 1967 as an international body linking the activities of various national MS societies. The federation seeks to partner with member societies and the international scientific community to eliminate multiple sclerosis and its consequences, and to advocate for those affected by multiple sclerosis.

MSIF has the following key priorities:

- International research
- Development of new and existing societies
- Exchange of information
- Advocacy

== History ==
Since its establishment in 1967, MSIF has grown to link the work of 48 member MS societies worldwide. MSIF is in touch with many other emerging societies, and aims to support all MS societies in their development. MSIF has a budget of around £2 million per year, with most funding coming from member societies, charitable foundations and fundraising campaigns. Around a quarter of its income comes from the health care industry.

In cooperation with the World Health Organization, MSIF has published the most extensive source of global data about the epidemiology of MS, the Atlas of MS. The most recent edition of the Atlas of MS was published in 2020, and shows that there are 2.8 million people living with MS globally.

MSIF supports the International Pediatric MS Study Group (IPMSSG) - a group of medical professionals from all continents working to improve the treatment of children with MS, and to undertake international research into childhood MS.

In 2020, in response to the COVID-19 pandemic, MSIF gathered MS research experts and clinicians from around the world to produce global COVID-19 advice for people with MS. This has been updated at various intervals throughout the pandemic as new evidence has emerged. MSIF collaborated with the MS Data Alliance to establish the COVID-19 and MS Global Data Sharing Initiative. This collected data on how the coronavirus impacted people with MS and the results informed the global COVID-19 advice for people with MS.

== World Multiple Sclerosis Day ==
Since May 2009, MSIF has organized a World Multiple Sclerosis Day, which is now supported by MS organizations and individuals in around 100 countries. The purpose of the day is to raise awareness of MS as a global issue and make changes in the lives of people with MS. It is "A day to celebrate global solidarity and hope for the future"

World MS Day is officially marked on 30 May every year, though events and campaigns take place throughout the month of May.

The theme for World MS Day 2020-2022 is 'MS Connections'. The campaign focuses on building community connection, self-connection and connections to quality care.

The campaign tagline is ‘I Connect, We Connect’ and the campaign hashtag is #MSConnections.MS Connections challenges social barriers that leave people affected by MS feeling lonely and socially isolated. It is an opportunity to advocate for better services, celebrate support networks and champion self-care.
