= National Multiple Sclerosis Society =

American nonprofit organization

The National Multiple Sclerosis Society (NMSS) is an American nonprofit organization founded in 1946. It is dedicated to supporting individuals affected by multiple sclerosis (MS) and funding research to find a cure for the disease. It provides resources, support services, advocacy, and educational programs to improve the lives of people with MS, and their families.

== History ==
On March 11, 1946, Sylvia Lawry founded the Association for Advancement of Research on Multiple Sclerosis (now The National Multiple Sclerosis Society) in New York City. Lawry, a lawyer, was seeking a cure for her brother, Bernard, who had multiple sclerosis and she established the Association after realising that no foundation or organization existed to aid individuals with MS.

With chapters spanning the United States, the organization funds research, advocates for social and political change, offers educational resources, and sponsors services that help people with multiple sclerosis and their families. In 2016, Forbes ranked the organization 63rd among the 100 largest U.S. charities. In 2017, Charity Navigator awarded the organization three out of four stars for its performance.

== Research ==
The NMSS supports and funds research activities in early research, translational research that develops laboratory results into treatments, and clinical trials to find out whether they are effective in treating MS. In 2012, the Society invested $44 million in more than 350 new and ongoing projects.^{.} As of 2016, NMSS has raised $974 million for research^{[5]}.

Throughout two two-day meetings in 2014–2015, the NMSS developed the Wellness Research Working Group and wellness research priorities. The Research Wellness Group provides information regarding self-directed approaches for disease management to people diagnosed with multiple sclerosis.

Research rewards consist of several types of contributions to researchers in early to late stages of their careers. The following is a list of awards distributed by NMSS to researchers in 2017.

=== Research funding and grant programs ===
==== Career Transition Fellowship ====
The Career Transition Fellowship program sponsors postdoctoral training and research funding for scientists who demonstrate a dedication to MS research. Awards are in amounts up to $550,000 for a total of five years of training and research. The training period covers two years and research funding covers three additional years for research in a new faculty position.

==== Collaborative MS Research Center Awards ====
The NMSS offers funding to research centers with the intent to promote interaction among researchers. The Collaborative MS Research Center Awards program is intended to create collaboration between MS researchers, including independent investigators, and clinical research organizations. In addition, the program reaches out to professionals working in other fields of research to recruit them into MS research projects.

MS Research Center Awards are obtained through an application process through the NMSS MS Grants web page.

==== Fast Forward commercial/drug development ====
Fast Forward is a commercial research funding entity under the NMSS which provides funding for drug development and MS research being conducted through commercial entities such as EMD Pharmaceuticals, the University of Cambridge, the University of Edinburgh, and others. Researchers interested in the program are able to apply for funding through the Commercial Funding Opportunities web page.

==== Daniel Haughton Senior Faculty Award ====
This award was named after a member of the Board of Directors of the NMSS. Its purpose was to provide funding for training of MS researchers who needed additional education regarding the disease. As of 2017, this award was on hold and not accepting applications.

==== Harry Weaver Neuroscience Scholarships ====
Harry Weaver was a researcher in the field of neuroscience who had a dedication to MS research. He was the Director of Research at NMSS from 1966 to 1977. The scholarship in his name is offered to provide salary and research funding for a period of five years to researchers who are beginning their careers in MS research. The program is most often supported through universities.

==== Health Care Delivery and Policy Contracts ====
The Health Care Delivery and Policy Research (HCDPR) program funds investigators who are conducting research projects which address NMSS organization's priorities. These priorities are listed by the NMSS as funding, quality, outcomes, and costs for care related to MS.

==== International Progressive MS Alliance ====
The International Progressive MS Alliance was founded in 2012 as the International Progressive MS Collaborative. The MS Alliance membership is composed of MS organizations from around the world. The Alliance provides two different funding awards, including the Challenge Award and Collaborative Network Award grants. Both grants provide funding over multiple years to researchers and institutions in the international community.

==== Mentor-based Postdoctoral Rehabilitation ====
This program supports a combination of mentors and MS postdoctoral training institutions to recruit and train MS rehabilitation fellows. Mentors are required to be experienced MS researchers who have an established and active participation in their field. Interested parties must submit an application for the program through the NMSS website.

Participants in the program include the Duke University School of Medicine, the Weizmann Institute of Science, University of Colorado Anschutz Medical Campus, University of Utah, and additional related institutions.

==== Clinician Scientist Development Award ====
The American Academy of Neurology and NMSS have partnered to develop this grant program. The program focuses on providing grant funding to MS researchers. In 2016, the American Academy of Neuroscience Clinician Scientist Development Program awarded $3 million to research and training programs with a focus on neuroscience.

==== Pilot Research Grants ====
High-risk pilot research programs focus on cutting-edge ideas and methods that have not been tested and may contribute to MS medical research. The Pilot Research Grants provide one year of research funding to pilot programs in order to develop results which can be used to apply for long term funding programs.
