= National Register of Historic Places listings in Rowan County, North Carolina =

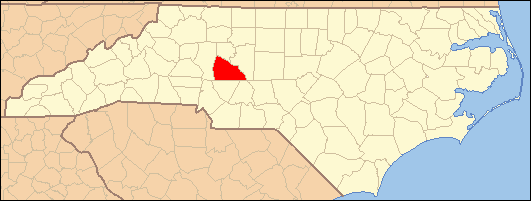

This list includes properties and districts listed on the National Register of Historic Places in Rowan County, North Carolina. Click the "Map of all coordinates" link to the right to view an online map of all properties and districts with latitude and longitude coordinates in the table below.

== Current listings ==
This National Park Service list is complete through NPS recent listings posted December 12, 2025.

	Name on the Register	Image	Date listed	Location	City or town	Description
1	Back Creek Presbyterian Church and Cemetery	Back Creek Presbyterian Church and Cemetery	December 29, 1983 (#83003998)	2145 NC 801 Hwy; 35°39′03″N 80°42′24″W	Mt. Ulla	
2	Barber Farm		January 15, 2003 (#02001717)	225 Redmon Rd. 35°42′57″N 80°38′42″W	Cleveland	
3	Bernhardt House	Bernhardt House	June 11, 1992 (#92000701)	305 E. Innes St. 35°39′54″N 80°28′04″W	Salisbury	
4	George Matthias Bernhardt House		November 26, 1982 (#82001303)	South of Rockwell on SR 2361; 35°30′27″N 80°25′42″W	Rockwell	
5	Henry Connor Bost House		November 12, 1982 (#82001304)	East of Woodleaf off U.S. Route 601; 35°46′01″N 80°30′45″W	South River	
6	Boyden High School	Boyden High School	May 23, 1996 (#96000564)	500 Lincolnton Rd. 35°39′53″N 80°29′05″W	Salisbury	After desegregation, school name changed to Salisbury High.
7	Michael Braun House	Michael Braun House	September 28, 1971 (#71000618)	Northwest of Granite Quarry on SR 2308 off U.S. Route 52; 35°37′20″N 80°26′28″W	Granite Quarry	
8	Brooklyn-South Square Historic District	Brooklyn-South Square Historic District	July 5, 1985 (#85001449)	Roughly bounded by Fisher, Shaver, Walls, and Lee Sts. 35°39′49″N 80°28′08″W	Salisbury	
9	Ella Brown Cannon House	Ella Brown Cannon House	August 24, 2021 (#100006854)	202 South Fulton St. 35°40′09″N 80°28′28″W	Salisbury	
10	Maxwell Chambers House	Maxwell Chambers House	January 20, 1972 (#72000992)	116 S. Jackson St. 35°40′09″N 80°28′20″W	Salisbury	
11	China Grove Roller Mill	China Grove Roller Mill	December 29, 1983 (#83003995)	308 N. Main St. 35°34′16″N 80°34′41″W	China Grove	
12	Christ Episcopal Church	Christ Episcopal Church	December 5, 2011 (#11000623)	3430 Old U.S. Route 70; 35°43′59″N 80°39′55″W	Cleveland	
13	City Motor Company		December 7, 2022 (#100008465)	419 South Main St. 35°39′51″N 80°28′25″W	Salisbury	
14	Community Building	Community Building	March 5, 1970 (#70000468)	200 N. Main St. 35°40′06″N 80°28′07″W	Salisbury	Now home to the Rowan Museum
15	Corriher Grange Hall		September 23, 1982 (#82003507)	Northwest of Five Points on SR 1555; 35°36′04″N 80°41′43″W	Enochville	
16	Cleveland School		January 10, 2019 (#100003300)	216 Krider St. 35°44′06″N 80°40′09″W	Cleveland	
17	East Spencer Graded School	East Spencer Graded School	January 25, 2018 (#100002050)	110 S. Long St. 35°40′59″N 80°26′00″W	East Spencer	
18	Eastover		January 24, 2011 (#10001176)	5510 S. Main St. 35°36′31″N 80°32′28″W	Salisbury	
19	Ellis Street Graded School Historic District	Ellis Street Graded School Historic District	March 5, 1999 (#99000273)	Roughly bounded by Craig, Innes, Jackson, and Cemetery Sts. 35°40′20″N 80°28′14″W	Salisbury	Comprises the Shober Bridge and 76 other contributing properties
20	John Fisher House		December 10, 2024 (#100011162)	3850 East Ridge Road; 35°43′29″N 80°26′05″W	Salisbury vicinity	
21	Fulton Heights Historic District	Fulton Heights Historic District	March 25, 1999 (#99000394)	Roughly bounded by Fulton St., Heilig Ave., Ridge Ave., and Boyden St. 35°39′40″N 80°29′25″W	Salisbury	
22	Grace Evangelical and Reformed Church	Grace Evangelical and Reformed Church	January 20, 1972 (#72000990)	South of Rockwell on SR 1221; 35°31′15″N 80°25′17″W	Rockwell	
23	Granite Quarry School		February 7, 2001 (#01000017)	706 Dunn's Mountain Rd. 35°36′57″N 80°26′07″W	Granite Quarry	
24	Griffith-Sowers House		September 9, 2009 (#09000703)	5050 Statesville Boulevard; 35°42′50″N 80°34′07″W	Salisbury	
25	Grimes Mill	Grimes Mill	February 6, 1984 (#84002492)	600 N. Church St. 35°40′22″N 80°27′56″W	Salisbury	Destroyed by fire on 1/16/13.
26	Grubb-Sigmon-Weisiger House	Grubb-Sigmon-Weisiger House	February 12, 1999 (#99000198)	213 McCoy Rd. 35°41′15″N 80°30′06″W	Salisbury	
27	Hall Family House	Hall Family House	October 5, 1982 (#82001305)	9935 NC 801 Hwy; 35°40′54″N 80°39′52″W	Bear Poplar	
28	Hambley-Wallace House	Hambley-Wallace House	December 15, 1997 (#97001545)	508 S. Fulton St. 35°39′59″N 80°28′42″W	Salisbury	
29	Archibald Henderson Law Office	Archibald Henderson Law Office	January 20, 1972 (#72000993)	Church and Fisher Sts. 35°40′03″N 80°28′20″W	Salisbury	On the property of Rowan Public Library – Headquarters.
30	J. C. Price High School	J. C. Price High School	April 21, 2010 (#10000208)	1300-1400 W. Bank St. 35°40′36″N 80°29′07″W	Salisbury	
31	Kerr Mill	Kerr Mill	May 11, 1976 (#76001337)	550 Sloan Rd. 35°31′11″N 80°25′21″W	Mill Bridge	
32	Gen. William Kerr House	Gen. William Kerr House	September 23, 1982 (#82003505)	Northwest of Enochville on SR 1353; 35°32′49″N 80°43′29″W	Enochville	
33	Kesler Manufacturing Co.-Cannon Mills Co. Plant No. 7 Historic District	Kesler Manufacturing Co.-Cannon Mills Co. Plant No. 7 Historic District	June 20, 1985 (#85001346)	Park Ave. and Martin Luther King, Jr. Ave. 35°40′35″N 80°27′44″W	Salisbury	
34	Knox Farm Historic District		April 1, 1983 (#83001914)	Knox and Amity Hill Rds. 35°43′01″N 80°44′49″W	Cleveland	
35	Knox-Johnstone House		August 5, 1993 (#93000737)	100 Beaumont Farm Rd. 35°44′01″N 80°40′58″W	Cleveland	
36	Livingstone College Historic District	Livingstone College Historic District	May 27, 1982 (#82003509)	W. Monroe St. 35°40′14″N 80°28′59″W	Salisbury	A boundary change was approved September 2, 2025.
37	Alexander Long House		February 1, 1972 (#72000995)	North of Spencer on Sowers Ferry Rd. 35°42′38″N 80°25′14″W	Spencer	
38	Lyerly Building for Boys		January 5, 1989 (#88003006)	Crescent Rd./Rt. 3; 35°34′12″N 80°25′47″W	Gold Hill Township	
39	Napoleon Bonaparte McCanless House	Napoleon Bonaparte McCanless House	May 22, 2014 (#14000264)	619 S. Main St. 35°39′45″N 80°28′33″W	Salisbury	
40	Walter McCanless House	Walter McCanless House	May 21, 2005 (#05000452)	200 Confederate Ave. 35°40′59″N 80°28′08″W	Salisbury	
41	McNeely-Strachan House	McNeely-Strachan House	February 1, 1972 (#72000994)	226 S. Jackson St. 35°40′04″N 80°28′27″W	Salisbury	
42	Monroe Street School	Monroe Street School	May 19, 2004 (#04000463)	1100 W. Monroe St. 35°40′24″N 80°29′06″W	Salisbury	
43	Mount Vernon		May 27, 1980 (#80002899)	SR 1003 and 1986; 35°47′18″N 80°38′40″W	Woodleaf	
44	Mount Zion Baptist Church	Mount Zion Baptist Church	December 30, 1985 (#85003188)	413 N. Church St. 35°40′15″N 80°28′02″W	Salisbury	
45	North Long Street-Park Avenue Historic District	North Long Street-Park Avenue Historic District	June 20, 1985 (#85001347)	N. Long St. and Park Ave. 35°40′00″N 80°27′41″W	Salisbury	
46	North Main Street Historic District	North Main Street Historic District	July 29, 1985 (#85001674)	Roughly bounded by N. Main, 17th, Lee, and Lafayette Sts. 35°40′33″N 80°27′25″W	Salisbury	
47	Owen-Harrison House		July 21, 1983 (#83001911)	1420 Sloan Rd. 35°39′10″N 80°39′37″W	Mill Bridge	
48	John Phifer Farm		December 28, 1990 (#90001991)	Junction of Phifer Rd. and SR 1978; 35°46′48″N 80°43′24″W	Cleveland	
49	John E. and Jean Anne Ferrier Ramsay, Sr. House		April 15, 2025 (#100011661)	16 Pine Tree Road; 35°41′03″N 80°27′54″W	Salisbury	
50	John Carlyle and Anita Sherrill House	John Carlyle and Anita Sherrill House	September 1, 2009 (#09000704)	14175 NC 801 Hwy; 35°39′31″N 80°43′52″W	Mount Ulla	
51	Rankin-Sherrill House	Rankin-Sherrill House	September 23, 1982 (#82003508)	14125 NC 801 Hwy; 35°39′27″N 80°43′41″W	Mt. Ulla	
52	St. Andrew's Episcopal Church and Cemetery		August 19, 1982 (#82003510)	Northeast of Woodleaf on SR 1950; 35°47′14″N 80°33′44″W	Woodleaf	
53	Salisbury Historic District		November 12, 1975 (#75001289)	Roughly bounded by Jackson, Innes, Caldwell, Marsh, Church, E. Bank, Lee, and Liberty Sts.; also 117 S. Lee St.; also roughly bounded by Ellis St., Monroe St., Church St., Bank St., S. Main St., and McCubbins St.; also portions of E. Council, E. Innes, Lee, and E. Liberty Sts. between Main and Depot Sts. 35°40′04″N 80°28′10″W	Salisbury	Legislative center of the historic Salisbury District. Second, third, and fourth sets of boundaries represent boundary increases of January 6, 1988, July 6, 1989, and July 20, 2000 respectively
54	Salisbury National Cemetery	Salisbury National Cemetery	April 12, 1999 (#99000393)	202 Government Rd. 35°39′37″N 80°28′27″W	Salisbury	
55	Salisbury Railroad Corridor Historic District	Salisbury Railroad Corridor Historic District	May 13, 1987 (#86003460)	Roughly East Council, Liberty, Kerr, Cemetery, Franklin, Lee, and Depot Sts.; also the 300 and 400 blocks of N. Lee St. 35°40′06″N 80°27′53″W	Salisbury	Second set of addresses represents a boundary increase of May 1, 2003
56	Salisbury Southern Railroad Passenger Depot	Salisbury Southern Railroad Passenger Depot	July 30, 1975 (#75001290)	Eastern side of Depot St. between Kerr and Council Sts. 35°40′02″N 80°27′58″W	Salisbury	
57	Salisbury VA Hospital Historic District		May 25, 2022 (#100007763)	1601 Brenner Ave. 35°41′02″N 80°29′23″W	Salisbury	
58	Shaver Rental Houses District	Shaver Rental Houses District	January 12, 1988 (#87002233)	303, 309, and 315 W. Council, and 120 N. Jackson; 35°40′12″N 80°28′17″W	Salisbury	
59	Shuping's Mill Complex		September 23, 1982 (#82003506)	South of Faith on NC 152; 35°33′04″N 80°29′00″W	Faith	Burned
60	Southern Railway Passenger Car Number 1211		April 12, 2022 (#100007594)	1 Samuel Spencer Dr. 35°41′18″N 80°26′03″W	Spencer	Owned and preserved by the North Carolina Transportation Museum
61	Southern Railway Spencer Shops	Southern Railway Spencer Shops	March 17, 1978 (#78001972)	Salisbury Ave. between 3rd and 8th Sts. 35°41′13″N 80°26′05″W	Spencer	
62	Spencer Historic District	Spencer Historic District	December 20, 1984 (#84000619)	Roughly bounded by N. to S. Salisbury Ave., 8th St., Whitehead Ave., and Jefferson St. 35°41′32″N 80°26′04″W	Spencer	
63	John Steele House	John Steele House	September 12, 1994 (#94001051)	1010 Richard St. 35°40′27″N 80°27′31″W	Salisbury	
64	John Stigerwalt House		December 20, 1984 (#84000595)	East of Kannapolis off SR 1221 (Old Beatty Ford Rd.); 35°31′06″N 80°31′00″W	Bostian Heights	
65	Edgar S. and Madge Temple House		April 26, 2021 (#100006463)	1604 Statesville Blvd. 35°41′32″N 80°30′20″W	Salisbury	
66	Third Creek Presbyterian Church and Cemetery		July 21, 1983 (#83001912)	SR 1973; 35°45′39″N 80°41′04″W	Cleveland	
67	Thyatira Presbyterian Church, Cemetery, and Manse	Thyatira Presbyterian Church, Cemetery, and Manse	February 17, 1984 (#84002488)	220 White Rd. 35°39′01″N 80°38′12″W	Mill Bridge	
68	Calvin H. Wiley School	Calvin H. Wiley School	October 20, 1988 (#88002028)	200 block of Ridge Ave. 35°39′46″N 80°29′12″W	Salisbury	School closed in 1983; became Wiley School Apartments in 1985.
69	Wood Grove	Wood Grove	September 23, 1982 (#82003504)	185 Cress Rd. 35°40′48″N 80°40′28″W	Bear Poplar	
70	Zion Lutheran Church	Zion Lutheran Church	January 20, 1972 (#72000991)	Southwest of Rockwell on SR 1006 off SR 1221; 35°31′40″N 80°27′00″W	Rockwell	

== Former listing ==
	Name on the Register	Image	Date listed	Date removed	Location	City or town	Description
1	Joseph H. Mingus Farm		October 29, 1987 (#87001551)	March 16, 1995	Southern side of SR 1947, northeast of its junction with SR 1702	Woodleaf	Delisted due to relocation of the farm for construction of the Rowan County Landfill.

== See also ==
- National Register of Historic Places listings in North Carolina
- List of National Historic Landmarks in North Carolina
