= Sigmon =

Sigmon is a surname. Notable people with the surname include:

- Brad Sigmon (1957–2025), American executed murderer
- Loyd Sigmon (1909–2004), American radio broadcaster

== See also ==
- Grubb–Sigmon–Weisiger House, a house in Salisbury, North Carolina
- Sigmond, people bearing that surname
