= McCanless =

McCanless is a Scottish surname. Notable people with the surname include:

- Hix McCanless (born 1868), American architect and civil engineer responsible for several historic buildings of Ennis, Ellis County, Texas
- Jim McCanless (born 1936), American football player
- Napoleon Bonaparte McCanless (1851–1920), American businessman, primarily in Salisbury and surrounding Rowan County, North Carolina
