= Senator Ramsey (disambiguation) =

Alexander Ramsey (1815–1903) was a U.S. Senator from Minnesota from 1863 to 1875. Senator Ramsey may also refer to:

- Ambrose Ramsey (died 1805), North Carolina State Senate
- Ben Ramsey (politician) (1903–1985), Texas State Senate
- Joseph H. Ramsey (1816–1894), New York State Senate
- Ron Ramsey (born 1955), Tennessee State Senate
- Ronald Ramsey Sr. (born 1959), Georgia State Senate
- James Graham Ramsay (1823–1903), North Carolina State Senate
