= Sigmond =

Sigmond is a surname. Notable people with the surname include:

- Aaron Sigmond, American author, editor and publisher
- Dick Sigmond (1897–1950), Dutch footballer
- Ellen Sigmond (born 1936), Norwegian geologist
- Jola Sigmond (born 1943), Hungarian-born Swedish architect
- Júlia Sigmond (1929–2020), Hungarian-Romanian puppet actor, Esperanto writer and editor
- Rianne Sigmond (born 1984), Dutch rower

== See also ==
- Sigismund, a masculine given name
