= Woodleaf =

Woodleaf may refer to:

- Woodleaf, Yuba County, California
- Woodleaf, North Carolina
