= Grimes Mill =

Grimes Mill may refer to:

- Grimes Mill, within Grimes House and Mill Complex, near Lexington, Kentucky, listed on the National Register of Historic Places (NRHP) in Fayette County
- Grimes Mill (Salisbury, North Carolina), NRHP-listed
