= Scotch Irish Township, Rowan County, North Carolina =

Township in Rowan County, North Carolina

Coordinates: 35.8023169°N 80.6659842°W

Scotch Irish Township
- Township
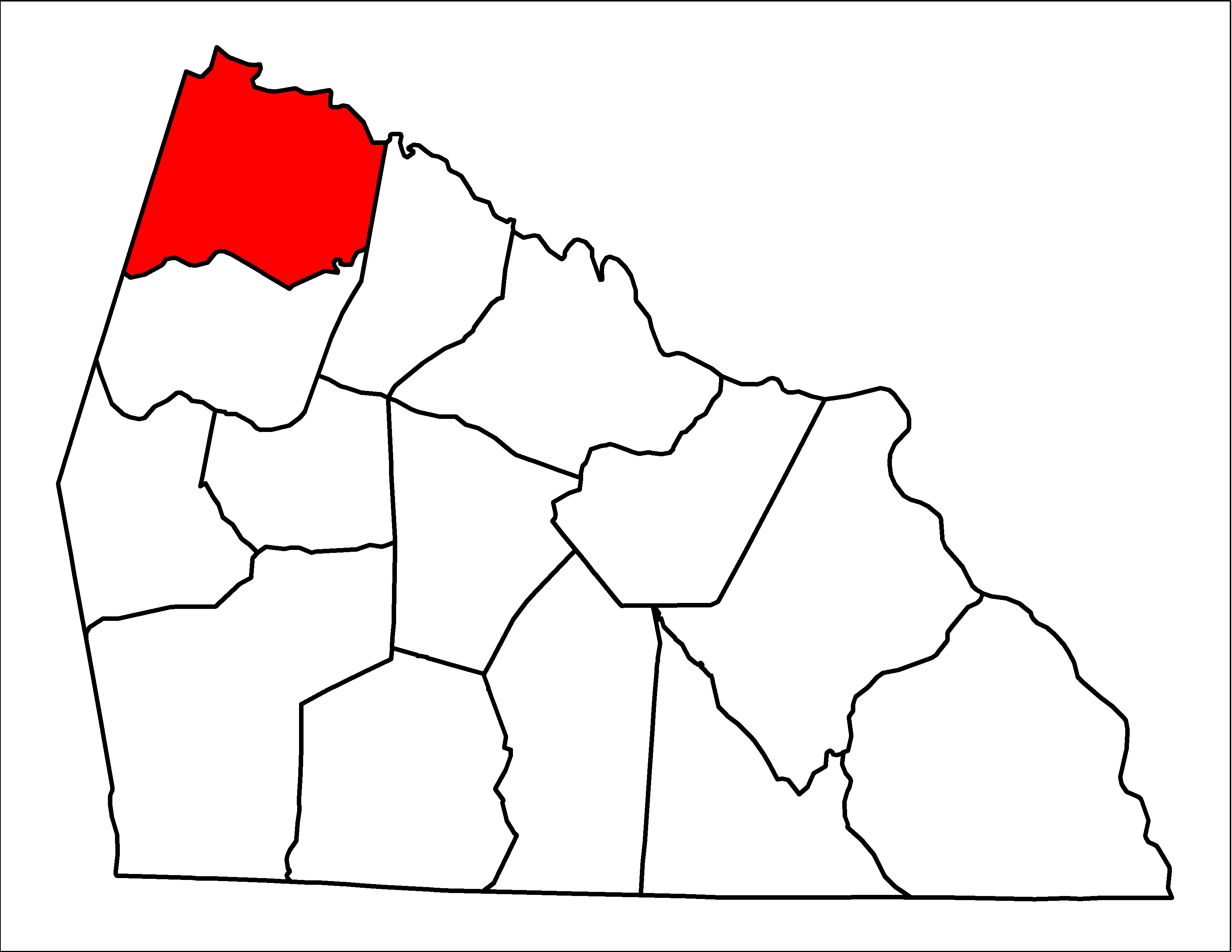
- Location of Scotch Irish Township in Rowan County

- Location within North Carolina Location within the United States
- Country: United States
- State: North Carolina
- County: Rowan
- Established in: 1868

Government
  - Type: non-functioning county subdivision
- Time zone: UTC-5 (Eastern (EST))
  - Summer (DST): UTC-4 (EDT)

Scotch Irish Township is one of fourteen townships in Rowan County, North Carolina, United States. The township had a population of 1,820 according to the 2010 census. By the requirements of the North Carolina Constitution of 1868, all counties in North Carolina were divided into townships.

Geographically, Scotch Irish Township occupies 35.22 square miles (91.2 km^{2}) in northwestern Rowan County. There are no incorporated municipalities in Scotch Irish Township. The township's northern boundary is the South Yadkin River and borders with Davie County and its western border is with Cool Springs Township, Iredell County.

Residents are served by the Rowan–Salisbury School System.

== Current and historical sites and people ==
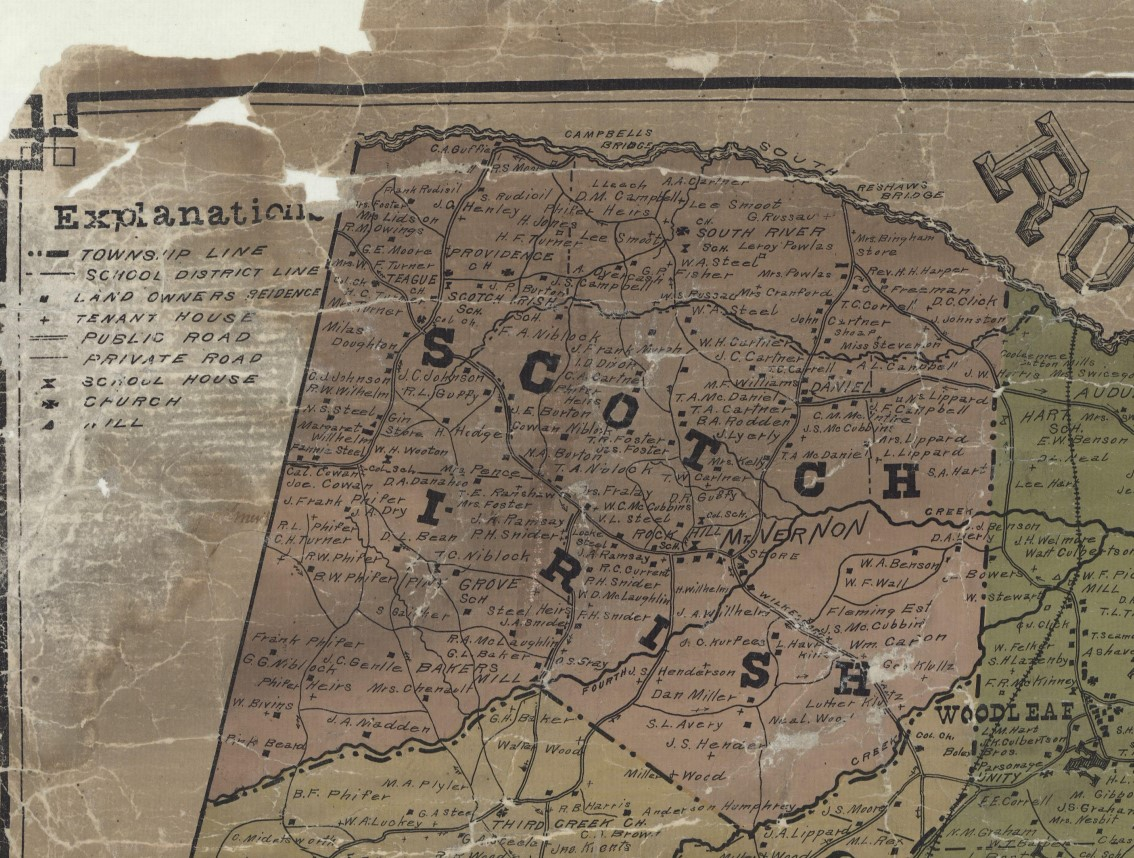
1903 map of the Scotch Irish Township

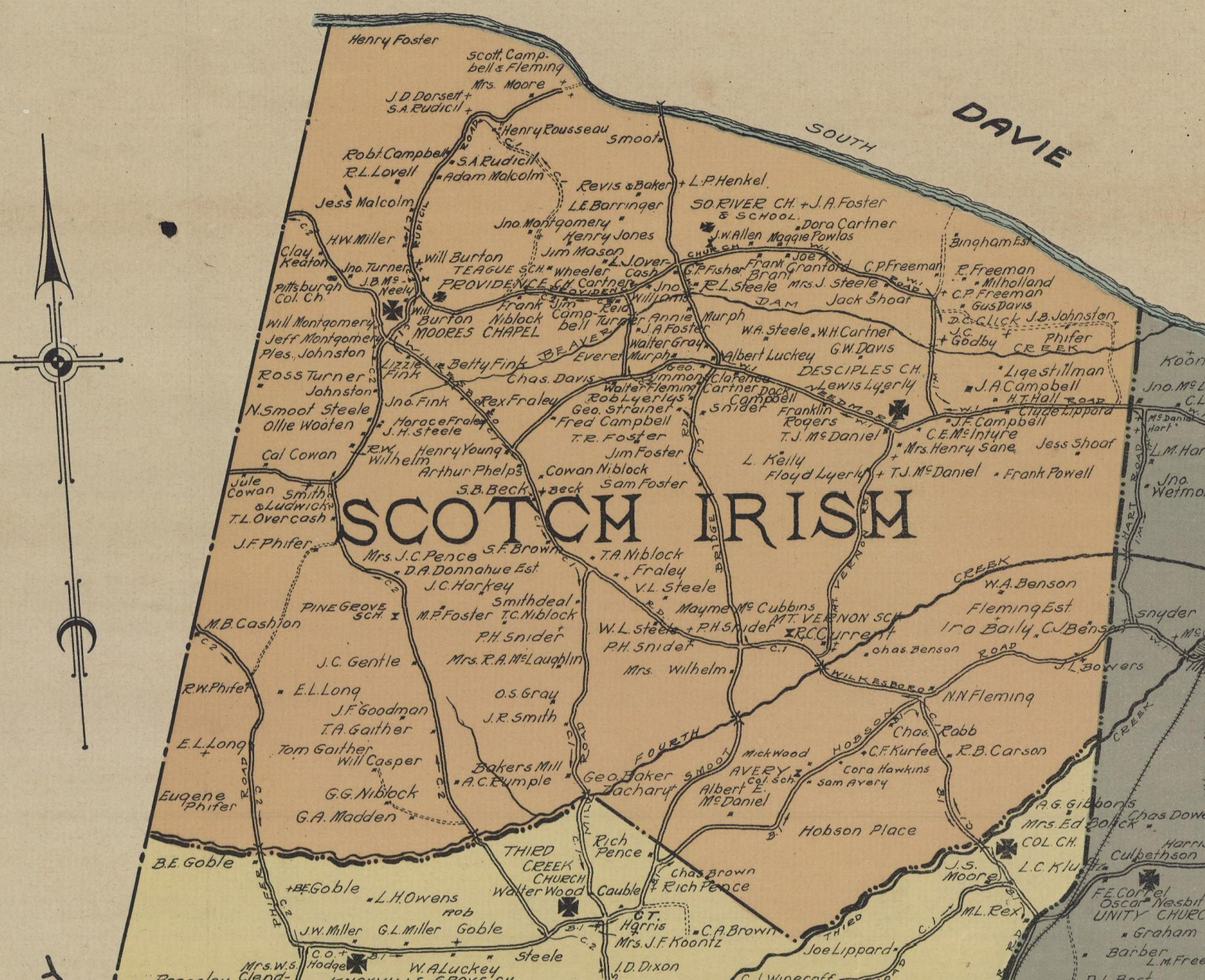
1930 map of Scotch Irish Township

The following sites are within Scotch Irish Township:

- Alpha Post Office, Carson A. Guffy postmaster, 6/19/1884 to 2/29/1904
- Baker's Mill
- Campbell's Bridge
- Desciples Church
- James Graham Ramsay, physician, farmer and North Carolina politician
- Keaton's Barbecue
- Moores Chapel
- Mount Vernon Plantation (historic plantation built in 1822)
- Piny Grove School
- Restoration Church
- Rock Hill School
- Scotch Irish School
- Teague School
- Village of Mt. Vernon
- Village of Pittsburg (first noted in 1882)
- South River Church and School

Township maps also depict several colored schools in Scotch Irish Township in 1903 and 1930. The Rowan Mills Post Office was used in the enumeration of residents of Scotch Irish Township in 1870.

== Adjacent townships ==
- Calahaln Township, Davie County – north
- Cleveland – south
- Cool Springs – west
- Turnersburg – northwest
- Unity – east
