= Pittsburg, North Carolina =

Unincorporated community in North Carolina, US

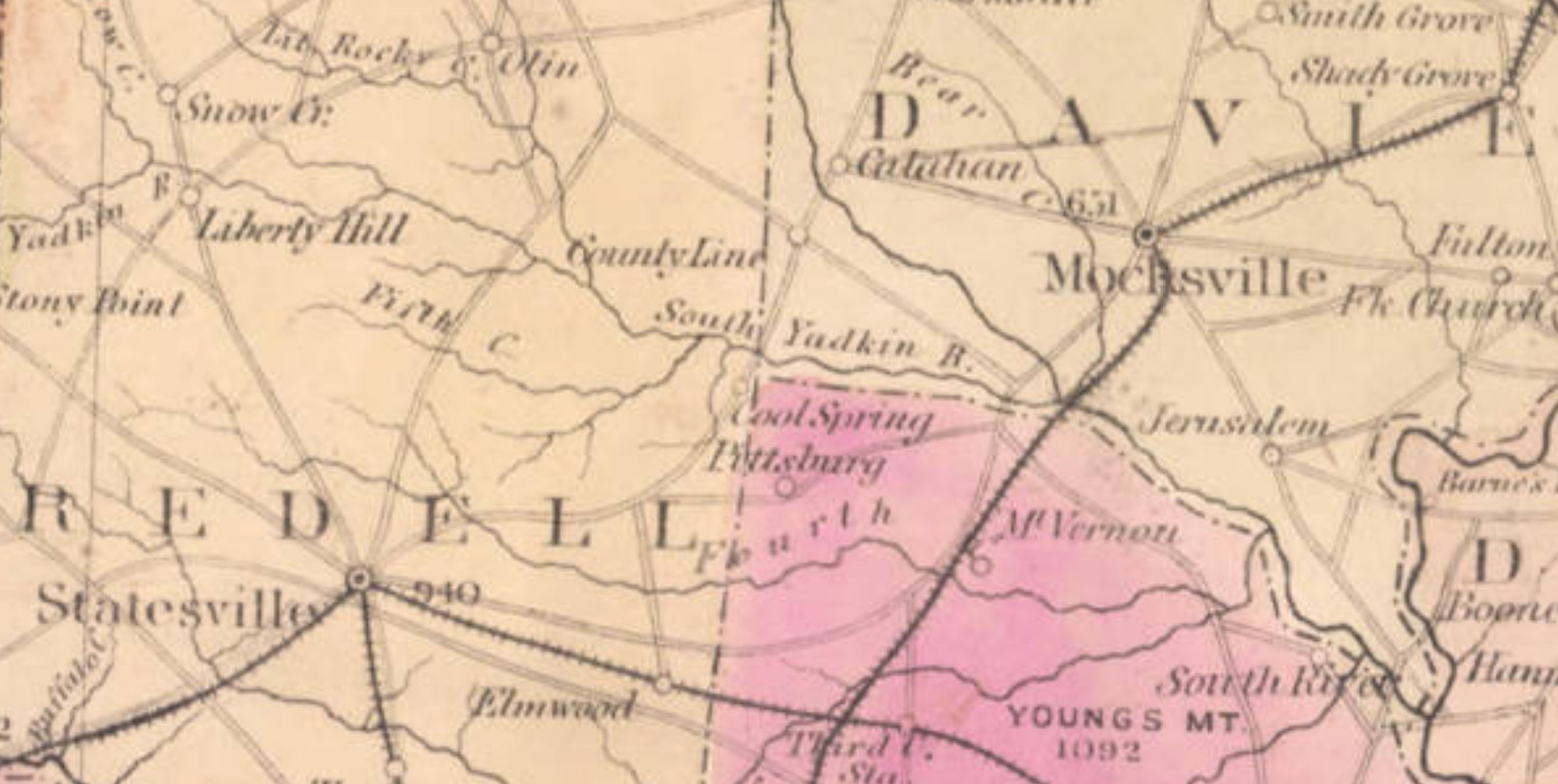
Location of Pittsburg in Rowan County, North Carolina, in 1882

Pittsburg, North Carolina, is an unincorporated community in Scotch Irish Township, Rowan County, North Carolina. It was named for the industrial heritage of Pittsburgh, Pennsylvania. It is located at 35°49′30″N 80°42′01″W with an elevation of 865 feet (264 m). It was first noted in an 1882 map of North Carolina by W.C. Kerr. Moore's Chapel African Methodist Episcopal Zion Church is located in Pittsburg.
