= Shober Bridge =

- U.S. Historic district – Contributing property
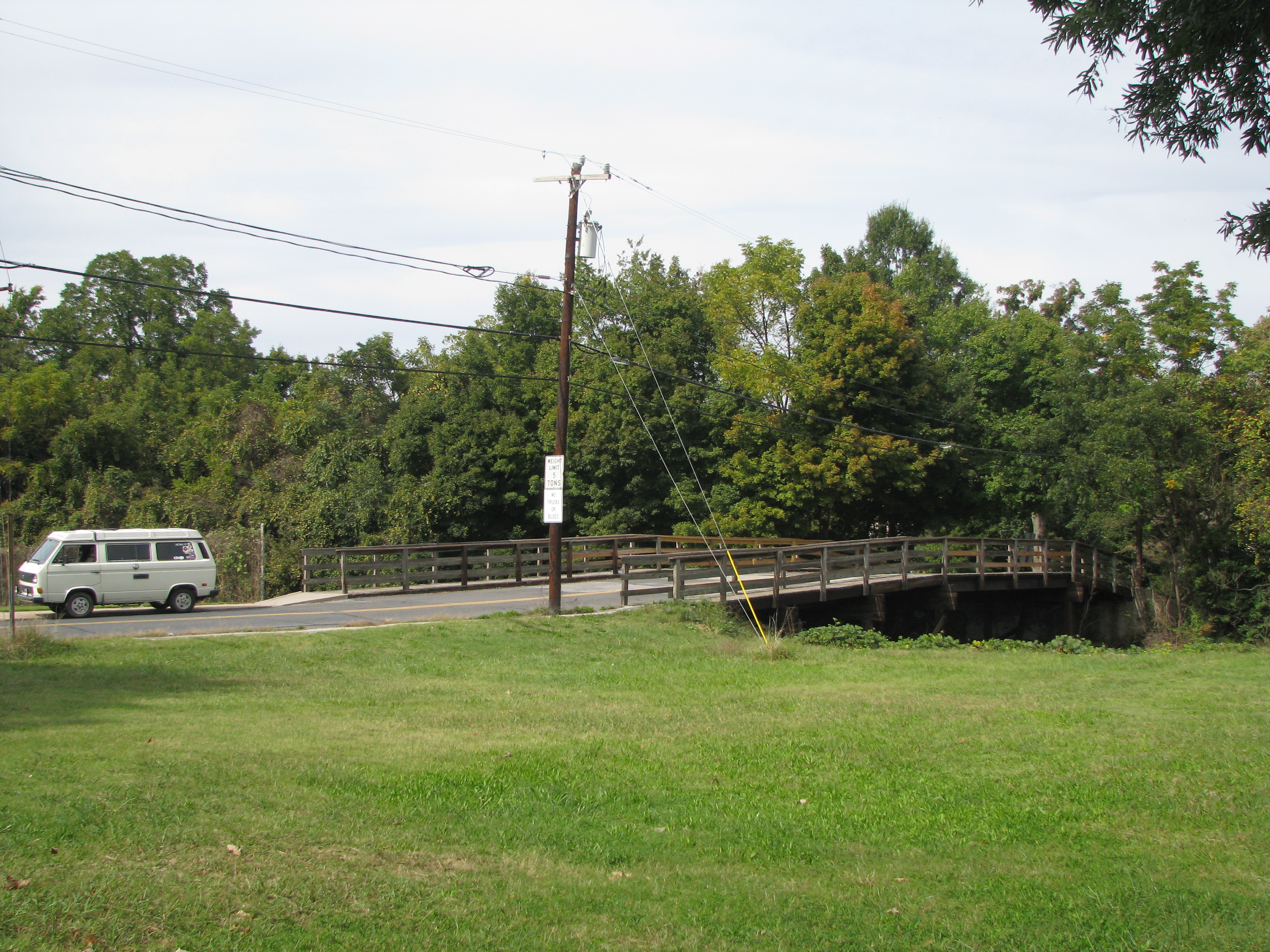

- Location within North Carolina Location within the United States
- Location: Ellis Street, Salisbury, North Carolina
- Coordinates: 35°40′26″N 80°28′14″W
- Architectural style: Humpback bridge
- Part of: Ellis Street Graded School Historic District (ID99000273)
- Designated CP: March 5, 1999

Shober Bridge is a historic humpback bridge carrying Ellis Street across the Norfolk Southern Railway in Salisbury, North Carolina, one of two timber bridges in the city. It has asphalt on top of a wooden deck and has needed replacement for many years. Currently, the Shober Bridge has a six-ton weight limit, meaning large trucks and emergency vehicles cannot use it. Historic Salisbury Foundation calls it "a contributing structure to the Ellis Street Graded School Historic District and ... a gateway entrance to Salisbury proper." It was named for Col. Francis Shober, who represented Salisbury in the United States Congress in the late 1860s. In 1999, the Shober Bridge was named to the National Register of Historic Places as part of the Ellis Street Graded School Historic District.

== History ==
The Western North Carolina Railroad opened in 1858 between Salisbury and Morganton. In 1896, Southern Railway Company (now Norfolk Southern) took over operation of the railroad. During the American Civil War, Gen. George Stoneman crossed the railroad where the bridge is now. By 1880, according to Norfolk Southern, a bridge had been built. Some sources say a bridge opened in 1858 and that Stoneman crossed it. Plans for a replacement bridge had been made by 1926, and the current bridge was apparently built between 1932 and 1944.

On February 9, 1962, four African-American children crossed the Shober Bridge on their way to integrating the all-white Frank B. John Elementary School.

In 1971, the state turned over the bridge to the city. By 1975, the city decided the bridge needed replacing. By 1985, the bridge was eligible for federal money to pay for 80 percent of its replacement cost. In 1996, the city wanted to build a new $1.4 million bridge west of the existing one as part of a major connector between Kerr Street and Mocksville Avenue. Area residents protested, since the plan would disrupt the historic district. The city agreed, and plans began for replacing the bridge at its existing location. In 2001, Norfolk Southern asked that the bridge be designed for three sets of tracks; the railroad had two tracks.

In January 2004, the new bridge was expected to be complete by 2005 or 2006.

By 2006, an engineer had a plan to upgrade the existing bridge.

On March 18, 2010 a letter to the Salisbury Post stated that the Historic Salisbury Foundation "strongly endorses and supports the proper rehabilitation of the historic Shober Bridge." That same day, the organization's director Jack Thomson told the City Council

[T]his bridge, nationally recognized and listed in the National Register of Historic Places, can be made safe for the vehicular traffic needs of the city of Salisbury through rehabilitation while continuing to contribute to the Ellis Street Historic District as a historic resource.

Many homes in Salisbury at the time displayed signs with the message "Rehab Historic Shober Bridge. This landmark is worth saving!"

Work has been done on the bridge in recent years, but a permanent fix is needed. In 2010, the city was supporting upgrading the bridge provided fire trucks could use it. Norfolk Southern rejected plans to upgrade the bridge, so the city decided to do nothing.
