= St. Andrew's Episcopal Church and Cemetery =

Historic site in Rowan County, North Carolina, US

- U.S. National Register of Historic Places
- Location within North Carolina Location within the United States
- Location: NE of Woodleaf on SR 1950, near Woodleaf, North Carolina
- Coordinates: 35°47′14″N 80°33′44″W
- Area: 3.5 acres (1.4 ha)
- Built: 1840
- Architect: Correll, Jacob
- Architectural style: Vernacular Meetinghouse
- NRHP reference No.: 82003510
- Added to NRHP: August 19, 1982

St. Andrew's Episcopal Church and Cemetery is a historic Episcopal church and cemetery located near Woodleaf, Rowan County, North Carolina, United States. It was built in 1840, and is a one-story. frame meetinghouse style building. It is sheathed in weatherboard and rests on a stone foundation. Adjacent to the church is the contributing cemetery with 53 inscribed markers. It is the oldest intact frame antebellum Episcopal church in North Carolina.

It was listed on the National Register of Historic Places in 1982.
