= North Long Street–Park Avenue Historic District =

Historic district in North Carolina, United States

- U.S. National Register of Historic Places
- U.S. Historic district
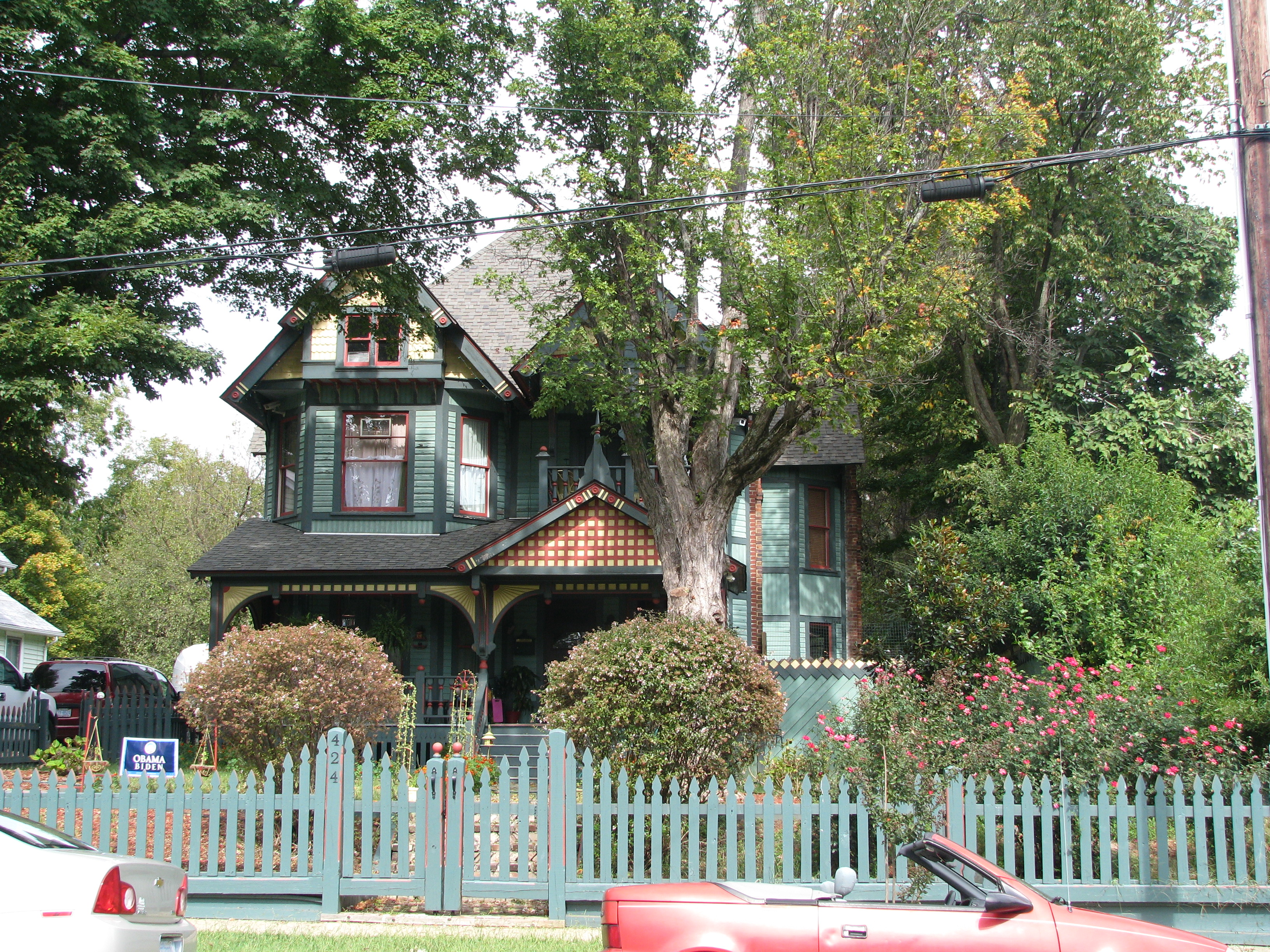
- McCubbins–McCanless–Clark House, September 2012

- Location within North Carolina Location within the United States
- Location: North Long St. and Park Ave., Salisbury, North Carolina
- Coordinates: 35°40′00″N 80°27′41″W
- Area: 10 acres (4.0 ha)
- Architect: Multiple
- Architectural style: Colonial Revival, Bungalow/craftsman, Gothic
- NRHP reference No.: 85001347
- Added to NRHP: June 20, 1985

North Long Street–Park Avenue Historic District is a national historic district located at Salisbury, Rowan County, North Carolina. The district encompasses 46 contributing buildings in a predominantly residential section of Salisbury. It was developed largely between about 1890 and 1925, and includes notable examples of Gothic Revival, Colonial Revival, and Bungalow / American Craftsman style. It was listed on the National Register of Historic Places in 1985.

Notable buildings include the McCubbins-McCanless-Clark House (c. 1890), Misenhimer-Rufty House (1904), D.C. Bradshaw House, Ellington-Brown House, Coggin-Ludwig House, and Park Ave United Methodist Church (1916).
