= Gold Hill Township, Rowan County, North Carolina =

Township in Rowan County, North Carolina, U.S.

Coordinates: 35.5447535°N 80.4215246°W

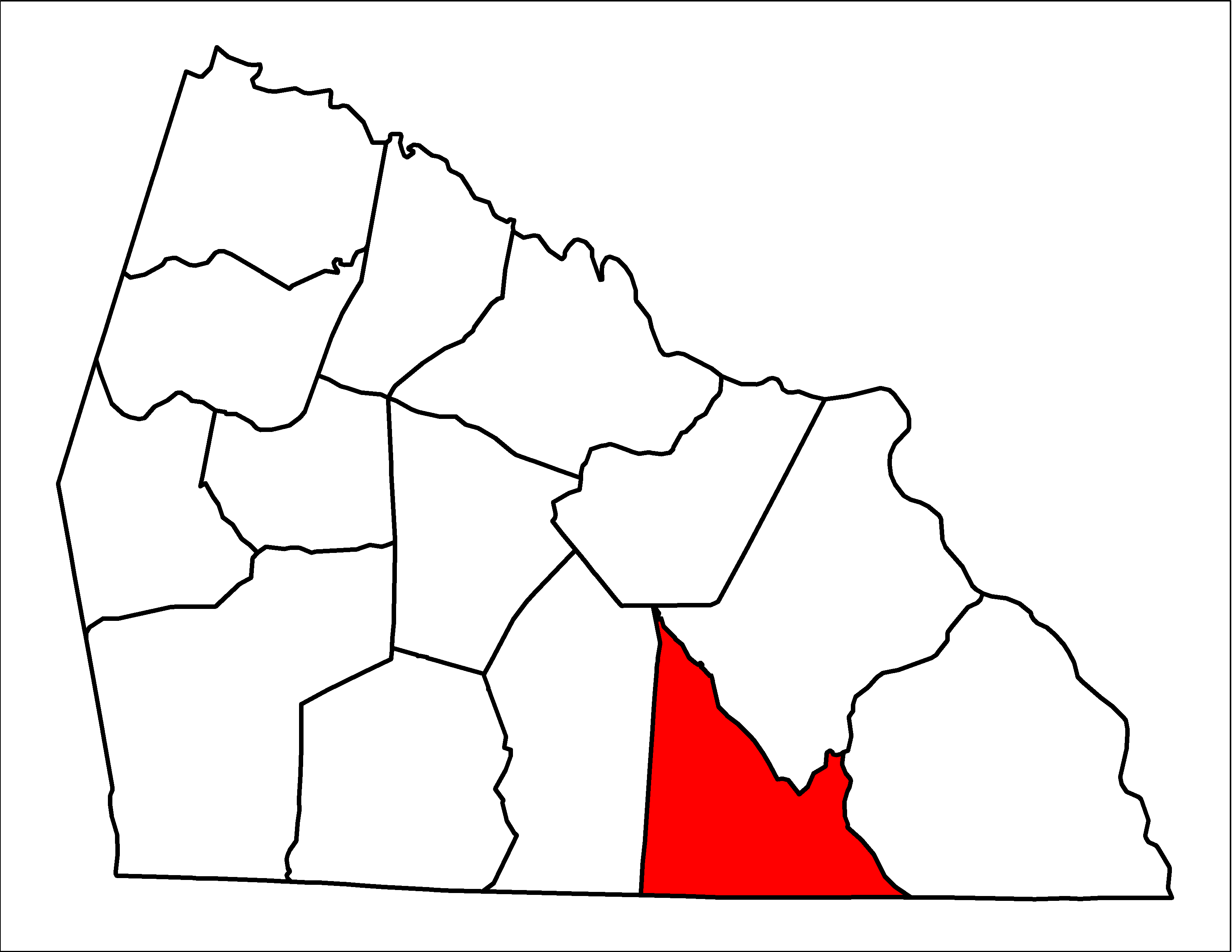
Location of Gold Hill Township in Rowan County, N.C.

Gold Hill Township is one of fourteen townships in Rowan County, North Carolina, United States. The township had a population of 10,015 according to the 2000 census.

Geographically, Gold Hill Township occupies 32.29 square miles (83.6 km^{2}) in southern Rowan County. Incorporated municipalities in Gold Hill Township include the town of Rockwell and portions of the town of Granite Quarry. The township's southern boundary is with Cabarrus County.

Lyerly Building for Boys was listed on the National Register of Historic Places in 1988.
