= Calvin H. Wiley School =

Historic school building in North Carolina, United States

- U.S. National Register of Historic Places
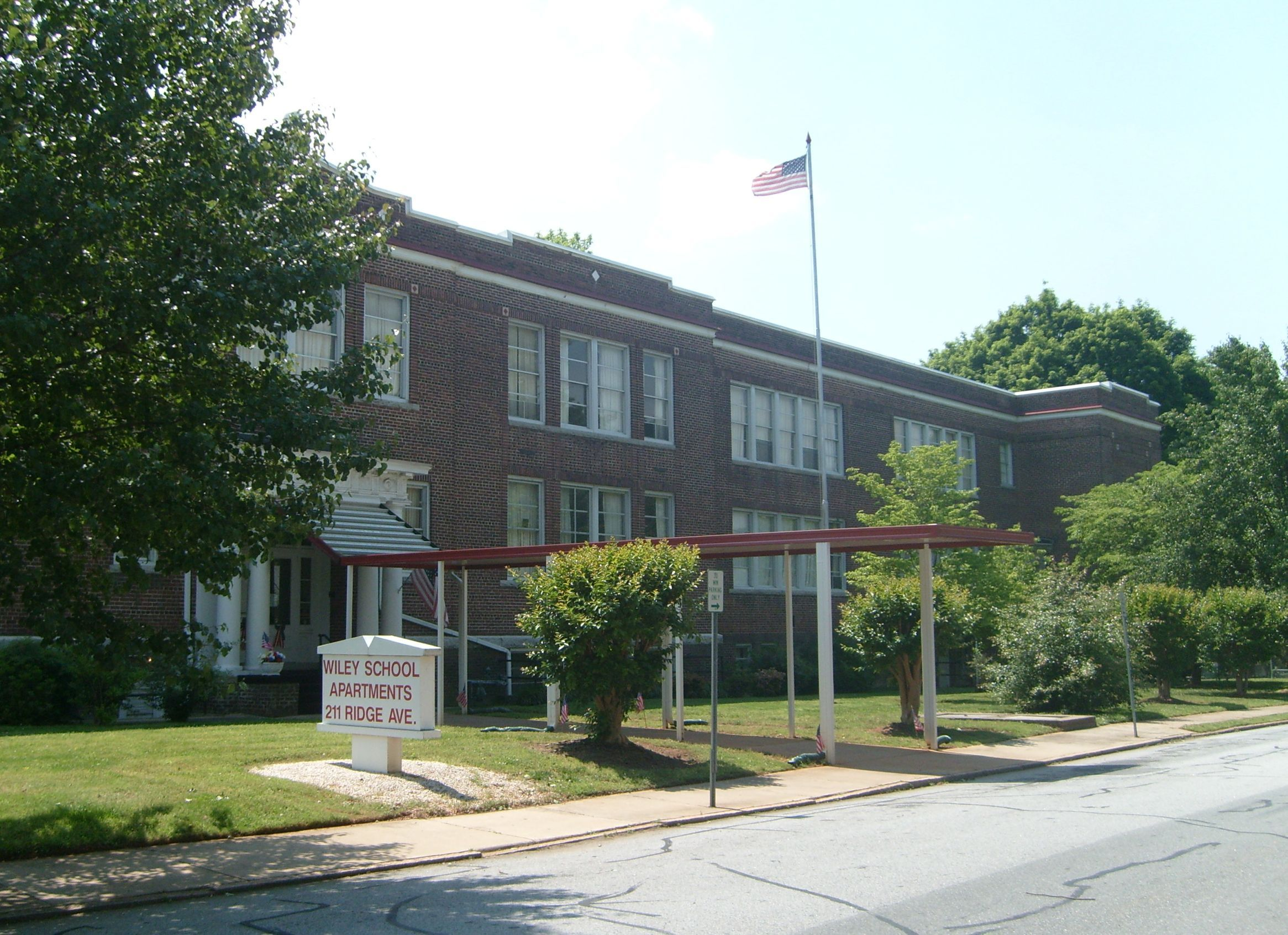
- Calvin H. Wiley School, April 2012

- Location within North Carolina Location within the United States
- Location: 200 blk. of Ridge Ave., Salisbury, North Carolina
- Coordinates: 35°39′46″N 80°29′12″W
- Area: 1.8 acres (0.73 ha)
- Built: 1916-1918, 1921, 1951
- Architect: Crane, J.F., & Co.; Kenerly, John
- Architectural style: Classical Revival, Utilitarian Industrial
- NRHP reference No.: 88002028
- Added to NRHP: October 20, 1988

Calvin H. Wiley School, also known as the West Ward School, is a historic school building located at Salisbury, Rowan County, North Carolina. The original building was built in 1916–1918, and is a two-story rectangular brick building with Classical Revival-style design elements. A classroom addition was built in 1921 and an auditorium and lunchroom added in 1951. The school closed in 1983, and was subsequently renovated into apartments.

The school was named for Calvin H. Wiley, the first Superintendent of Public Instruction. It was listed on the National Register of Historic Places in 1988.
