= Kesler Manufacturing Co.–Cannon Mills Co. Plant No. 7 Historic District =

Historic district in North Carolina, United States

- U.S. National Register of Historic Places
- U.S. Historic district
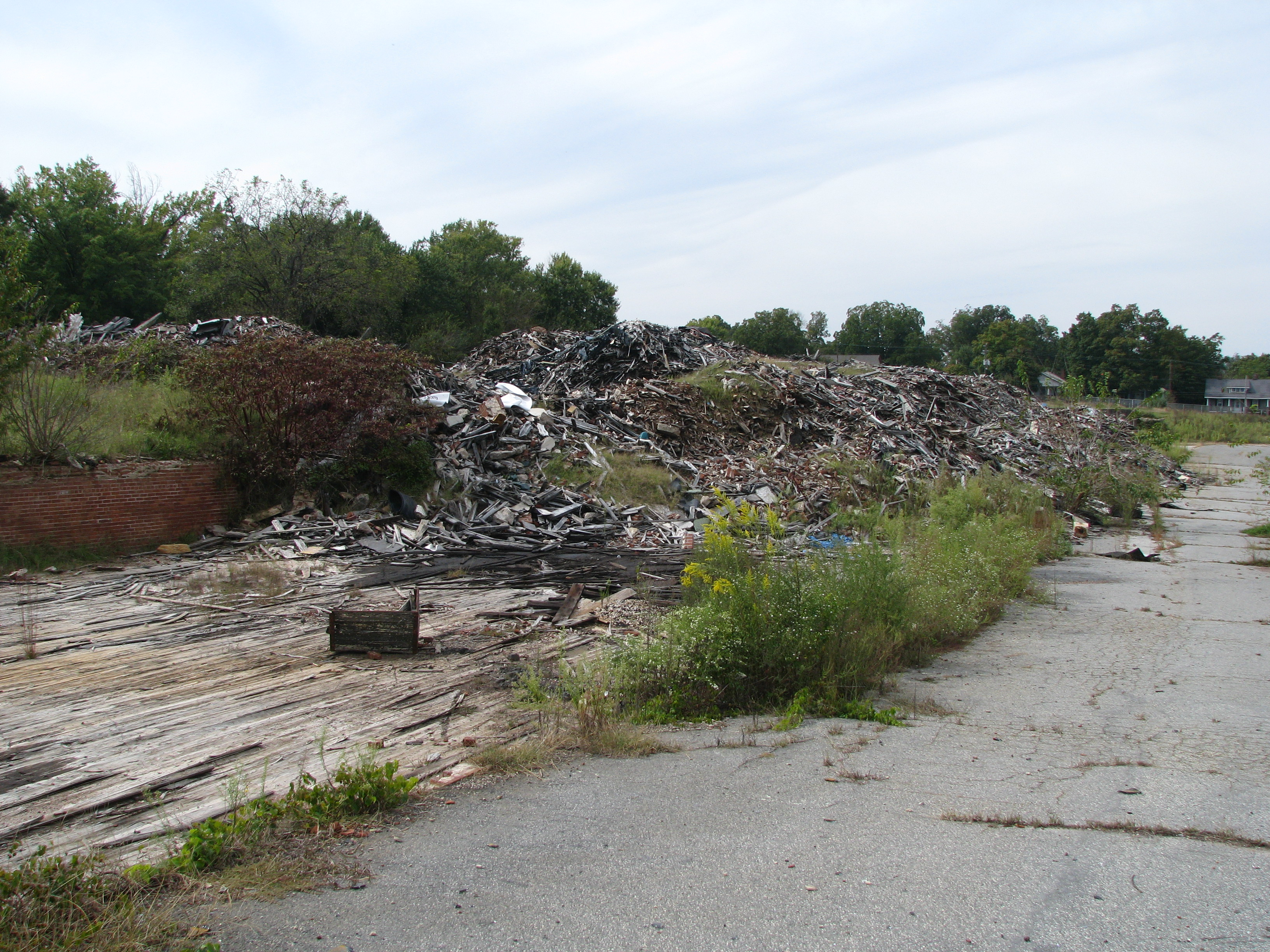
- Kesler–Cannon Mill remains, September 2012

- Location within North Carolina Location within the United States
- Location: Park Ave. and Boundary St., Salisbury, North Carolina
- Coordinates: 35°40′35″N 80°27′44″W
- Area: 10 acres (4.0 ha)
- Architect: Multiple
- Architectural style: Bungalow/craftsman, Gothic
- NRHP reference No.: 85001346
- Added to NRHP: June 20, 1985

Kesler Manufacturing Co.–Cannon Mills Co. Plant No. 7 Historic District is a national historic district located at Salisbury, Rowan County, North Carolina. The district encompasses 109 contributing buildings and 1 contributing structure consisting of a complex of industrial buildings and mill dwellings. It largely developed between about 1895 and 1930, and includes notable examples of Gothic Revival and Bungalow / American Craftsman style architecture. Notable buildings include the Kesler Manufacturing Company/Cannon Mills complex (1895–1930), Kepley–Trexler House, Henry–Kesler Manufacturing Company House (1910), Kimball–Kesler Mill House (1916), and Morgan–Kesler Manufacturing Company House (1914).

It was listed on the National Register of Historic Places in 1985.
