= Bernhardt House =

Historic house in North Carolina, United States

- U.S. National Register of Historic Places
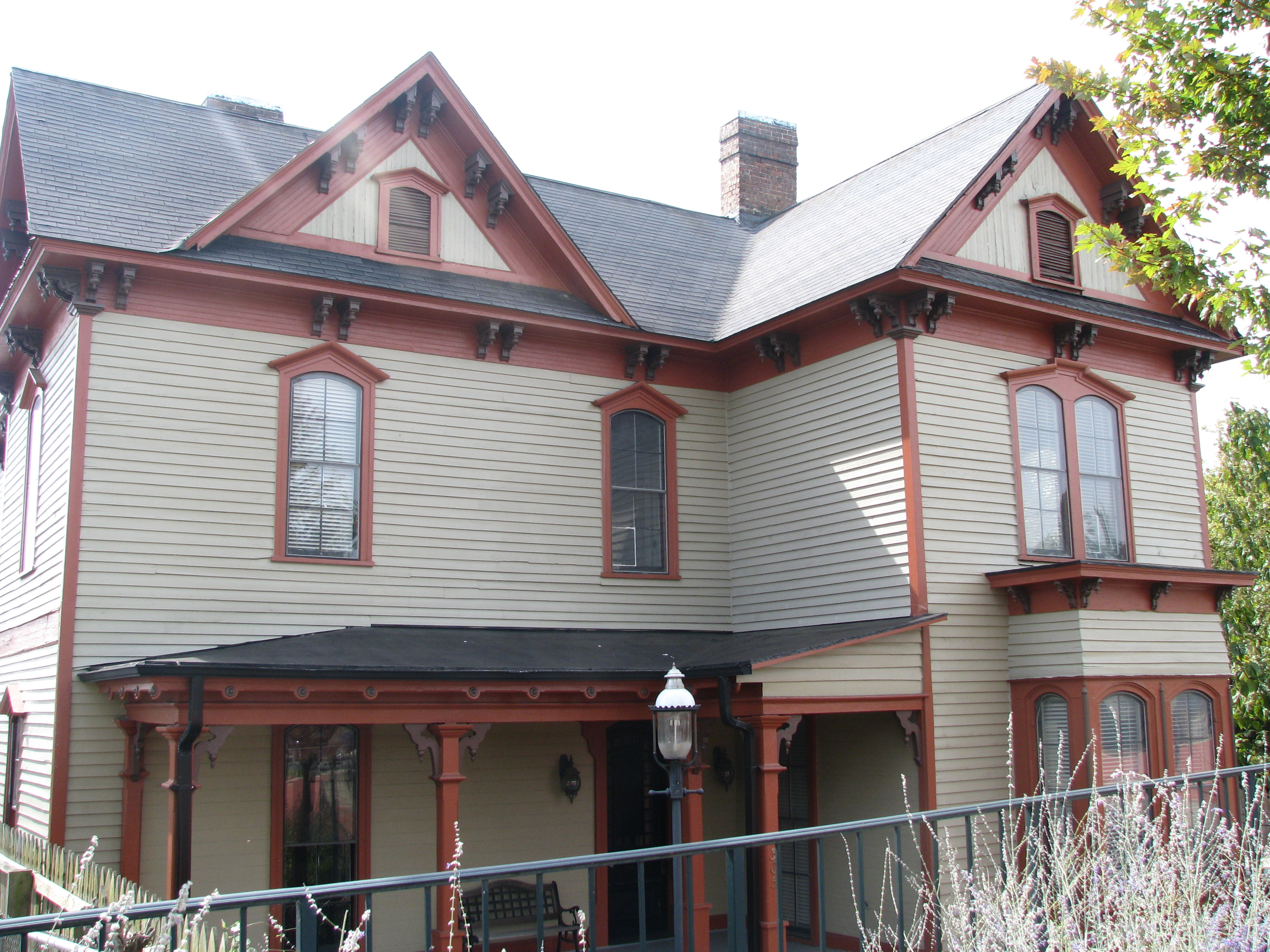
- Bernhardt House, September 2012

- Location within North Carolina Location within the United States
- Location: 305 E. Innes St., Salisbury, North Carolina
- Coordinates: 35°39′54″N 80°28′4″W
- Area: 0.3 acres (0.12 ha)
- Built: 1882
- Architectural style: Italianate, Italian Villa
- NRHP reference No.: 92000701
- Added to NRHP: June 11, 1992

Bernhardt House, also known as the Paul Mathias Bernhardt House, is a historic home located at Salisbury, Rowan County, North Carolina. It was built in 1882 and remodeled in 1902, and is a two-story, center-hall/double-pile plan, Italian Villa-style frame dwelling. It features arch-headed windows with heavy projecting hoods, an L-shaped porch, and bracketed eaves and gables. A rear addition was built in 1948 and the house was converted to four rental apartments. Its builder Paul Mathias Bernhardt (1846–1922) was a son of George Matthias Bernhardt (1820–1885), who built the George Matthias Bernhardt House near Rockwell, North Carolina.

It was listed on the National Register of Historic Places in 1992.
