= Griffith–Sowers House =

Historic house in North Carolina, United States

- U.S. National Register of Historic Places
- Location within North Carolina Location within the United States
- Location: 5050 Statesville Boulevard, near Salisbury, North Carolina
- Coordinates: 35°42′50″N 80°34′07″W
- Area: 30 acres (12 ha)
- Built: 1930
- Architect: Bloxam, Percy
- Architectural style: Colonial Revival
- NRHP reference No.: 09000703
- Added to NRHP: September 9, 2009

The Griffith–Sowers House is a United States historic home located near Salisbury, Rowan County, North Carolina. It was built between 1930 and 1932 and is a large two-story, Colonial Revival style frame country house. It features a five-bay wide center block that is covered by a side-gable slate roof and linked by shallow one-bay wide hyphens to flanking, recessed, and perpendicular gable-front two-story wings. Other features include the poultry house (c. 1934–1940), barn (c. 1934-c. 1960), small storage building (c. 1940–1950), and landscaped grounds.

It was listed on the National Register of Historic Places in 2009.
