= Lyerly Building for Boys =

- U.S. National Register of Historic Places
- Location within North Carolina Location within the United States
- Location: Crescent Rd./Rt. 3, Gold Hill Township, North Carolina
- Coordinates: 35°34′12″N 80°25′47″W
- Area: 4.3 acres (1.7 ha)
- Built: 1913-1916
- Architectural style: Gothic Revival, Vernacular Gothic Revival
- NRHP reference No.: 88003006
- Added to NRHP: January 5, 1989

Lyerly Building for Boys, also known as Nazareth Orphans' Home, Nazareth Children's Home or Nazareth Child & Family Connection, is a historic orphanage located at Gold Hill Township, Rowan County, North Carolina. It was built between 1913 and 1916, and is a two-story, front gabled, vernacular Gothic Revival style granite building. It has a steeply pitched parapeted slate roof. The building housed a school and chapel on the first floor with a boy's dormitory above.

It was listed on the National Register of Historic Places in 1988.
