= Faith, North Carolina =

- Town
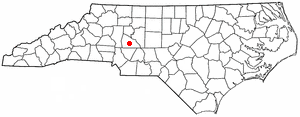
- Location of Faith, North Carolina
- Coordinates: 35°35′24″N 80°27′30″W
- Country: United States
- State: North Carolina
- County: Rowan

Area
  - Total: 1.05 sq mi (2.71 km^{2})
  - Land: 1.05 sq mi (2.71 km^{2})
  - Water: 0 sq mi (0.00 km^{2})
- Elevation: 886 ft (270 m)

Population (2020)
  - Total: 819
  - Density: 781.5/sq mi (301.74/km^{2})
- Time zone: UTC-5 (Eastern (EST))
  - Summer (DST): UTC-4 (EDT)
- ZIP code: 28041
- Area code: 704
- FIPS code: 37-22600
- GNIS feature ID: 2406483
- Website: www.faithnc.com

Faith is a town in Rowan County, North Carolina, United States, incorporated in 1903. As of the 2020 census, Faith had a population of 819.

Since 1946, the town has hosted a Fourth of July celebration that has become notably large for a town of its population – running for several days and drawing visitors from many states. The Faith Fourth achieved national visibility in 1992, when President George H. W. Bush not only made a speech praising small town virtues, but also participated in the traditional Fourth of July softball game.

== History ==
Shuping's Mill Complex was listed on the National Register of Historic Places in 1982.

Historian and sociologist James W. Loewen has identified Faith as one of several possible sundown towns in North Carolina.

== Geography ==
According to the United States Census Bureau, the town has a total area of 1.0 square mile (2.6 km^{2}), all land.

== Demographics ==
Historical population
Census	Pop.	Note	%±
1910	352		—
1920	348		−1.1%
1930	431		23.9%
1940	449		4.2%
1950	490		9.1%
1960	494		0.8%
1970	506		2.4%
1980	552		9.1%
1990	553		0.2%
2000	695		25.7%
2010	807		16.1%
2020	819		1.5%
U.S. Decennial Census

=== 2020 census ===
Faith racial composition
Race	Number	Percentage
White (non-Hispanic)	746	91.09%
Black or African American (non-Hispanic)	2	0.24%
Native American	2	0.24%
Asian	4	0.49%
Other/Mixed	37	4.52%
Hispanic or Latino	28	3.42%

As of the 2020 United States census, there were 819 people, 309 households, and 222 families residing in the town.

=== 2000 census ===
As of the census of 2000, there were 695 people, 276 households, and 210 families residing in the town. The population density was 710.2 people per square mile (274.2 people/km^{2}). There were 308 housing units at an average density of 314.7 per square mile (121.5/km^{2}). The racial makeup of the town was 95.83% White, 3.17% African American, 0.14% Asian, and 0.86% from two or more races. Hispanic or Latino of any race were 0.14% of the population.

There were 276 households, out of which 31.5% had children under the age of 18 living with them, 62.3% were married couples living together, 9.1% had a female householder with no husband present, and 23.6% were non-families. 20.3% of all households were made up of individuals, and 9.4% had someone living alone who was 65 years of age or older. The average household size was 2.52 and the average family size was 2.88.

In the town, the population was spread out, with 23.5% under the age of 18, 7.5% from 18 to 24, 31.7% from 25 to 44, 22.0% from 45 to 64, and 15.4% who were 65 years of age or older. The median age was 37 years. For every 100 females, there were 98.6 males. For every 100 females age 18 and over, there were 93.5 males.

The median income for a household in the town was $41,875, and the median income for a family was $47,969. Males had a median income of $32,303 versus $24,559 for females. The per capita income for the town was $18,207. About 6.5% of families and 6.6% of the population were below the poverty line, including 10.2% of those under age 18 and 8.5% of those age 65 or over.
