= George Matthias Bernhardt House =

Historic house in North Carolina, United States

- U.S. National Register of Historic Places
- Location within North Carolina Location within the United States
- Location: S of Rockwell on SR 2361, near Rockwell, North Carolina
- Coordinates: 35°30′27″N 80°25′42″W
- Area: 323 acres (131 ha)
- Built: c. 1855
- Architectural style: Greek Revival
- NRHP reference No.: 82001303
- Added to NRHP: November 26, 1982

The George Matthias Bernhardt House is a historic plantation house located near Rockwell, Rowan County, North Carolina.

== Description and history ==
It was built in about 1855, and is a two-story, "T"-plan, Greek Revival-style frame dwelling. It has a gable roof, sits on a brick foundation, and is sheathed in weatherboard. Also on the 323 acre property are the contributing double pen log barn, log smokehouse, well shed, two granaries, and plantation office. Paul Mathias Bernhardt (1846-1922), a son of George Matthias Bernhardt (1820-1885), built the Bernhardt House at Salisbury, North Carolina.

It was listed on the National Register of Historic Places on November 26, 1982.
