= Henry Connor Bost House =

Historic house in North Carolina, United States

- U.S. National Register of Historic Places
- Location within North Carolina Location within the United States
- Location: E of Woodleaf off US 601, near South River, North Carolina
- Coordinates: 35°46′01″N 80°30′45″W
- Area: 139.1 acres (56.3 ha)
- Built: c. 1869
- Architectural style: Greek Revival
- NRHP reference No.: 82001304
- Added to NRHP: November 12, 1982

Henry Connor Bost House is a historic home located near South River, Rowan County, North Carolina. It is also very close to Salisbury, NC. It was built in 1869, and is a two-story, center-hall plan, Greek Revival style frame dwelling. It is sheathed in weatherboard and has a full-width, hipped roof porch. It was purchased in 1961 from the second owners and fully restored in 1993.

The home is surrounded by 135 acres of private rolling hills and woodlands. The acreage is protected by the Three Rivers Land Trust. It is now used as a special event venue and airbnb/vacation rental under the name of Henry Connor Bost House and Farm. The family also uses the home for family gatherings/vacations.

It was listed on the National Register of Historic Places in 1982.
