= Brooklyn–South Square Historic District =

Historic district in North Carolina, United States

- U.S. National Register of Historic Places
- U.S. Historic district
- Location within North Carolina Location within the United States
- Location: Roughly bounded by E Fisher, S Shaver, E Bank and S Lee Sts., Salisbury, North Carolina
- Coordinates: 35°39′49″N 80°28′08″W
- Area: 15 acres (6.1 ha)
- Architect: Multiple
- Architectural style: Greek Revival, Late Victorian, Federal
- NRHP reference No.: 85001449
- Added to NRHP: July 5, 1985

Brooklyn–South Square Historic District is a national historic district located at Salisbury, Rowan County, North Carolina. The district encompasses 65 contributing buildings in predominantly residential section of Salisbury. It largely developed between about 1875 and 1925, and includes notable examples of Federal, Greek Revival, and Late Victorian style architecture. Notable buildings include the Woodson-Overcash House (c. 1840), Blackmer-Propst House (c. 1856), Mowery-Peeler House (c. 1880), Keen-Bastian House (c. 1895), William Trott House (1905), J. W. Glover House (1920s), Cross-Crowell-Rufty Store (1920s), Burges-Lyerly-Fifty/Fifty Store (1920s), and the former St. Peter's Episcopal Church.

It was listed on the National Register of Historic Places in 1985.
