= Grimes Mill (Salisbury, North Carolina) =

Destroyed historic mill in North Carolina, US

- U.S. National Register of Historic Places
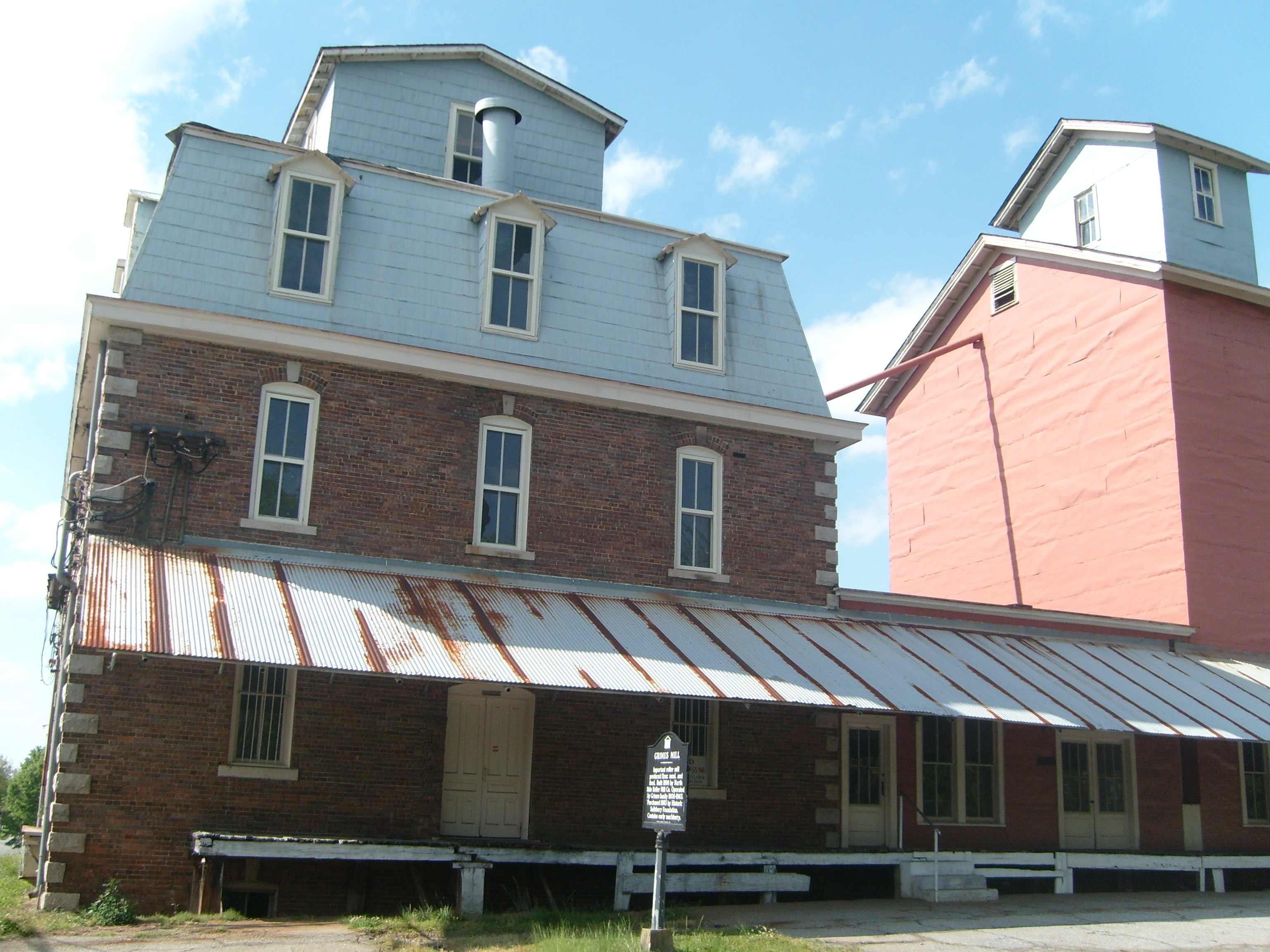
- Grimes Mill in April, 2012

- Location within North Carolina Location within the United States
- Location: 600 N. Church St., Salisbury, North Carolina
- Coordinates: 35°40′22″N 80°27′56″W
- Built: 1896
- Architectural style: Second Empire style Victorian roller mill
- NRHP reference No.: 84002492
- Added to NRHP: February 6, 1984

Grimes Mill was located at 600 N. Church St. in Salisbury, North Carolina. It was built in 1896 as a flour and feed mill. It stayed active until 1982. The Historic Salisbury Foundation bought it that year and later turned it into a museum. It was listed on the National Register of Historic Places and was the only roller mill museum in North Carolina. The site was destroyed by fire on January 16, 2013.

== History ==
The mill was originally established as North Side Roller Mill. It was one of the first flour roller mills in the county. It was built in 1896 by a group of Salisbury businessmen to compete with the Salisbury Roller Mill. In the first year of operation, it was producing fifty barrels of flour in each 24-hour day. In 1898, the mill was sold to another company which then went bankrupt in 1906. John D. Grimes, a businessman from nearby Davidson County who established the first roller mill in North Carolina in Lexington in 1879, bought the mill after its bankruptcy for $4,000. By that time, the mill's original three floors had an additional expanded area of two floors.

The Grimes family continued ownership of the mill until 1963. During that time, the mill was expanded, the largest addition coming in 1912. That year, twelve large storage bins were added to the facility that had an aggregate capacity of 90,000 pounds of wheat. The most productive time for the mill was in the 1930s when it produced a peak of 100 barrels of flour per day.

The W. A. Davis Milling Company from High Point, North Carolina, took over control of the property in 1963 after John D. Grimes, grandson of the first Grimes owner, sold the property to Robert Davis. Davis added a retail store area to the building and the Davis Milling Company produced flour, grains and pigeon pellets. Near the end of the Davis ownership, only two employees rand the mill which only produced flour as a glue extender.

The Historic Salisbury Foundation, a historic preservation group in Rowan County, bought the plant for $60,000 in 1982. The next year, they opened the site up as a museum, only the second historic site owned by the foundation to be such. The next year, on February 6, 1984, the site was added to the National Register of Historic Places. It existed from then on as the only roller mill museum in North Carolina, until its destruction by fire in 2013.

=== 2013 fire ===
On January 16, 2013, calls to 911 reporting a fire came in around 9:40 pm. It would eventually become a five-alarm fire, bringing in crews from several nearby fire stations. The fire continued to burn well into the next day and fire investigators were not able to get into the building to find a cause for the fire for several days. Brian Davis, executive director of the Historic Salisbury Foundation stated that the property did have burglary and fire alarms, but no sprinkler system.

After the fire, as a fundraiser to help finance the site cleanup, the Historic Salisbury Foundation started selling bricks from the mill. The only other roller mill still extant in Rowan County is the China Grove Roller Mill.

== Architecture ==
The roller mill was designed and built by the founders, D. R. Julian, A. C. Mauney, James C. McCanless and Napoleon B. McCanless. The original building was three stories tall and built in a Second Empire style, Victorian construction; one of the few Second Empire style buildings with industrial use in North Carolina. It was a granite-trimmed brick building.
