= North Main Street Historic District (Salisbury, North Carolina) =

Historic district in North Carolina, United States

- U.S. National Register of Historic Places
- U.S. Historic district
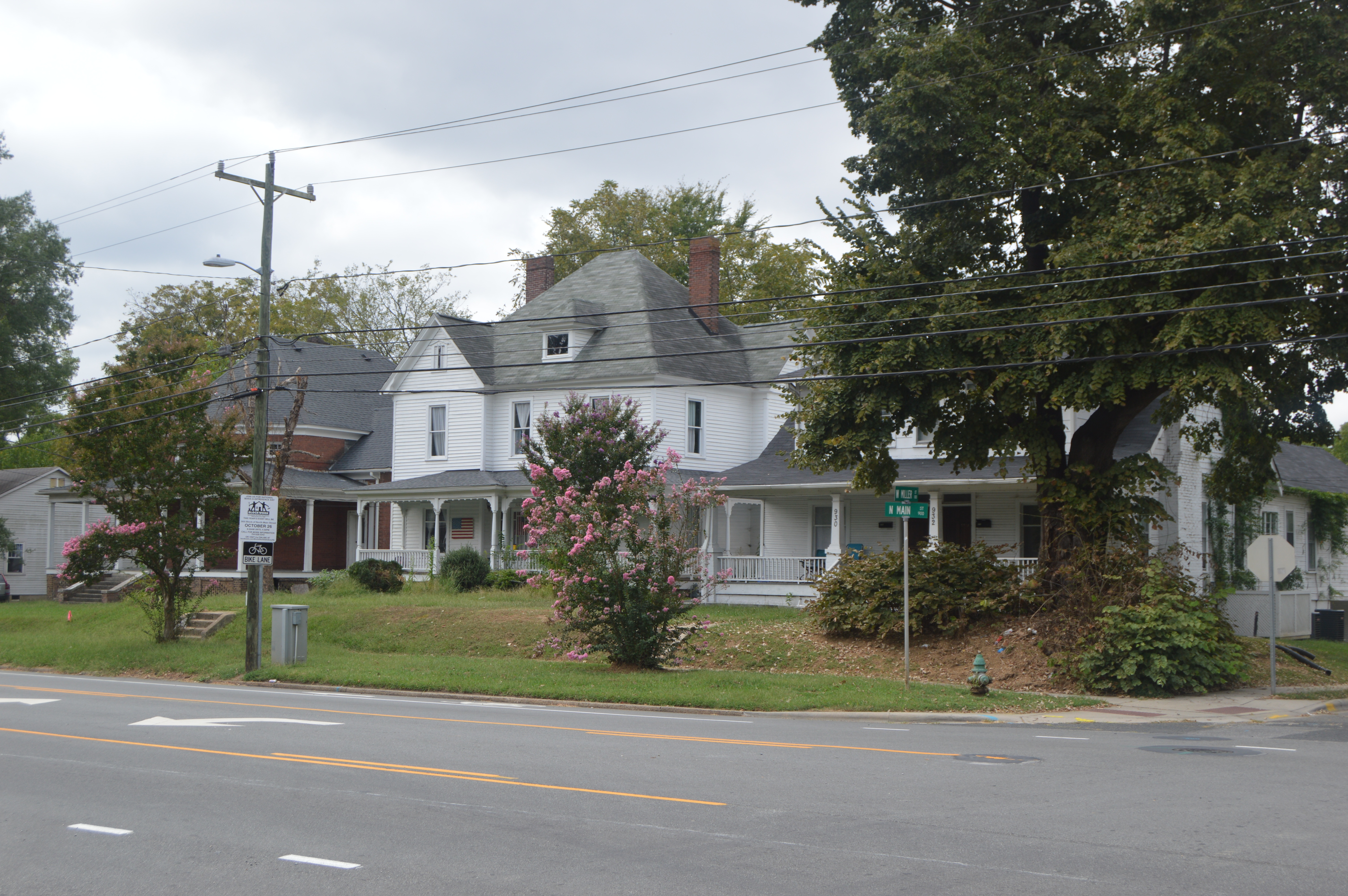
- Houses on Main south of Miller

- Location within North Carolina Location within the United States
- Location: Roughly bounded by N. Main, 17th, Lee and Lafayette Sts., Salisbury, North Carolina
- Coordinates: 35°40′33″N 80°27′25″W
- Area: 70 acres (28 ha)
- Architect: Multiple
- Architectural style: Bungalow/craftsman, Colonial, Late Victorian
- NRHP reference No.: 85001674
- Added to NRHP: July 29, 1985

North Main Street Historic District is a national historic district located at Salisbury, Rowan County, North Carolina. The district encompasses 123 contributing buildings in predominantly residential section of Salisbury. It largely developed between about 1900 and 1930, and includes notable examples of Late Victorian, Colonial Revival, and Bungalow / American Craftsman style architecture. Notable buildings include the Henderlite-Kluttz House, Hines-Norman House, J. R. Crawford House, A. G. Peeler House, Davis-Wilhelm House, Salisbury-Spencer Railway Company's streetcar barn, Trexler-McSwain Store, Barringer and Rufty General Store, and the North Main Street School, now known as the John S. Henderson School.

It was listed on the National Register of Historic Places in 1985.
