= Bostian Heights, North Carolina =

- Unincorporated community
- Location within North Carolina Location within the United States
- Coordinates: 35°33′38″N 80°31′25″W
- Country: United States
- State: North Carolina
- County: Rowan
- Elevation: 833 ft (254 m)
- Time zone: UTC-5 (Eastern (EST))
  - Summer (DST): UTC-4 (EDT)
- Area codes: 704 & 980
- GNIS feature ID: 1019263

Bostian Heights is an unincorporated community in Rowan County, North Carolina, United States. The community is located on North Carolina Highway 152, 3.3 miles (5.3 km) east of China Grove.

The John Stigerwalt House, which is listed on the National Register of Historic Places, is located near Bostian Heights.
