= Walter McCanless House =

Historic house in North Carolina, United States

- U.S. National Register of Historic Places
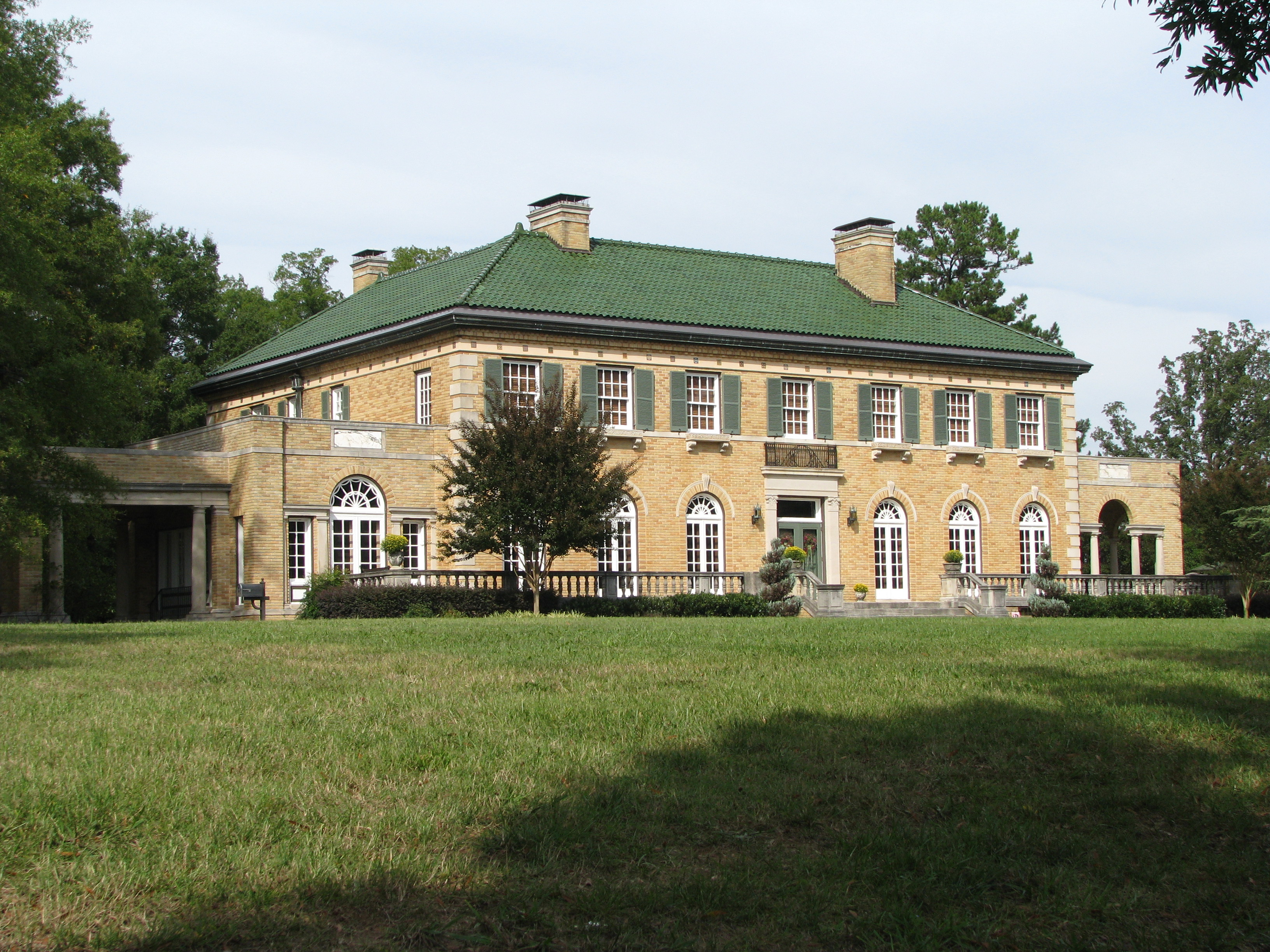
- McCanless House, September 2012

- Location within North Carolina Location within the United States
- Location: 200 Confederate Ave., Salisbury, North Carolina
- Coordinates: 35°40′59″N 80°28′8″W
- Area: 1.8 acres (0.73 ha)
- Built: 1927-1929
- Architect: Benton & Benton
- Architectural style: Renaissance
- NRHP reference No.: 05000452
- Added to NRHP: May 21, 2005

The Walter McCanless House, also known (for later owners) as the Hedrick House or Donaldson House, is a historic home on Confederate Avenue in Salisbury, Rowan County, North Carolina, and was completed in 1929. The building was listed in the National Register of Historic Places in 2005.

It is a large two-story, buff brick and terra cotta, Renaissance Revival-style mansion. It consists of a two-story main block with flanking single-story pavilions, and two symmetrical two-story rear ells project to give the home a U-shaped plan. Other contributing resources are the garage (c. 1929) and swimming pool (c. 1929). The entire property is a triple plat.

The home was designed by architecture firm Benton & Benton of Wilson, North Carolina, and built between 1927 and 1929 for businessman Walter Franklin McCanless (1887–1958), son of Napoleon Bonaparte McCanless. The construction cost was reported to be $250,000 (over $4.5 million in modern dollars). It has been described as the county's "finest Italian Renaissance Revival house ... whose grandeur is unrivalled" in the area.

== See also ==
- Napoleon Bonaparte McCanless House
