= Ellen Sigmond =

Norwegian geologist (born 1936)

Ellen Margrethe Ording Sigmond (born 1936) is a Norwegian geologist, "a pioneer in Norwegian geological science and mapping". She is known as the lead author of the 2013 Norsk geologisk ordbok [Norwegian Geological Dictionary] and for compiling the 2003 "Geological Map of Land and Sea Areas of Northern Europe".

== Education and career ==
Sigmond was born on 15 April 1936 in Oslo, near Ullevål Hageby; her father was a lawyer. Initially planning to become a teacher, she taught in Lofoten for a year after high school, and then briefly entered teacher training in Oslo, but left the program after only two weeks after finding it to be too heavily religious. Instead, she turned to science, began studying geology at the University of Oslo, and began doing fieldwork in the Norwegian mountains in the late 1950s.

After continuing her studies at the University of Bergen and earning a candidate degree in 1963, she worked for the Geological Survey of Norway from 1964 until 1973 and again from 1979 until her retirement in 2006. From 1974 to 1979 she worked in Iceland at the Nordic Volcanological Institute of the University of Iceland. After retiring, she continued to consult for the Geological Survey of Norway.

== Recognition ==
The Geological Society of Norway gave Andreassen the Brøgger Prize, a lifetime achievement award of the society, in 2017. She became the first female recipient of the prize. In 2021, ALTSÅ magazine listed her as one of 100 inspiring women, the only geologist on the list. She received the King's Medal of Merit in 2025.
