= Aaron Sigmond =

American writer

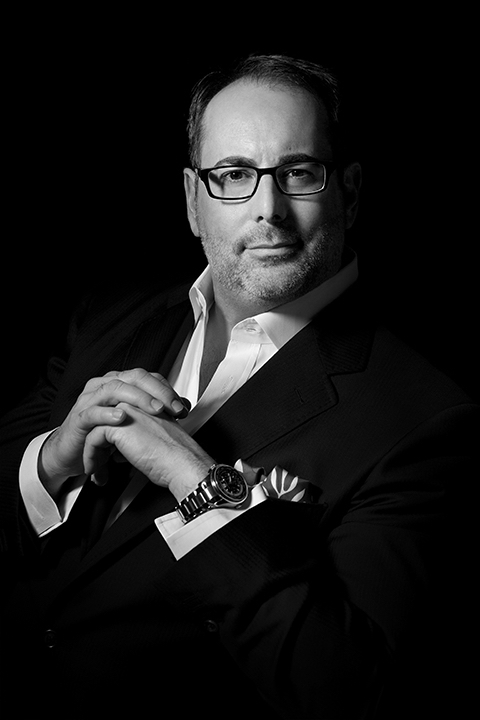
- Occupations: Author, editor, publisher

Aaron Sigmond is an American author, editor and publisher with a focus on luxury heritage brands.

== Magazine and publishing career ==
Sigmond moved from Los Angeles to New York City to pursue a career in magazine publishing. He created and launched the cigar lifestyle periodical Smoke magazine. Along the way he became a recognized authority on cigars, wine and spirits. Sigmond worked his way up to become Group Publisher of Profile Pursuit, focusing on custom publishing for clients such as Crunch Fitness and publisher of Radar. Sigmond was most recently editor-in-chief of Mechanics of Style, a custom digital men's luxury lifestyle journal for Girard-Perregaux. He most recently served as Director of Luxury Consumer Content and as a columnist Jing Daily. Sigmond also served as the Group Luxury Editor for DoubleDown Media and was the launch publisher of Radar magazine.

Sigmond unsuccessfully attempted to launch a glossy magazine based on the Suicide Girls.

== Writing career ==
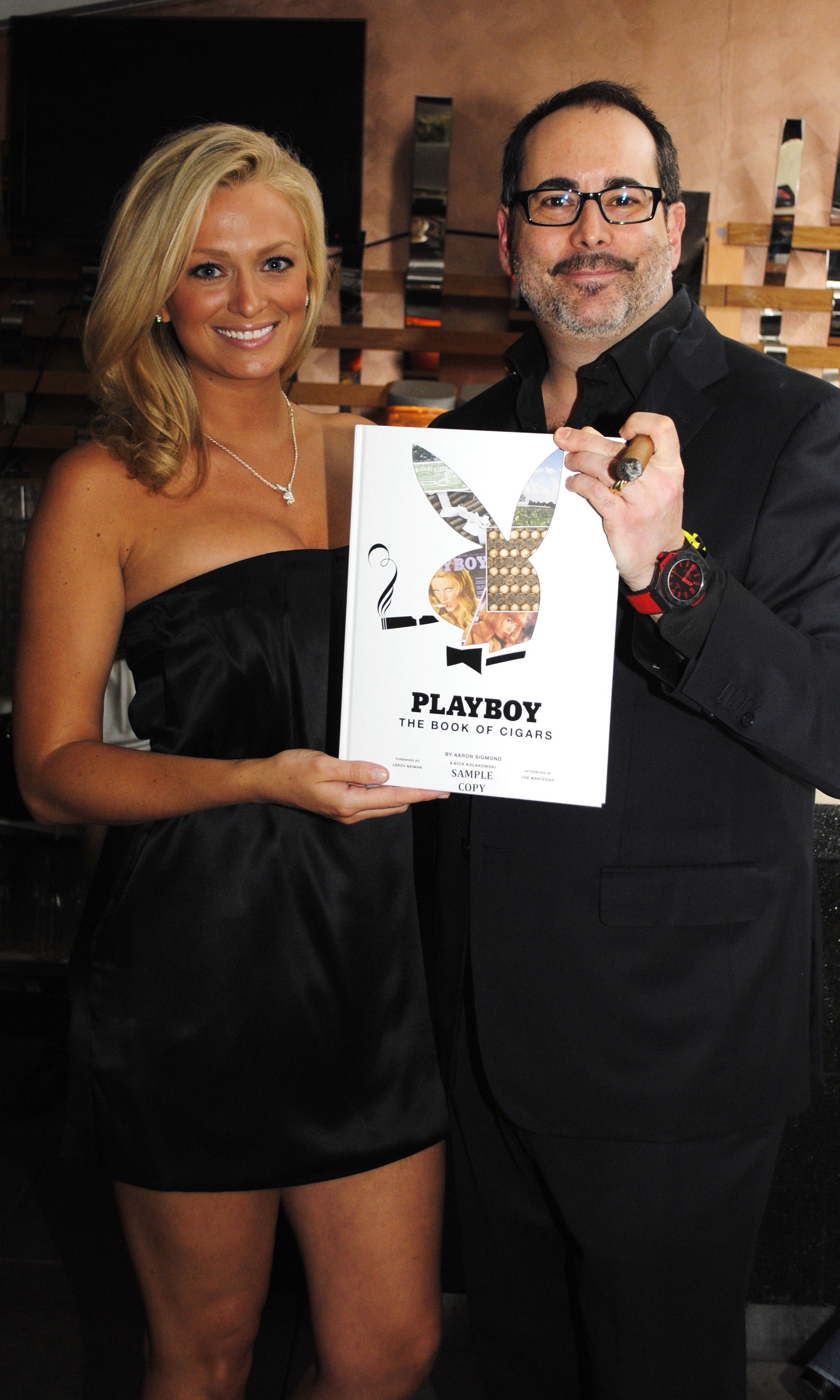
Sigmond at the launch of the Playboy: Book of Cigars in 2010.

Sigmond has written for publications including Robb Report, Worth, The Big Stage from the NYSE. He also served as contributing editor or senior contributing editor for Playboy, for which he wrote Playboy: The Book of Cigars with Nick Kolakowski. Sigmond is also a noted timepiece writer, having written for both Revolution, Watchonista and aBlogToWatch. He has published two related books: The New Face of Tradition: Young Watch Masters of Girard-Perregaux & The Art of Making Time and the much lauded Drive Time: Watches Inspired by Automobiles, Motorcycles and Racing (Rizzoli, 2016), with a foreword by car and watch collector Jay Leno and afterword by actor and racer Patrick Dempsey.

== Abridged Bibliography ==
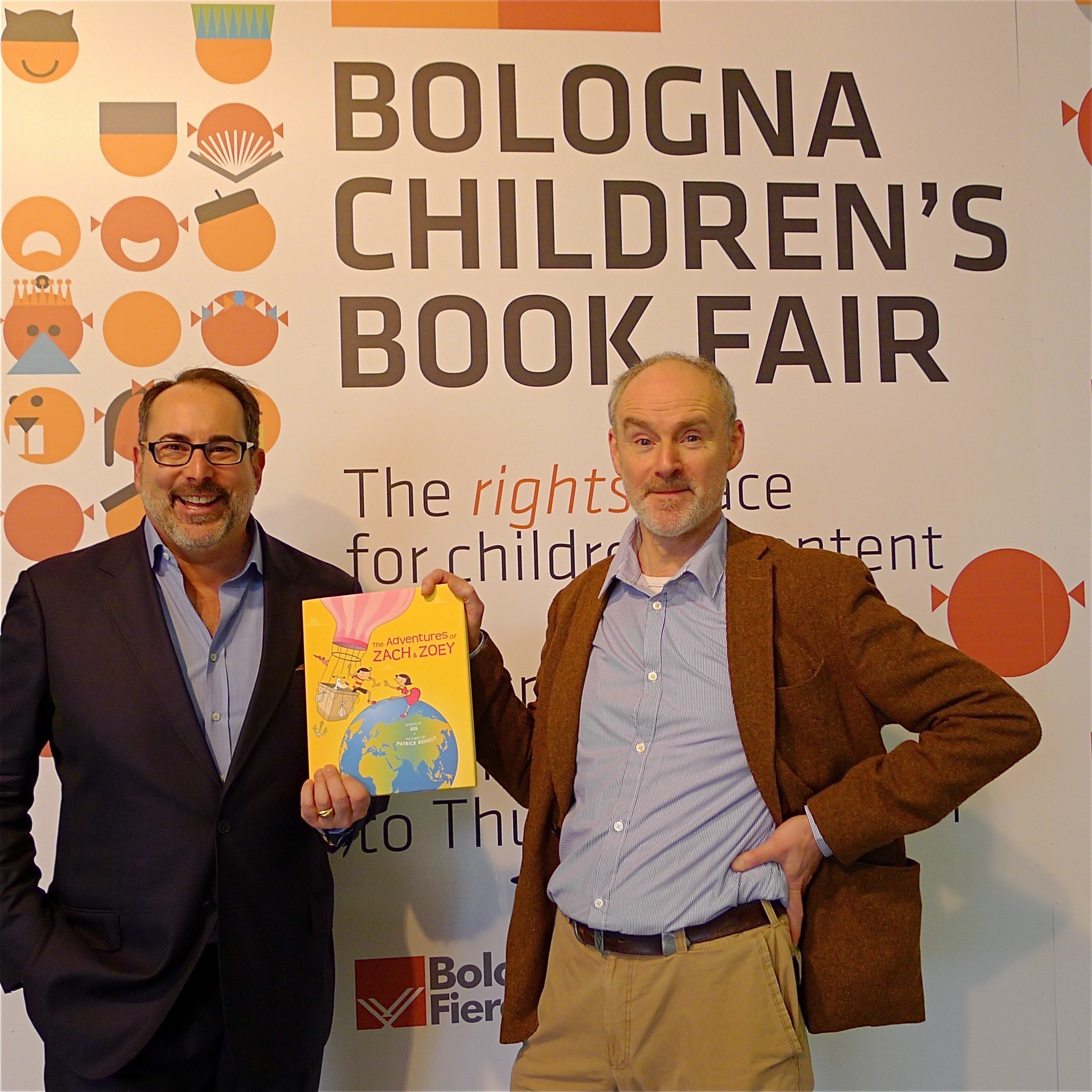
Sigmond presenting his book The Adventures of Zach & Zoey with illustrator Patrick Regout in 2014 at the Bologna Children's Book Fair.

- Stucklin, Mark (1998). The Cigar Handbook: A Buyer's Guide to the World's Finest Cigars. Barnes & Noble Books. ASIN B002B3HOQM. (Foreword)
- Playboy: The Book of Cigars. Skyhorse Publishing. 2010. ISBN 978-1616080235.
- Graycliff: 300 Years of Grand Bahamian Luxury. Mad Dash Press. 2011. ISBN 978-0615473819.
- Adams, Ariel (2014). The World's Most Expensive Watches. Antique Collectors Club. ISBN 978-1851497546. (Foreword)
- The New Face of Tradition: Young Watch Masters of Girard-Perregaux & The Art of Making Time (PDF). Girard-Perregaux/Sowind S.A. 2014. Archived from the original (PDF) on 2016-02-06.
- Drive Time: Watches Inspired by Automobiles, Motorcycles and Racing. New York: Rizzoli International. 2016. p. 304. ISBN 9780847848188. (Foreword by Jay Leno.)
- Sigmond, Aaron (2018). Bulova: A History of Firsts. New York: Assouline. p. 176. ISBN 9781614286929.
- Sigmond, Aaron (2019). Sea Time: Watches Inspired by Sailing and Diving. New York: Rizzoli International. p. 240. ISBN 9780847867318. (Foreword by Clive Cussler.)
- Sigmond, Aaron (2019). The Impossible Collection of Cigars. New York: Assouline. p. 232. ISBN 9781614287841.
- Forster, Jack (2020). Bulova: ACCUTRON: From the Space Age to the Digital Age. Coauthor Aaron Sigmond, foreword by Carl Gustav Magnusson. New York. p. 151. ISBN 9781614288725.
- Sigmond, Aaron (2023). ARTURO FUENTE From Dream to Dynasty. New York: Assouline. p. 304. ISBN 9781649801036.
- Sigmond, Aaron (2023). ARTURO FUENTE Since 1912. New York: Assouline. p. 240. ISBN 9781649801043. (Foreword by Andy García.)
- Sigmond, Aaron (2025). CIGARS A Biography Deluxe Edition. New York: Mad Dash Press. p. 418. ISBN 9780996736770.
- Sigmond, Aaron (2025). CIGARS A Biography Standard Edition. New York: Skyhorse Publishing Press. p. 424. ISBN 9781510784697.
