= Fulton Heights Historic District =

Historic district in North Carolina, United States

- U.S. National Register of Historic Places
- U.S. Historic district
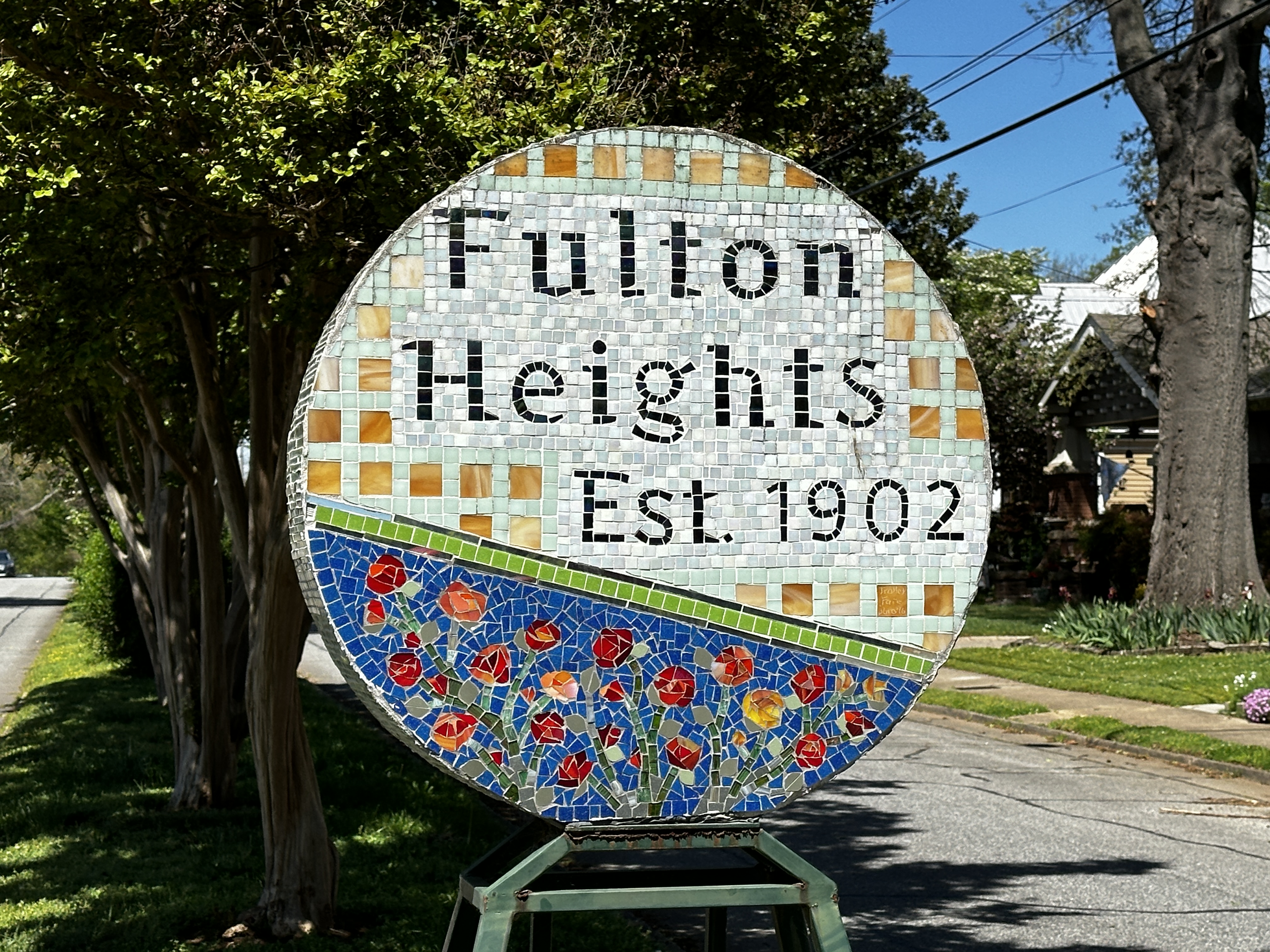
- Fulton Heights Neighborhood Sign, Trolley Fare, Salisbury NC by artist Jeanette Brossart

- Location within North Carolina Location within the United States
- Location: Roughly bounded by Fulton St., Heilig Ave., Ridge Ave., and Boyden St., Salisbury, North Carolina
- Coordinates: 35°39′40″N 80°29′25″W
- Area: 122 acres (49 ha)
- Built: 1904
- Architectural style: Colonial Revival, Bungalow/craftsman, et al.
- NRHP reference No.: 99000394
- Added to NRHP: March 25, 1999

Fulton Heights Historic District is a national historic district located at Salisbury, Rowan County, North Carolina. The district encompasses 439 contributing buildings and 2 contributing structures in predominantly residential section of Salisbury. It largely developed between about 1903 and 1948, and includes notable examples of Colonial Revival and Bungalow / American Craftsman style architecture. Notable buildings include the T.A. Ludwick House, Choate-Blount House, Lauriston Hardin House, Williams-Kesler House, Lewis D. Peeler House, F.W. Kirk House, Second Reformed Presbyterian Church (1913), First Associate Reformed Presbyterian Church (1939), Calvin H. Wiley School (1916), R. L. Foil and Company Grocery (1905), the Albright Cash Store, and the Piggly Wiggly Grocery.

It was listed on the National Register of Historic Places in 1999.
