= John Stigerwalt House =

Historic house in North Carolina, United States

- U.S. National Register of Historic Places
- Location within North Carolina Location within the United States
- Nearest city: E of Kannapolis off SR 1221 (Old Beatty Ford Rd.), near Bostian Heights, North Carolina
- Coordinates: 35°31′06″N 80°31′00″W
- Area: 74.5 acres (30.1 ha)
- Built: 1811
- NRHP reference No.: 84000595
- Added to NRHP: December 20, 1984

John Stigerwalt House is a historic home located near Bostian Heights, Rowan County, North Carolina. It was built in 1811, and is a two-story, brick dwelling associated with the German settlement of piedmont North Carolina. It features bold diamond-pattern brickwork and a handsome clock/sundial on the front elevation. Also on the property are the contributing frame smokehouse, frame corn crib, (c. 1920), and the remains of a granite well base.

It was listed on the National Register of Historic Places in 1984.
