= James Graham Ramsay =

North Carolina politician and physician

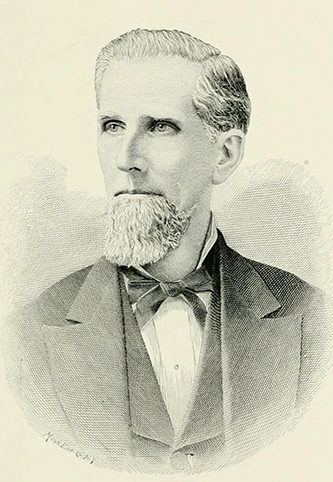

Member of the North Carolina Senate representing Rowan and Davie County
- In office 1856–1864

Personal details
- Born: March 1, 1823 Iredell County, North Carolina, U.S.
- Died: January 10, 1903 (aged 79) Raleigh, North Carolina, U.S.
- Party: Whig, Republican
- Spouse: Sarah Jane Foster (1828–1895)
- Profession: Physician

James Graham Ramsay (March 1, 1823 – January 10, 1903) was a North Carolina physician and politician who served in the North Carolina Senate and Confederate States Congress during the American Civil War.

== Biography ==
Ramsay was born on his parents' (David Ramsay and Margaret Foster (Graham) Ramsay) plantation in the Coddle Creek area of Iredell County, North Carolina. He received an education from local schools and then attended Davidson College, where he graduated in 1841. After teaching for a year and studying privately for medical school, he attended Thomas Jefferson Medical College in Philadelphia where he graduated with a medical degree in 1848. He opened a medical practice on his estate, Palermo, near the town of Cleveland, North Carolina, where he practiced for 51 years. In 1849, he was elected the first president of the Rowan County medical society, which he helped form. He owned a small farm and had slaves before the U.S. Civil War. He lived in Scotch Irish Township until 1900 when he was living with his son, James Hill Ramsay, in Salisbury, North Carolina. He died in Salisbury. He is buried in the Third Creek Presbyterian Church cemetery near Cleveland, North Carolina. It was added to the National Register of Historic Places in 1983.

He married Sarah Jane Foster on September 23, 1846 in Mocksville, Davie County, North Carolina. James and Sarah had eight children: Margaret Foster (Ramsay) Nelson, Florence May Ramsay, David Allen Ramsay, James Hill Ramsay, Edgar Burton Ramsay, William G. Ramsay, Robert L. Ramsay, and Claudius Clinton.

== Political career ==
He served in the North Carolina Senate from 1856 to 1864 and again in 1883. He represented the state in the Second Confederate Congress. He was a member of Whig party. He was a member of the Medical Department and Naval Affairs committees in the Confederate Congress of North Carolina. He supported state and individual rights over the needs of the Confederate war efforts while serving in the Senate. He voted in favor of a convention to return North Carolina to the Union by April 1865. After the War, he became a Republican and was a Presidential elector in 1872.

He lost two races for the United States House of Representatives during Reconstruction—in 1865 (losing to Samuel H. Walkup, who was not seated by the House) and in 1884 (losing to John S. Henderson).
