= Mount Vernon (Woodleaf, North Carolina) =

Historic farm in North Carolina, United States

- U.S. National Register of Historic Places
- U.S. Historic district
- Location within North Carolina Location within the United States
- Location: SR 1003 and SR 1986, near Woodleaf, North Carolina
- Coordinates: 35°47′18″N 80°38′40″W
- Area: 29.5 acres (11.9 ha)
- Built: c. 1822
- Architectural style: Federal
- NRHP reference No.: 80002899
- Added to NRHP: May 27, 1980

Mount Vernon is a historic plantation house, farm complex, and national historic district located near Woodleaf, in Scotch Irish Township, Rowan County, North Carolina. The house was built about 1822, and is a two-story, three-bay, Federal style frame dwelling. It is sheathed in weatherboard and has a full-width, one-story shed roofed porch. The house was designated a post office in 1822. Also on the property are the contributing log smokehouse, large barn (c. 1898), "lighthouse" or Delco house (c. 1917), corn crib (c. 1917), gear house (c. 1917), woodhouse (c. 1917), spring house, mill site, shop, and plantation office.

It was listed on the National Register of Historic Places in 1980.

== History ==
Mount Vernon was the plantation home of Capt. Jacob Krider (1788–1874), who had this plantation built in 1822. Capt. Krider was born in Pennsylvania on August 17, 1788, and moved to Salisbury, North Carolina with his family after 1800. He served in a North Carolina militia unit that fought the Creek Indians in the later part of the War of 1812. A post office was established at Mount Vernon on May 27, 1822, with Jacob Krider as the first postmaster. Jacob Krider's father-in-law, Daniel Wood, established a mill near site of the plantation earlier and Jacob continued operation of the mill. A general merchandise store was also operated on the plantation. The ownership of the plantation remained in the Krider family until the 1891 after the death of Jacob's son, Charles C. Krider (1826–1890). The plantation was sold to Emory N. Teague (1867–1904) in 1892. Teague operated the mill with his brother-in-law, Richard C. Current (1859–1938). Current acquired Teague's interest in the mill and plantation. In 1903, Richard C. Current was running the mill at the Mount Vernon plantation. Current's heirs continued to own the plantation well into the 20th century.

== See also ==
- Scotch Irish Township, Rowan County, North Carolina
- Map of Scotch Irish Township in 1903
