= Shuping's Mill Complex =

- U.S. National Register of Historic Places
- Location within North Carolina Location within the United States
- Location: S of Faith on NC 152, near Faith, North Carolina
- Coordinates: 35°33′4″N 80°29′0″W
- Area: 4.5 acres (1.8 ha)
- Built: c. 1895
- NRHP reference No.: 82003506
- Added to NRHP: September 23, 1982

Shuping's Mill Complex was a historic grist mill complex located near Faith, Rowan County, North Carolina. The complex included a two-story frame dwelling, flour and corn mill building, cotton gin house (1895), and two other contributing buildings. The mill was built in 1900, and was a 2 1/2-story frame building sheathed in weatherboard and on a stone foundation. It was destroyed in 1986 when a car crash sparked a fire. The original boiler still remains on the property.

It was listed on the National Register of Historic Places in 1982.
