= East Spencer Graded School =

Destroyed school building in North Carolina, United States

- U.S. National Register of Historic Places
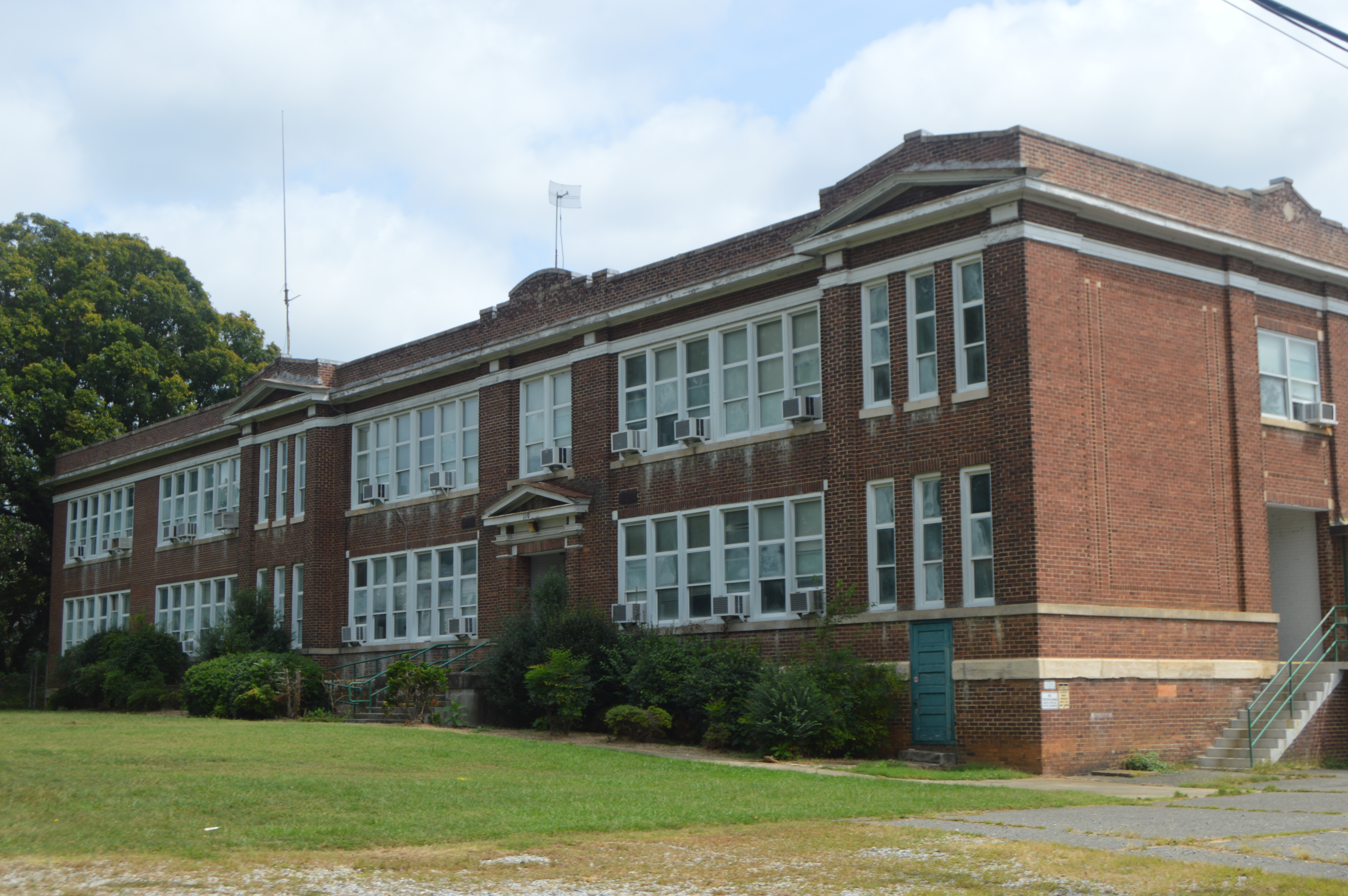
- East Spencer Graded School, East Spencer, NC

- Location within North Carolina Location within the United States
- Location: 110 S. Long St., East Spencer, North Carolina
- Coordinates: 35.683056°N 80.669167°W
- Built: 1909, 1921
- Architectural style: Classical revival
- NRHP reference No.: 100002050
- Added to NRHP: 2018-01-25

East Spencer Graded School was a historic school in East Spencer, North Carolina.

A one-story building with three classrooms went up in 1909, and an addition was made in 1913. A two-story Classical Revival building designed by Charles C. Hook was built in 1921, with a north classroom section and auditorium designed by Yoe, Northup and O’Brien in 1937.

The town's only school for white students housed all grades until the completion of North Rowan High School in 1958, after which East Spencer School housed grades one through eight. As new schools opened, students were sent to those schools, with the last students moving to North Rowan Middle School in 1974. After the school closed, the Rowan County Schools took over the building for its offices and converted the auditorium to a meeting room.

By 2012, efforts were under way to build new offices for the school system, which had five locations. The 88-year-old East Spencer building, according to structural consultants, "far exceeded the useful service life."

The first offices for the consolidated school system opened in Salisbury in 2016. Even before school system offices moved out, a 2015 study by the UNC School of Government Development showed possible uses were residential, office and retail. The town of East Spencer bought the buildings in 2016. The buildings were used for storage, events and meetings, and a community garden was out front. Plans for low-income housing fell through, though developer Landmark Group completed and paid for the application for the National Register of Historic Places. A 2019 Salisbury Post article said that according to the application, "[b]oth buildings are intact and increasingly rare examples of early 20th-century institutional architecture."

On January 7, 2023, a 5-alarm fire destroyed the main building. East Spencer police chief John Fewell said an investigation showed "juveniles" accidentally set the fire. As of May, the building that burned had been demolished and plans were being made for a community center in the remaining building.
