= Third Creek Presbyterian Church and Cemetery =

Historic site in Rowan County, North Carolina, US

- U.S. National Register of Historic Places
- Location within North Carolina Location within the United States
- Location: SR 1973, near Cleveland, North Carolina
- Coordinates: 35°45′39″N 80°41′4″W
- Area: 18.2 acres (7.4 ha)
- Built: 1835
- Architect: Lyles, D.; Austin, H.
- NRHP reference No.: 83001912
- Added to NRHP: July 21, 1983

Third Creek Presbyterian Church and Cemetery is a historic Presbyterian church and cemetery located near Cleveland, Rowan County, North Carolina. The cemetery was added to the National Register of Historic Places in 1983.

== History ==
The congregation was founded in 1751 and the first meeting house was located in the center of what is now the cemetery. The current church building was constructed in 1835. It is a two-story, brick building. Also on the property is the Session House, a one-story gabled roof weather-boarded log building also dating from 1835.

== Gravesites ==
The earliest surviving gravestones in the cemetery date from 1776. One notable burial is James Graham Ramsay (1823–1903).

The most famous and unique gravesite is of a thin tombstone enclosed in a brick box with glass for viewing that is believed to be of French military commander Marshal Michel Ney who served in Napoleon Bonaparte's army during the Napoleonic Wars. Local folklore claims that Ney was living under the false name of "Peter Stuart Ney" as the town's schoolteacher. The plaque reads, "In Memory of Peter Stewart Ney a native of France and soldier of the French Revolution under Napoleon Bonaparte who departed this life November 15th, 1846 aged 77 years."
