= Shaver Rental Houses District =

Historic houses in North Carolina, United States

- U.S. National Register of Historic Places
- U.S. Historic district
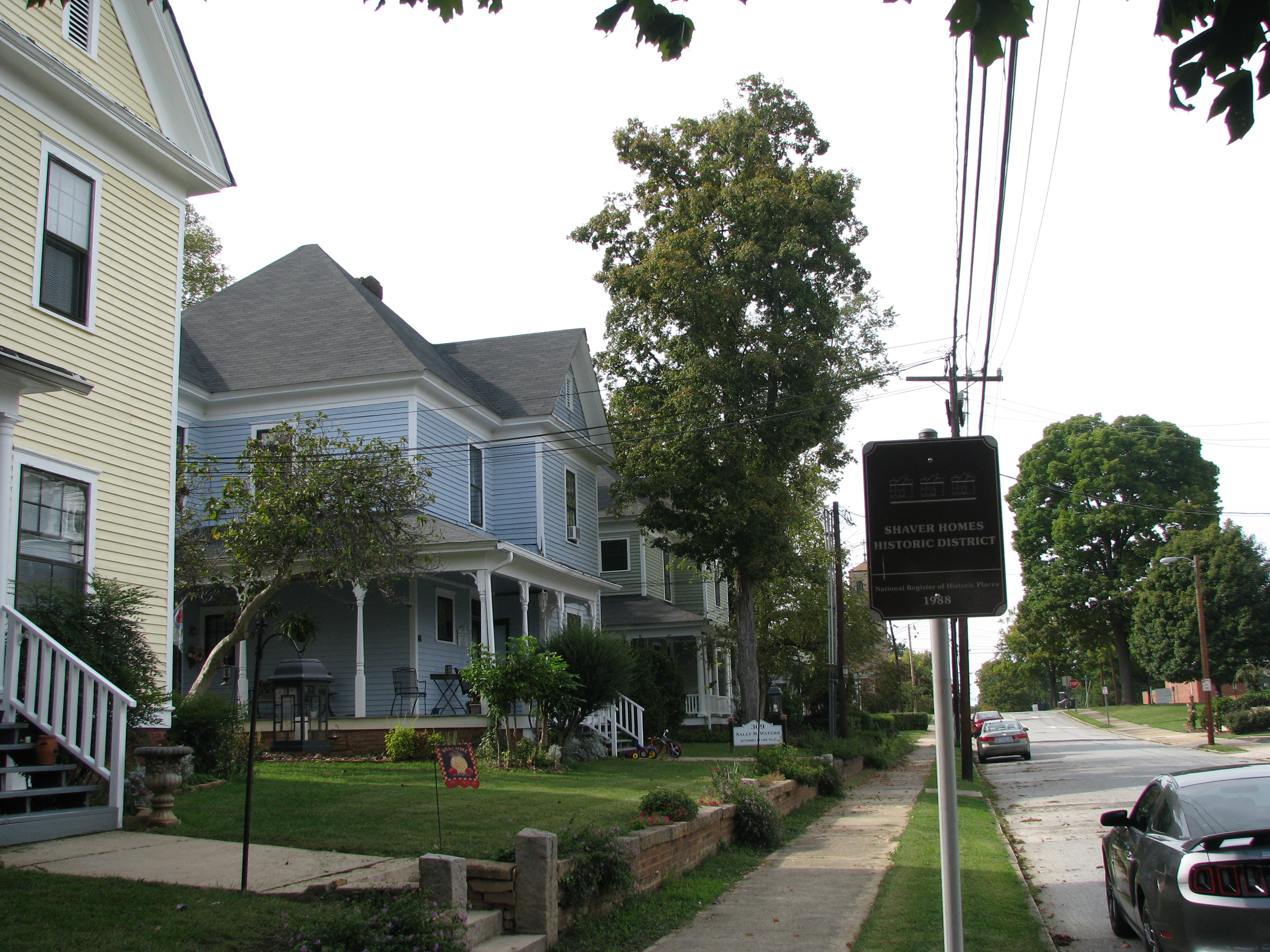
- Shaver Rental Houses, September 2012

- Location within North Carolina Location within the United States
- Location: 303, 309 & 315 W. Council & 120 N. Jackson, Salisbury, North Carolina
- Coordinates: 35°40′12″N 80°28′17″W
- Area: 0.7 acres (0.28 ha)
- Built: 1899-1910
- Architectural style: Queen Anne
- NRHP reference No.: 87002233
- Added to NRHP: January 12, 1988

Shaver Rental Houses District is a national historic district located at Salisbury, Rowan County, North Carolina. The district encompasses four contributing buildings built as rental housing between 1899 and 1910. They are one- and two-story, Queen Anne style frame dwellings. Three of the houses on West Council Street feature asymmetrical massing, steeply pitched hipped roofs with cross gables, and one-story wraparound porches.

It was listed on the National Register of Historic Places in 1988.
