= Napoleon Bonaparte McCanless House =

Historic house in North Carolina, United States

- U.S. National Register of Historic Places
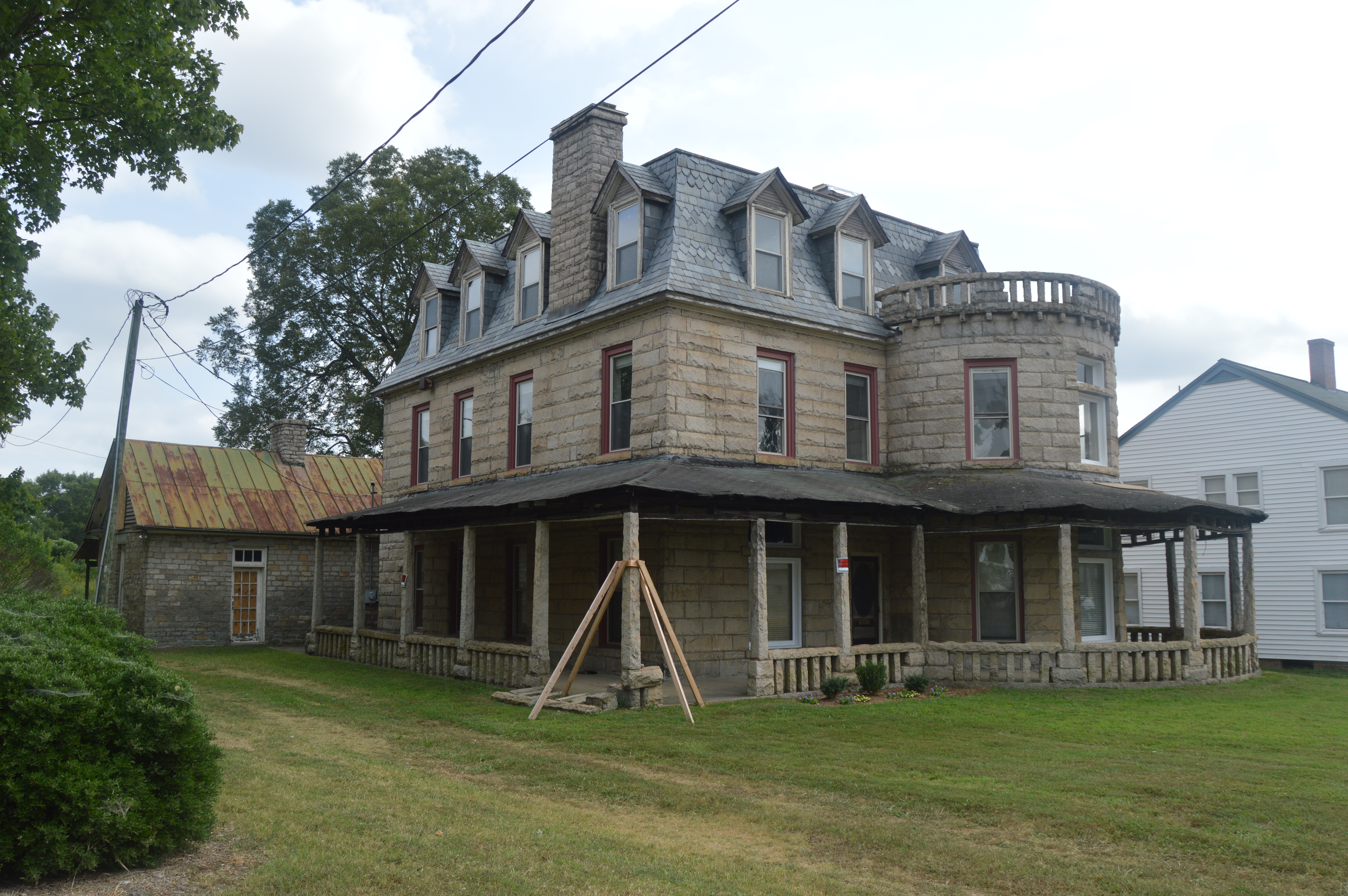
- Front and northeastern side

- Location within North Carolina Location within the United States
- Location: 619 S. Main St., Salisbury, North Carolina
- Coordinates: 35°39′44.6″N 80°28′32.9″W
- Area: 0.378 acres (0.153 ha)
- Built: 1897
- Architectural style: Second Empire
- NRHP reference No.: 14000264
- Added to NRHP: May 22, 2014

Napoleon Bonaparte McCanless House is a historic home located at Salisbury, Rowan County, North Carolina. It is a three-story, three-bay by four-bay, Second Empire-style dwelling with some Colonial Revival features, faced with rusticated granite. It has a rounded corner tower and a steep, concave, mansard roof sheathed in decorative slate shingles. Also on the property is a one-story, granite-veneered brick outbuilding believed to have been the kitchen.

== History ==
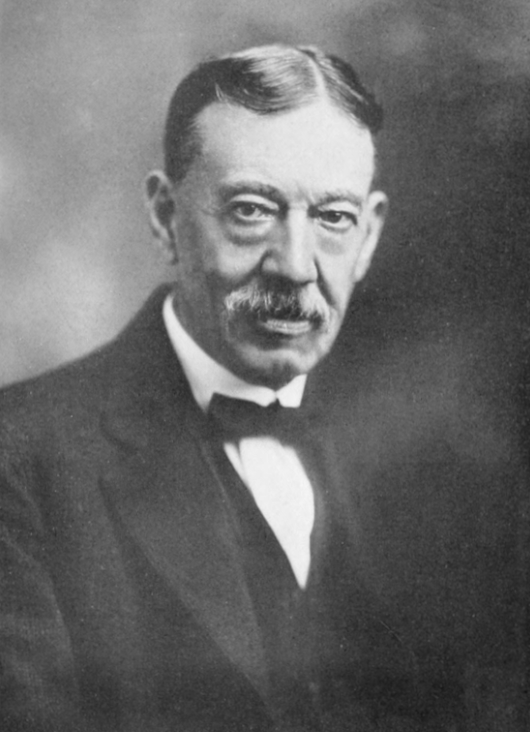
Napoleon Bonaparte McCanless

Napoleon B. McCanless (1851 Gold Hill, Rowan Co. – 1920 Salisbury) was a prominent entrepreneur in the region, president of the Halifax Cotton Mill Co., and held interests in agriculture, manufacturing, construction, banking, and mining (the granite used for the house's facing representing his involvement in the last). Other commercial projects he was involved with in and around Salisbury include Vance Cotton Mill, Kesler Cotton Mill, North Side Cotton Mill, the Doggin (or Coggin) Mines Co., Yadkin Finishing Co., Harris Granite Co., Salisbury Savings Bank, Peoples National Bank (later Security Bank and Trust), Salisbury Electric Light & Street Railway Co., Salisbury–Monroe Railroad, the Washington Building, Central Hotel, and the Empire Hotel, among various other businesses.

His home was added to the National Register of Historic Places in 2014.

In June 2019, Historic Salisbury Foundation purchased the house for $160,000 from Livingstone College, which had once planned to use the house for a culinary school later housed at a former Holiday Inn. It was one of four remaining significant houses on South Main Street. The house had been worked on for a restaurant by a series of owners, before the college, in what has been described as "an aborted remodeling effort" that may have done more harm than good By the time of the foundation's purchase, it was in poor shape and cleanup work would be needed before another restoration. The foundation put the property up for sale for $225,000 in "as-is" condition in 2021.

In January 2021, Historic Salisbury Foundation entered (despite efforts to sell the property) into a three-year partnership with the Ghost Guild, a registered nonprofit organization that investigates alleged ghost sightings, to explore reports of unexplained activity in and around the property. The Ghost Guild said it examined the Napoleon Bonaparte McCanless House several times per year and presented its findings as part of the Historic Salisbury Foundation's annual October Tour.

Sandra Toscano and C.P. Edgar bought the house for $180,000 in 2021 and opened it as a wedding and event venue and bed and breakfast in September 2025. Renovation took 10 months, but not everything that made the house historic could be saved. The owners hoped to find a way to recreate a Rococo mural

== See also ==
- Walter McCanless House, the much larger Salisbury historic home of N. B. McCanless's son
