= Woodleaf, North Carolina =

- Unincorporated community
- Location within North Carolina Location within the United States
- Coordinates: 35°46′09″N 80°35′27″W
- Country: United States
- State: North Carolina
- County: Rowan
- Elevation: 804 ft (245 m)
- Time zone: UTC-5 (Eastern (EST))
  - Summer (DST): UTC-4 (EDT)
- ZIP code: 27054
- Area codes: 704 & 980
- GNIS feature ID: 997599

Woodleaf is an unincorporated community in Unity Township, Rowan County, North Carolina, United States. The community is located on North Carolina Highway 801, 9.5 miles (15.3 km) northwest of Salisbury. Woodleaf has a post office with ZIP code 27054.

== History ==
The Mount Vernon site and St. Andrew's Episcopal Church and Cemetery are located near the Woodleaf community and are listed on the National Register of Historic Places.

Woodl Leaf post office was established on September 4, 1855. The first postmaster was Daniel Wood. The post office name was changed to Woodleaf in 1877.
