= China Grove Roller Mill =

Historic mill building in North Carolina, US

- U.S. National Register of Historic Places
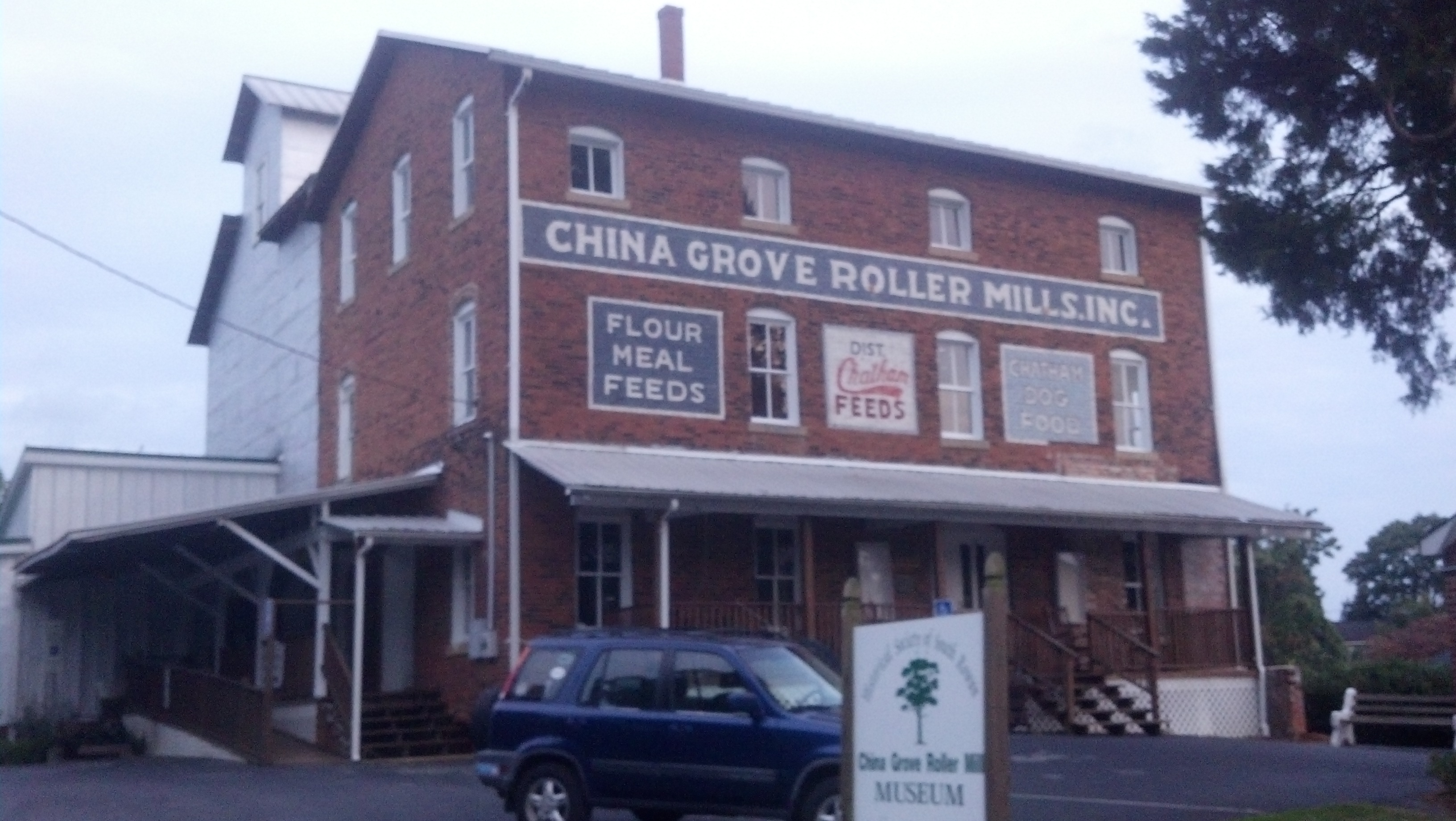
- China Grove Roller Mill, September 2012

- Location within North Carolina Location within the United States
- Location: 308 N. Main St., China Grove, North Carolina
- Coordinates: 35°34′16″N 80°34′41″W
- Area: 0.7 acres (0.28 ha)
- Built: 1903
- NRHP reference No.: 83003995
- Added to NRHP: December 29, 1983

China Grove Roller Mill is a historic roller mill building located at China Grove, Rowan County, North Carolina. It was built in 1903, and is a three-story rectangular brick building, with several later additions. It retains the intact original milling machinery.

It was listed on the National Register of Historic Places in 1983.
