= Grubb–Sigmon–Weisiger House =

Historic house in North Carolina, United States

- U.S. National Register of Historic Places
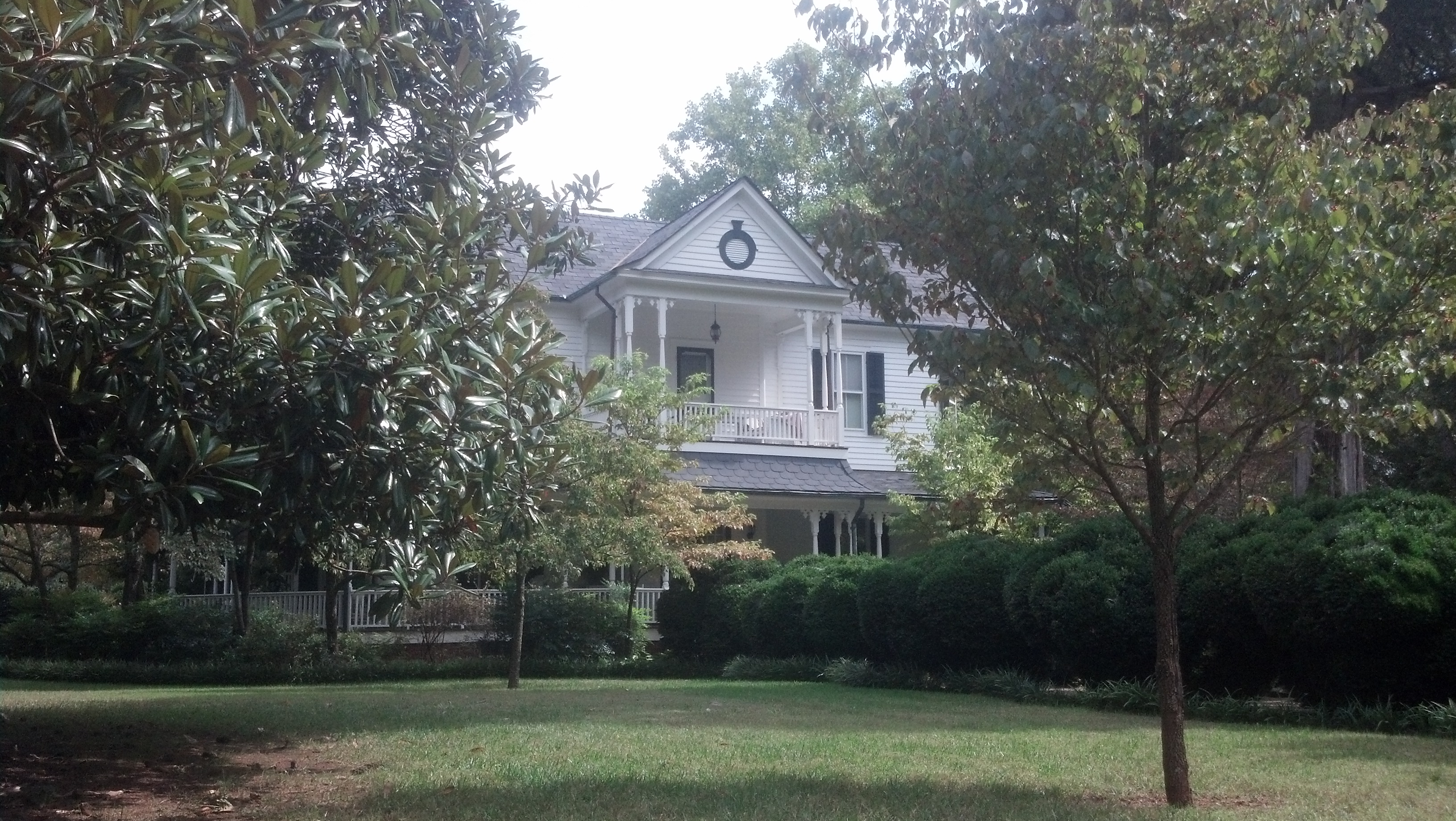
- Grubb–Sigmon–Weisiger House, September 2012

- Location within North Carolina Location within the United States
- Location: 213 McCoy Rd., Salisbury, North Carolina
- Coordinates: 35°41′15″N 80°30′6″W
- Area: 2.9 acres (1.2 ha)
- Built: 1911, 1927, 1939
- Architectural style: Queen Anne, Colonial Revival
- NRHP reference No.: 99000198
- Added to NRHP: February 12, 1999

The Grubb–Sigmon–Weisiger House, also known as the Grubb–Grimes–Sigmon House, is a historic home located at Salisbury, Rowan County, North Carolina. It was built in 1911, and is a large two-story, Queen Anne style frame dwelling. It is sheathed in weatherboard and has a wraparound porch. It was rotated 90 degrees to its present orientation in 1927, and the interiors redesigned in the Colonial Revival style in 1939. Other contributing resources are the guest house (c. 1941), playhouse (c. 1928–1930), a garage / stable (c. 1927), truck-garage / workshop (c. 1942), smokehouse (c. 1942), and greenhouse (c. 1933).

It was listed on the National Register of Historic Places in 1999.
