= Ellis Street Graded School Historic District =

Historic district in North Carolina, United States

- U.S. National Register of Historic Places
- U.S. Historic district
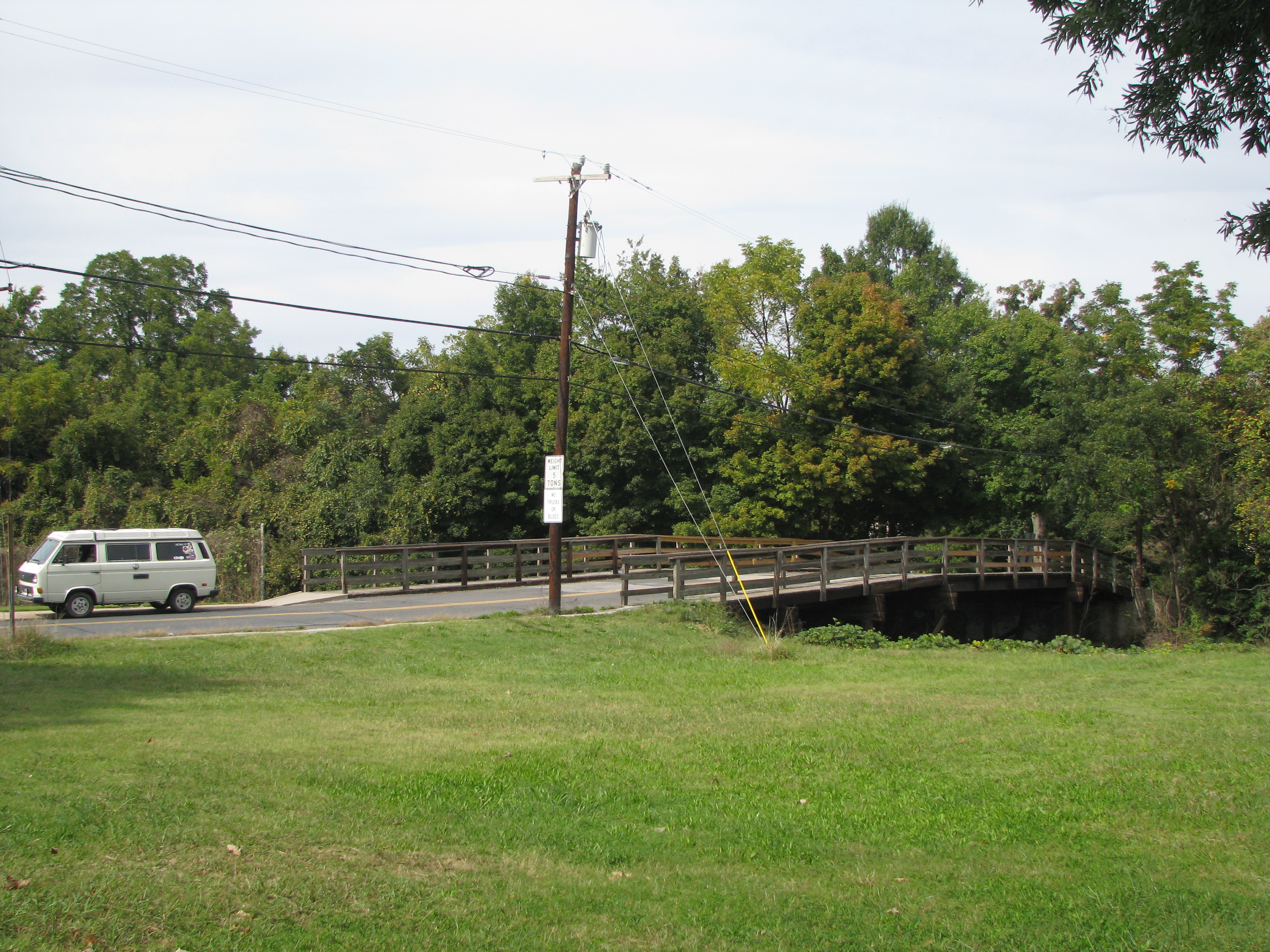
- Shober Bridge, September 2012

- Location within North Carolina Location within the United States
- Location: Roughly bounded by Graig, Innes, Jackson, and Cemetery Sts., Salisbury, North Carolina
- Coordinates: 35°40′20″N 80°28′14″W
- Area: 24 acres (9.7 ha)
- Built: 1867
- Architect: Rankin, Frank A.; et.al.
- Architectural style: Bungalow/craftsman, Italianate
- NRHP reference No.: 99000273
- Added to NRHP: March 5, 1999

Ellis Street Graded School Historic District is a national historic district located at Salisbury, Rowan County, North Carolina. The district encompasses 76 contributing buildings and 1 contributing structure in a predominantly residential section of Salisbury. They were built between about 1867 and 1948, and include notable examples of Italianate and Bungalow / American Craftsman style architecture. Notable contributing resources include the Ellis Street Graded School building (1881) and Shober Bridge (c. 1940).

It was listed on the National Register of Historic Places in 1999.
