= Mount Ulla Township, Rowan County, North Carolina =

Mount Ulla
- Township
- Mount Ulla emblem
- Motto: Faith. Family. Farms
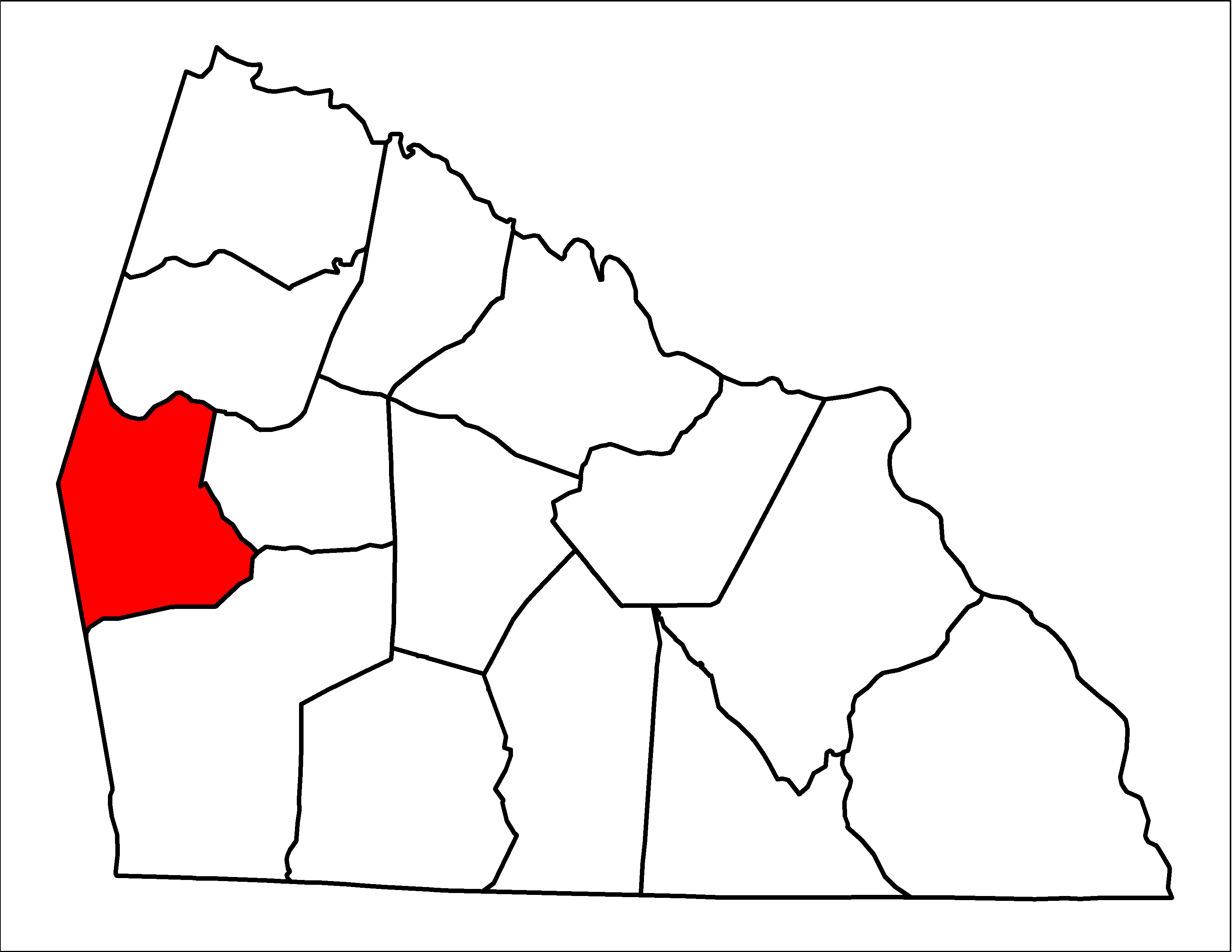
- Location of Mount Ulla Township in Rowan County, N.C.

- Location in the United States
- Coordinates: 35°39′32″N 80°43′38″W
- Country: United States
- State: North Carolina
- County: Rowan
- Settled: 1740s
- Named for: Ulaid
- Time zone: Eastern (EST) (UTC-5)
- ZIP code: 28125
- Area codes: 704, 980
- GNIS feature ID: 990591, 1027149

Mount Ulla Township is one of fourteen townships in Rowan County, North Carolina, United States. It is currently the smallest township in Rowan County by population.

== Geography ==
=== Disambiguation ===
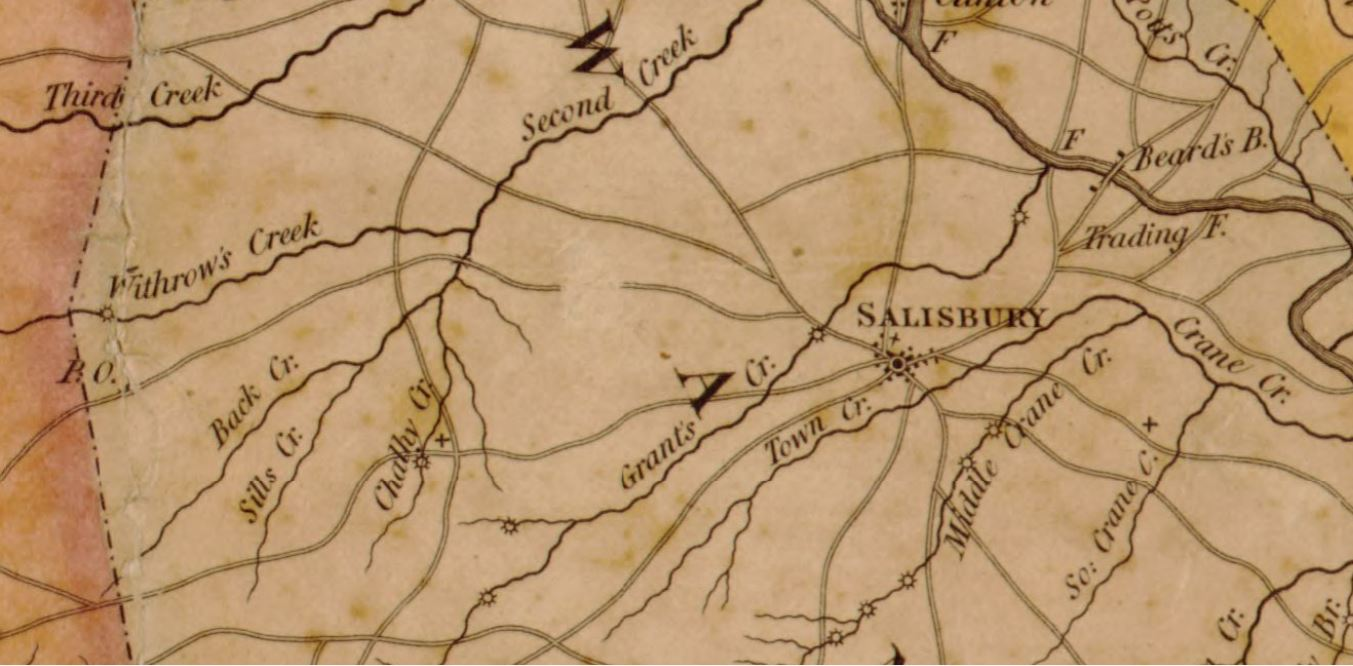
Area of Rowan County in 1833 where Mount Ulla township was created in 1868, including creeks, roads, towns, and Cathey's Creek Meeting House.

Mount Ulla may refer to several geographical entities:

- Mount Ulla unincorporated
- Mount Ulla Township (created in 1868)
- the area with Mount Ulla zip code and/or address
- the areas outside of Mount Ulla township and/or zip code boundaries that are marked as Mount Ulla in historical or contemporary documents, accounts, and memoirs.

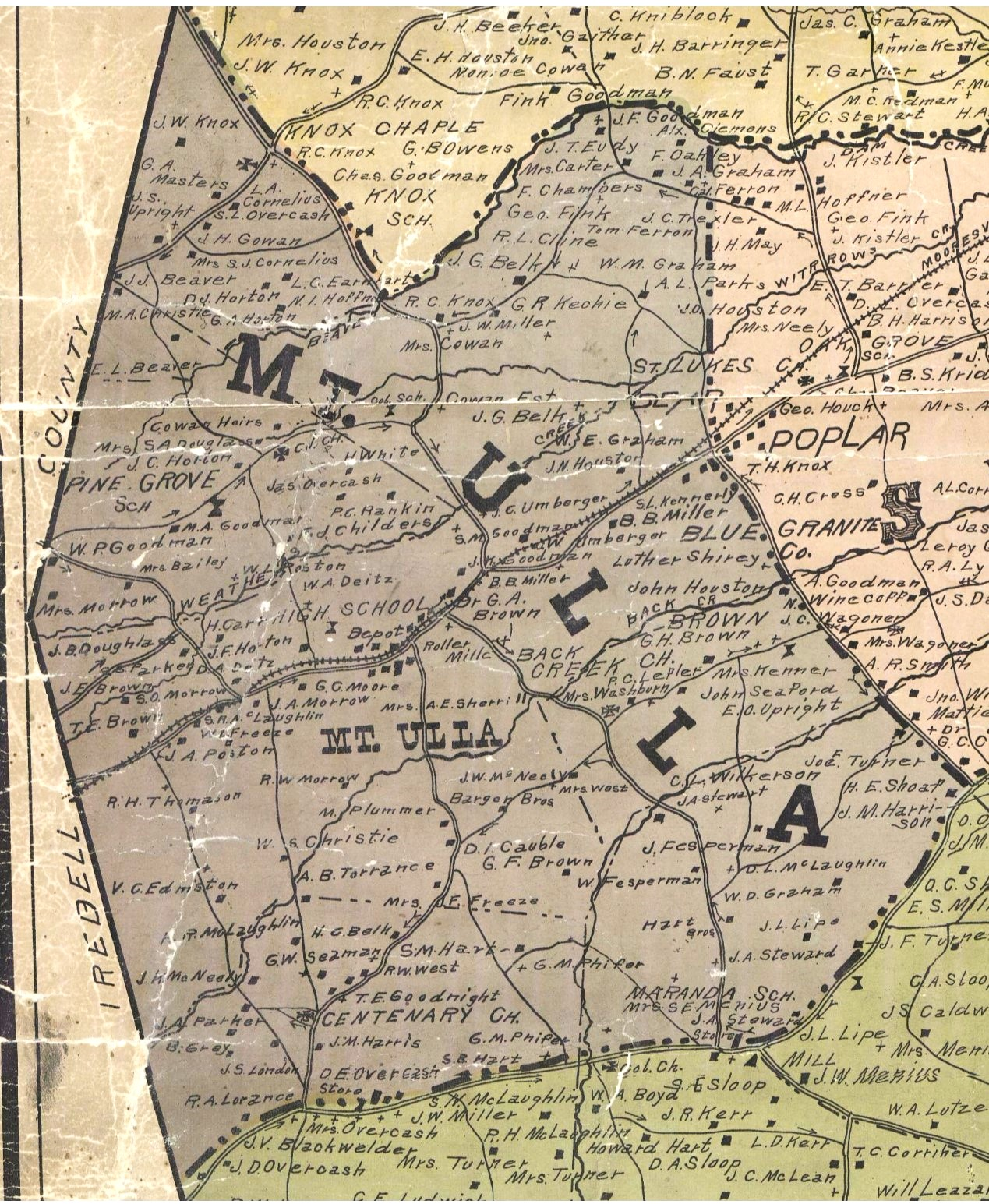
1903 Map of homes, churches, and schools in Mount Ulla Township

The community of Mount Ulla does not have clearly defined boundaries. The community is smaller in area than the administrative township or the area that lists Mount Ulla as its address.

The Mount Ulla Township is a legislatively defunct administrative subdivision for voting precincts, tax-listings, and census districts thus does not coincide or reflect local inhabitants historical perception of Mount Ulla boundaries. It consists of several unincorporated communities such as Mount Ulla and part of Bear Poplar. Mount Ulla Township was formed after the Civil War by the requirements of the North Carolina Constitution of 1868. Previous to that time, the subdivisions were Captain's Districts from the time of the American Revolution. While the Captain's Districts referred primarily to the militia, it served also for the election precinct, the tax listing and tax collecting district. Mount Ulla Township was mentioned on Shaffer's Township map of North Carolina in 1886.

Mount Ulla zip code area has an outline that does not coincide with Mount Ulla Township boundaries. It stretches into Iredell county communities such as Mazeppa, does not come as far north as the township's border, stretches into Steele township in the east, Atwell Township in the southeast, and reaches down past township's southern boundary along NC-150 into Atwell township. As a result, a number of historic communities become part of the larger Mount Ulla community - Miranda and parts of Mill Bridge.

Due to the ambiguous and arbitrary nature of boundaries in rural Rowan county communities, historical and contemporary documents at times record location as Mount Ulla when the location may belong to a neighboring community in other documents or may carry a different geographical address.

=== Location ===
Mount Ulla Township is located in the Piedmont region, western Rowan County, North Carolina, United States. Its outline is defined by natural and man-made landmarks. Township's Northern boundary follows in the vicinity of Knox Road, Knox School Road, and Beaverdam Creek, stopping short of Back Creek Church Road. The Eastern border zigzags its way to North Carolina Highway 801, follows NC-801 to Graham Road, Lyerly Road, Upright Road, and Sloan Road. The Southern border neatly follows North Carolina Highway 150. The Western border coincides with the administrative line between Iredell and Rowan counties. Mount Ulla Township occupies 28.52 square miles (73.9 km^{2}).

=== Topography ===
Mount Ulla area landscape is typical for Piedmont plateau - rolling hills with elevations up to 800 (250 meters) above sea level punctuated by springs that feed into Beaverdam, Withrow, Back, and Sills creeks, which flow to the South Yadkin River.

=== Geology ===
Mount Ulla is located in Charlotte Belt of western Piedmont Plateau geological region. It is characterized by Paleozoic era intrusive rock formations - granitic rock, quartz, diorite, and gabbro. The soils are predominantly yellowish to brownish red sandy clay loam and dark brown clay loam, Cecil-Pacolet and Hiwassee-Mecklenburg respectively.

=== Climate ===
The latitude of Mount Ulla is 35.6580828 degrees North. According to Köppen climate classification, the climate is temperate humid subtropical with four distinct seasons. According to United States Department of Agriculture Plant Hardiness Zone map Mount Ulla is 7b zone.

Climate data for Mount Ulla, N.C. (1983-2018)
Month	Jan	Feb	Mar	Apr	May	Jun	Jul	Aug	Sep	Oct	Nov	Dec	Year
Mean daily maximum °F (°C)	49 (9)	54 (12)	61 (16)	70 (21)	78 (26)	85 (29)	86 (30)	87 (31)	81 (27)	69 (21)	60 (16)	51 (11)	69 (21)
Mean daily minimum °F (°C)	26 (−3)	30 (−1)	36 (2)	45 (7)	55 (13)	64 (18)	65 (18)	66 (19)	59 (15)	44 (7)	35 (2)	28 (−2)	46 (8)
Average precipitation inches (mm)	3.42 (87)	3.17 (81)	4.05 (103)	3.78 (96)	3.56 (90)	3.98 (101)	3.37 (86)	3.99 (101)	3.79 (96)	3.26 (83)	3.21 (82)	3.33 (85)	42.91 (1,091)
Source: Rowan Research Station

=== Flora ===
Mount Ulla township is a heavily developed agricultural community of pastures and crop fields. Agricultural activity reduced native plant population and introduced foreign species that became invasive. In the 1750s the area "was not a primeval forest, but instead a vast prairie of peavines and great stretches of grass and cane-breaks. Scarcely a shrub could be seen, and game abounded".

==== Native flora ====
Natural forest growth consisted of red, white, and post oak, shortleaf pine, hickory, poplar, elm, dogwood, sourwood, cedar, black and sweetgum, locust, walnut, sassafras, pawpaw, and persimmon. Native perennials include common blue violet, dogfennel, passion flower (maypop), pokeweed, wild garlic.

==== Agricultural and horticultural flora ====
Agricultural crops evolve with time. In the beginning of the 20th century cotton and tobacco were popular. In the 21st century Mount Ulla farmers grow corn, barley, wheat, soy, and sorghum.

==== Weed flora ====
Local weed flora can be divided into two categories - non-native plants that have become invasive and threaten native flora as well as native southeastern North American plants if they interfere with intended and desirable plant growth. Some pasture weeds that were introduced from Europe are Canada thistle, chickweed, clover, corn speedwell, cornflower, dandelion, deptford pink, field sorrel, henbit, lambsquarters, Queen Anne's lace. Invasive weed grasses found in Mount Ulla vicinity are crabgrass, Bermuda grass. Invasive vines are kudzu and Japanese honeysuckle. Invasive trees include Bradford pear and mimosa.

== History ==
=== Etymology ===
Presumably, Mount Ulla was named for a village in Ireland called Oola (Ulla in Irish spelling). According to a different source, Rev. Andrew Y. Lockridge (1801–1876), the second minister at the Back Creek Presbyterian Church, named the community in 1830. The reasons for the name remain unknown but it is believed it is of literary origin since Rev. Lockridge was an ardent student of literature. There is speculation that Rev. Lockridge named the community in reference to a biblical man Ulla in the Book of Chronicles 7:39.

There is a new hypothesis that Mount Ulla was named after Ulaid, a Gaelic over-kingdom in north-eastern Ireland during the Middle Ages. Ulaid gave its name to the province of Ulster, the ancestral homeplace of the Scotch-Irish settlers in Mount Ulla vicinity.

Mount Ulla Post Office was established on 22 April 1843, a name change for Wood Grove Post Office established on 12 April 1830. The first Mount Ulla postmaster was James Cowan. This post office closed on 24 October 1899 and mail was transferred to Rowan Post Office nearby. The Rowan Post Office (which opened on 24 January 1889) was renamed to Mount Ulla Post Office on 22 November 1899 with Adam E. Sherrill as postmaster. In 1846 Mount Ulla in Rowan County appeared in the Table of Post Offices in the United States. In 1894, the name of the post office was seen written as Mountulla.

=== Emblem ===
In December 2019 Mount Ulla Historic Preservation Society unveiled the sign paying respect to the historic nature of Mount Ulla. A Ukrainian designer Nazar Burega created the sign. Rich symbolism of the emblem pays tribute to Scots-Irish Presbyterians and German Lutherans who settled the area in the mid-1700s.

=== Exploration and colonization ===
Prior to European colonization, Western Rowan, where Mount Ulla is located, was the home of Native Americans. In February 1567, Spanish explorer Juan Pardo visited a Native American settlement of Guatari, near present-day Salisbury. War, disease, and forced resettlement during Andrew Jackson's presidency led to the extinction of native people in the area.

==== The First Carolana Charter ====
Long before it was known as Mount Ulla, the land became an English colony. In October 1629, King Charles I of England granted to his Attorney General, Sir Robert Heath, the territory between 31 degrees and 36 degrees North latitude in the New World. This is the region lying from about thirty miles north of the Florida state line to the southern side of Albemarle Sound in North Carolina. It was incorporated under the name Province of Carolana. There is a hypothesis that French Huguenots sought the colony as a haven from persecution. The plans to plant the colony never materialized, thus presented a case for a failed colonization attempt.

==== The Carolina Charter of 1663 ====
In March 1663 King Charles II of England issued a new charter for the vast territory from the southern border of the Virginia Colony at 36 degrees north to 31 degrees north to eight English noblemen who were his strong supports in restoration to the throne after the English Civil War and Oliver Cromwell's decade long rule of England. The new eight rulers of the province of Carolina became known as Lords Proprietor. The charter gave the Proprietors power to plant colonies, to create and fill offices, to erect counties and other administrative subdivisions, and other rights and privileges. The rights of the people were set forth as well as the common rights of Englishmen. They were guaranteed English personal and property rights, liberty of conscience, and all liberties and rights enjoyed by King's subjects residing in England. Settling of the province of Carolina was a difficult enterprise. None of the original Lords Proprietor ever set foot in the colony thus had little understanding of the territory over which they held enormous power. Two of the Proprietors failed to contribute their shares to development of the colony. Men sent over as Governors never held any office making ruling of the new colony even more difficult. False promises and demand to pay quit-rent in sterling rather than marketable commodities contributed to discord and confusion in the new colony. As a result of this, there was difficulty enforcing English law, laws were passed that conflicted with English law, piracy and smuggling flourished, currency had become almost worthless, manufacturing was competing with English industry. Collection of quit-rent on land granted to colonists was a continual problem. The Proprietors were disillusioned in their quest to gain quick riches in the province of Carolina. In 1712 Carolina colony split into two separate provinces South and North Carolina. By 1729 shares of only three original Proprietors remained in the hands of the families of their original owners and nearly fifty individuals owned or claimed to own the original eight shares. Advisers to the Crown were more interesting in gaining control of the colony.

==== Granville District ====
In 1728 seven of eight Lords Proprietor drew up and offer to surrender their interests in Carolina to King Charles II. In 1729 almost all of North Carolina became a royal colony. One Lord Proprietor who did not surrender his rights to the land in Carolina was John Carteret, 2nd Earl Granville, a great-grandson of Sir George Carteret who was one of the eight original Lords Proprietor to the province of Carolina. John Carteret's share consisted of the country lying south of the Virginia border to 35.4 degrees north latitude. The south boundary was surveyed from the coast to Bath in 1743, then to the corner of what is now Chatham County, on Deep River. In 1746, the line was extended westward to Coldwater Creek at a point approximately fourteen miles southwest of the present site of Salisbury. This area became known as Granville District.

The section of Granville district lying between the Yadkin and Catawba rivers was described by contemporaries as fertile, well-watered, virtually treeless meadowland. Myriads of little rivulets, combining to form large creeks, flowed from countless sequestered springs. Earlier 17th century colonial settlers usually established themselves along the navigable rivers because communication with England was important. In 18th century when immigrants began to settle the backcountry of North Carolina, land travel prevailed. Home sites increasingly began springing up along the upper reaches of creeks. Each home place nearly always included a fresh water spring providing one source of water for people and one for the animals. It was common practice on the frontier for important creeks to bear the name of the first man to settle upon them. Withrow Creek and Sills Creek in the vicinity of Mount Ulla serve as reminders of the frontier pioneers who settled the area by mid-eighteenth century.

==== The Irish Settlement ====
The first recorded settlement on the lands of present-day Mount Ulla bears the name "The Irish Settlement" of 1747–1749. The homesteads were set up in the headwaters of Second Creek along Beaverdam, Withrows, Gillespies (present day Back Creek), and Sills Creeks in what was Bladen County at the time. By 1750 there were enough settlers to form a new administrative division on the frontier - Anson County. In 1753 three hundred and fifty residents of Anson county petitioned to the North Carolina legislature to form Rowan County, where Mount Ulla remains to this day.

The area that became known as Mount Ulla was settled largely by the descendants of Scotch-Irish (also known as Ulster Scots), an ethnic group of mostly Protestant Scottish people who migrated to Ulster, Ireland as part of planned colonization of Ireland sanctioned by of James VI of Scotland and I of England. Scotch-Irish immigrants to West Rowan came from the original colonial settlements in Pennsylvania and Virginia travelling down Great Wagon Road. Along with the Scotch-Irish came another nationality - the Germans aka Pennsylvania Dutch.

=== Revolutionary Era ===
In summer 1774 delegates from Thirteen Colonies were called to convene in Philadelphia. The need to elect representatives for the Province of North Carolina at the First Continental Congress in Philadelphia prompted a mass meeting in July, 1774 in Wilmington, North Carolina. North Carolinians set the date for the First Provincial Congress of North Carolina for August 20 at Johnston County courthouse, later changing the date and place to August 25, 1774, in New Bern, North Carolina. Rowan county residents were the very first in North Carolina to respond to the recent chain of events. On August 8, 1774 freeholders representing all parts of Rowan County met in Salisbury and unanimously adopted Resolutions by inhabitants of Rowan County concerning resistance to Parliamentary taxation and the Provincial Congress of North Carolina, also colloquially known as Rowan Resolves. While professing obedience and fidelity to the Crown of Great Britain, Rowan Resolves resisted taxation without representation, proclaiming it "subversive to the liberties of the colonies" and reducing the colonies to the state of slavery; asserted the cause of Sister Colony of the Massachusetts Bay and the Town of Boston as the common cause of all American colonies; decried cruelty and corruption of the Intolerable Acts; called to unity among all the colonies in their resistance to the infringement upon their rights and privileges; called for boycott of British goods; and decried African slave trade as injurious to the colonies among other resolutions. Among freeholders who signed Rowan Resolves were George Cathy and Samuel Young, both of whom owned land in the general vicinity of present-day Mount Ulla. Samuel Young and Moses Winslow were elected to represent Rowan County at the First Provincial Congress of North Carolina in New Bern.

The history of slavery in this part of the county is not well researched. There were fewer black residents in Western part of North Carolina than the east, but both slave and free black appear in the records from the 1750s. Abel Cowan of Wood Grove Plantation near Bear Poplar owned 36 slaves in 1840. There were records that one of the founding fathers of Back Creek Presbyterian Church, John Barr, owned two slaves on his plantation.

Throughout the summer of 1868 conservative political clubs started to spring up in Western Rowan and in Mount Ulla in particular to combat Radical Republicans of the Reconstruction Era.

== Demographics ==
Historical population
Year	Pop.	±%
1870	1,720	—
1880	1,803	+4.8%
1890	1,389	−23.0%
1900	1,109	−20.2%
1910	1,237	+11.5%
1920	1,282	+3.6%
1930	1,389	+8.3%
1940	1,381	−0.6%
1950	1,112	−19.5%
1960	1,164	+4.7%
1970	1,214	+4.3%
1980	1,038	−14.5%
1990	1,116	+7.5%
2000	1,397	+25.2%
2010 (est.)	2,525	+80.7%
Source: "Decennial Census of Population and Housing". United States Census Bureau.

=== Population ===
According to 2010 US Census Bureau Profile of General Population and Housing Characteristics, there were 2,525 people residing in 28125 zip code area. Twenty-five and a half percent of residents are ages 0–19. Citizens over 65 years of age comprise 14.9 percent of the population. The median age of a Mount Ulla community resident was around 42 years. Male population was 51% vs 49% female. Close to 63% of households are husband and wife families.

White residents make up almost 96% of the population, Black - around 2%, Hispanic/Latino - almost 2%.

Eighty percent of residents have at least completed high school. Fifteen percent of residents have received bachelor's degree or higher.

=== Language ===
Mount Ulla residents speak rural Piedmont North Carolina dialect of Southern American English. The Scots-Irish that settled the area in the middle of the 18th century influenced the local dialect. Settlement pattern in this part of Piedmont, isolated farmsteads rather than towns, explains microdialect differences that can be heard among many descendants of the Scots-Irish today. Evidence of Scots-Irish origin of the dialect can be seen in an iconic grammatical language form of the a-prefix with words ending in -ing ("he is a-hunting') where a- is pronounced as "uh"; lexicological form "over yonder". One feature of local dialect in pronunciation is a change of the unstressed final o sounds as in words ending in -o and -ow to -er that results in fellow becoming feller. Further reduction of words can be seen as well in potato sounding like (po)tater or mosquito like skeeter.

=== Religion ===
Mount Ulla residents are predominantly Protestant Christians. The following churches have served the community:

- Back Creek Presbyterian Church (PCA), founded in 1805
- Cleveland United Methodist Church, established in 1902; closed 2019
- Centenary Global Methodist Church, established in 1884
- Ebenezer Church of Mt. Ulla (formerly Ebenezer United Methodist Church), established in 1853
- Knox Chapel United Methodist Church, organized around 1879; closed 2019
- Mount Tabor Presbyterian Church, founded in 1867
- Mount Zion Missionary Baptist Church, Boyden Quarters, established in 1853
- Oakland Presbyterian Church, founded in 1867; closed 1968
- Sills Creek AME Zion Church, founded in 1879
- Shady Grove Baptist Church, established 1879
- Smith Chapel Apostolic Holiness Church
- St. Luke's Evangelical Lutheran Church, founded in 1869
- Thyatira Presbyterian Church, established before 1750

== Governance ==
Mount Ulla is governed at the county level and does not have any local government.

=== Elections ===
Mount Ulla Township is designated Mt. Ulla voting precinct 24 with a polling place at Mt. Ulla Station of West Rowan Fire Department; North Carolina Congressional district 13; North Carolina Senate district 34; North Carolina House of Representatives district 77.

==== 2018 government representation ====
As of February 9, 2019, the following legislators represent the residents of Mount Ulla in the United States and the state of North Carolina governments.

- North Carolina Congressional district 13 representative: Ted Budd (R)
- North Carolina Senate district 34 representative: Vickie Sawyer (R)
- North Carolina House district 77 representative: Julia C. Howard (R)

See also: North Carolina Senators: Richard Burr (R) since 2005, class 3 (next election in 2022) and Thom Tillis (R) since 2015, class 2 (next election in 2020).

=== Schools ===
Mount Ulla has been served since consolidation of schools in the 1960s by Mount Ulla Elementary, West Rowan Middle, and West Rowan High School. All of the schools are under Rowan-Salisbury School System jurisdiction. Mount Ulla Elementary and West Rowan High School have Mount Ulla address and are located within community boundaries. West Rowan Middle School has a Salisbury address and is not part of the community.

Historical schools depicted in the 1903 map of Mount Ulla Township include: Pine Grove School, Knox School on the border with Cleveland Township, Maranda School in the southern border of the township, a high school near the train depot, and a school south of the railroad in eastern Mount Ulla Township.

==== History ====
During the early days of immigration into Rowan both German and Scotch-Irish settlers were zealous for education and religion. In their communities the school house and the church were usually one and the same structure. Thus prior to 1850 much of the educational upbringing of children was handled by religious institutions. Rev.Andrew Lockridge, the pastor of Back Creek Presbyterian Church, in addition to his ministerial work taught a classical school in the community. During this time he convinced members of the community of the need to have a denominational home college. Back Creek Church members subscribed and paid for the founding and support of Davidson College during 1835–1839. Public schools began to appear in early the 1850s after the county legislature passed the law on public education in 1843. Private schools continued operations because public schools were poorly financed and operated only four or five months a year. Back Creek Academy at Mount Ulla was in operation as early as 1868.

German Lutherans started one of the first area subscription schools in 1872 soon as the congregation of St.Luke's Lutheran Church formed in 1869. A parochial school was built in 1880 and St. Luke's provided a school for the community until 1897 when it closed due to public schools moving into the area.

Between the years of 1881 and 1924 the public county schools in the area were the worst in the state. Many schools had only two rooms, often not fit for school use. Mount Ulla had a public school in 1918. In 1924 John H.Cook of the Greensboro Woman's College recommended improvements in public school buildings, increasing their size to not less than eight rooms. Mount Ulla was on the list of communities to improve its public school. Mount Ulla Elementary School was accredited in 1937. Mount Ulla High School was accredited in 1927. A segrated unaccredited Negro school operated at Bear Poplar. Public schools integrated in 1961 and by the mid-1960s Bear Poplar school for Blacks stopped its operation.

=== Fire departments ===
As the roads in the rural farmland of Mount Ulla improved and the density of population grew, the need for organized fire protection arose. In 1953 Mount Ulla and Bear Poplar saw the opening of their first volunteer fire department. In 1956 Centenary Volunteer Fire Department (VFD) opened to serve the community. In 2001 Mount Ulla-Bear Poplar Volunteer Fire Department merged with Centenary VFD to form class 5 West Rowan Volunteer Fire Department. It consists of four fire stations - Centenary, Bear Poplar, Mount Ulla, and Miranda - covering the area of 49 square miles of rural homes and farmland with approximately 3,000 people living in the district.

West Rowan Fire Department is a volunteer non-profit entity governed by the board of directors. Like all Rowan fire department, it is funded through fire taxes. In the last decades the number of calls steadily increased, requiring more volunteers, effort, time, and money to keep volunteer departments in operation.

In the late 1980s Rowan Emergency Medical Services (EMS) started Medical Responder Program that trains and certifies firefighter teams to respond to medical emergencies when EMS is called. At present as of 2018 over fifty percent of calls for West Rowan VFD are medical emergencies. Medical emergencies account for the rise in overall response rates.

== Transportation ==
- NC 150
- NC 801

Miller Air Park, a private airport

In 1898 the North Carolina Midland Railroad extended Winston-Salem-Mocksville branch to Mooresville, where it connected to the Atlantic, Tennessee and Ohio Railroad. Mooresville junction created a through route directly connecting Winston-Salem with Charlotte. The railroad branch operated as a secondary main line. Scheduled manifest trains transported three primary products---furniture, textile, and tobacco products. Passenger trains, Carolina and Asheville Special, operated between the two endpoints of Winston-Salem and Charlotte which also provided connections to points beyond until the 1960s when automobile and airplane travel made passenger trains obsolete. Mount Ulla was a scheduled stop for passenger trains, while Bear Poplar and Mazeppa were flag stops. Steele Feed & Seed (Bear Poplar) and Mount Ulla Flour Mill were commercial shippers along the rail line. In 1915 Southern Railway leased the railroad branch. Today Norfolk Southern operates the Norfolk Southern "L" Line through Mount Ulla.

== Economy ==
Historically Mount Ulla has been a farming community and remains such today. Some of the notable farms and farm stores in the area are

- Back Creek Farm
- Bear Poplar Farm, growing food as well as serving as solar energy farm.
- Brown Farm, established in 1835
- Evans Family Farm
- Gander Hill Farm
- Grampian Farm
- Green Hills Gelbvieh
- Hodge Farm
- Hoffner Brothers Dairy
- Keeper Creek Farm
- Kerr Mill Holsteins
- Mary L Farm
- McLaughlin Farmhouse
- Moore Farm
- New Moon Natural Heritage Farm
- Owen Plantation
- Patterson Farm Market & Tours
- Rocking J Ranch
- Tailwind Farm
- Walnut Hollow Farms
- Webster Family Farm, flower farm and llama retirement farm protected by The LandTrust for Central North Carolina.
- West Rowan Farm, Home & Garden (formerly Steele Feed & Seed; now known as Elsie's)

Plans are underway to build a solar farm in Mount Ulla.

== Culture ==
=== Architecture and historic communities ===
==== Historic communities ====
Modern-day Mount Ulla encompasses many smaller historic communities within its boundaries. Their number is indicative of smaller scale local communities that evolved in rural Rowan County when transportation was not readily available. The communities that completely or partially fall into the boundaries of Mount Ulla are:

- Bear Poplar
- Centenary
- Mazeppa
- Millbridge
- Miranda
- Mount Ulla

The Mill Bridge Scenic Byway designated by N.C.Department of Transportation goes through a significant part of Mount Ulla.

Lazy 5 Ranch, a drive through zoo of domestic and exotic animals, is located in Mount Ulla. It has been in operation since 1993 and is a home for 750 animals from six continents.

==== Historic architecture ====
Mount Ulla has a significant number of structures that are listed on the National Register of Historic Places:

- Back Creek Presbyterian Church and Cemetery;
- Hall Family House
- John Carlyle and Anita Sherrill House
- Kerr Mill
- Knox Chapel Methodist Church
- Rankin-Sherrill House
- Wood Grove, a historic plantation and ancestral seat of Cowan and Krider families

Other historic properties include

- Back Creek Church Manse (Watts-Sloop House)
- Dr. George Alexander Brown House, built in 1912 by a local physician (1869–1938), who maintained an office with an operating room and a drug store behind the residence
- Dr. Oni Pinkney Houston House, remains of the house built in the late 1860s on a tract of Barr family plantation, now Mary L Farm
- Dr. Samuel Kerr House (Oakland)
- George Henry Brown (1837–1931) House, built in the 1860s and remains the seat of the Brown family
- Hart's Post Office and Hart House, built in the 1880s
- Hart-Coble House, built in 1900
- Lockridge-Goodman House, built in the 1830s by Rev.Andrew Y. Lockridge who is credited for naming Mount Ulla
- St. Luke's Lutheran Church

=== Conservation ===
Citizens of Mount Ulla have been involved in preserving the historic and agricultural legacy of the community. Hoffner Brothers Dairy Farm, Webster family farms, and Historic Cowan-Wagoner farm that is the site of Wood Grove are under the protection of the Three Rivers Land Trust, formerly known as LandTrust for Central North Carolina.

==== Tower controversy, 2005–2014 ====
In 2005, Davidson County Broadcasting applied to place a radio tower in Mount Ulla. In response to this, citizens of Mount Ulla formed Mount Ulla Historic Preservation Society (MUHPS) in 2006 to protect rural landscape and farming legacy of the community. The Miller Air Park Association and MUHPS prevented the placement of a radio station tower on the grounds that it would be hazardous to local airplane traffic and mar the rural landscape of the community. This has become known as the tower controversy and lasted from 2005 till 2014.

==== Dollar General opposition ====
In March 2019, the citizens of Mount Ulla became aware that Dollar General wanted to place a store in the middle of the community at the intersection of NC 801 and Back Creek Church Road. This would require rezoning the land from rural agricultural to commercial, business, industrial in a community that is zoned over 99% rural agricultural. On Wednesday, April 10, 2019, Teramore Development, the company planning to build a Dollar General store, held a meeting at the West Rowan Volunteer Fire Department to answer questions. Approximately 150 citizens came to voice their strong unanimous opposition to Dollar General presence in the community. Almost a month later, on May 5, 2019, the Mount Ulla Historic Preservation Society received a legal document with information that the contract between Teramore Development and the landowner for the proposed Dollar General site was terminated. The landowner said that one of the reasons for voiding the contract was how friendly and courteous the people of Mount Ulla were to him despite the circumstances.

=== Civic clubs and organizations ===
- John Knox Chapter, Daughters of the American Revolution
- Millbridge Ruritan Club
- Mount Ulla Historic Preservation Society
- Mount Ulla Lions Club
- Rowan Helping Ministries - West
- West Rowan Future Farmers of America

=== Art ===
==== Barn Quilt Trail ====
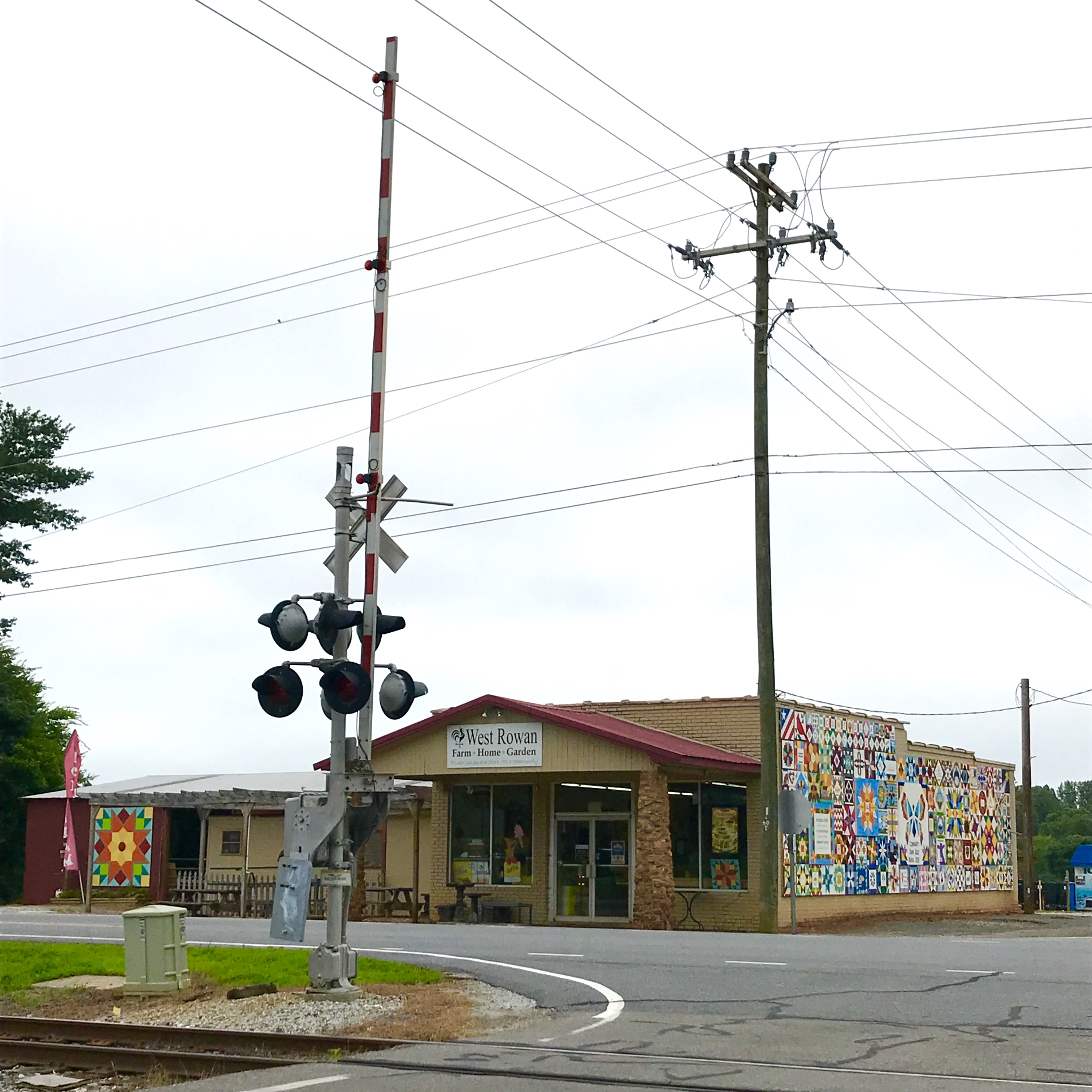
Mount Ulla Barn Quilt, the largest community barn quilt in the United States from 2019 to 2021

In 2014–15, Adele Goodman of the Mount Ulla Historic Preservation Society started development of the Barn Quilt Trail in Mount Ulla and surrounding areas. Barn quilt artists who create in the area are Elsie Bennett, Pam Bostian, and Susan Bostian. Elsie Bennett's barn quilt, "Roselind's Flower" in memory of Ms. Ronney Steele was a finalist in Our State Magazine in 2018. Currently she is working on "Biggest Community Barn Quilt in North Carolina". The Mount Ulla Historic Preservation Society co-published a 2019 calendar "Barn Quilts of Rowan".

On July 8, 2019, residents of Mount Ulla installed what was then the largest community barn quilt in the United States on the wall of a Bear Poplar store, Elsie's (formerly known as West Rowan Farm, Home & Garden). The Mount Ulla Community Barn Quilt is 500 square feet, twenty square feet larger than the previous title holder - a community barn quilt in Ashland, Kansas.

In November 2019 Elsie Bennett and Adele Goodman published book Community Barn Quilt Mural of Bear Polar: Our Stories where they recorded the personal stories behind the squares making up Bear Poplar's Community Barn Quilt Mural.

The Bear Poplar Community Barn Quilt Mural held the title of largest barn quilt mural in the United States from 2019 until 23 October 2021 when it was surpassed by the "Always Original Barn Quilt Mural" in the nearby town of Cleveland, North Carolina.

==== Popular culture ====
Mount Ulla was a filming location for Banshee, an American action television series set in the small town of Banshee in Pennsylvania's Amish country.

=== Notable people ===
The following list includes notable people who were born or have lived in the vicinity of Mount Ulla, North Carolina.

- Thomas Cowan, a Revolutionary War Captain
- Thomas Gillespie, American Revolution Commissary, Thyatira elder, and Great-Grandfather of James K. Polk
- Samuel Eusebius McCorkle, a pioneer Presbyterian preacher, the first permanent minister at historic Thyatira Presbyterian Church, a teacher and a leader in establishment and promotion of public education in North Carolina, the inceptor of a public university and a founding father of the University of North Carolina at Chapel Hill.

== Adjacent townships ==
- Atwell – south
- Barringer Township, Iredell County – southwest
- Chambersburg Township, Iredell County – northwest
- Cleveland – north
- Steele – east
