= Elizabeth Maxwell Steele =

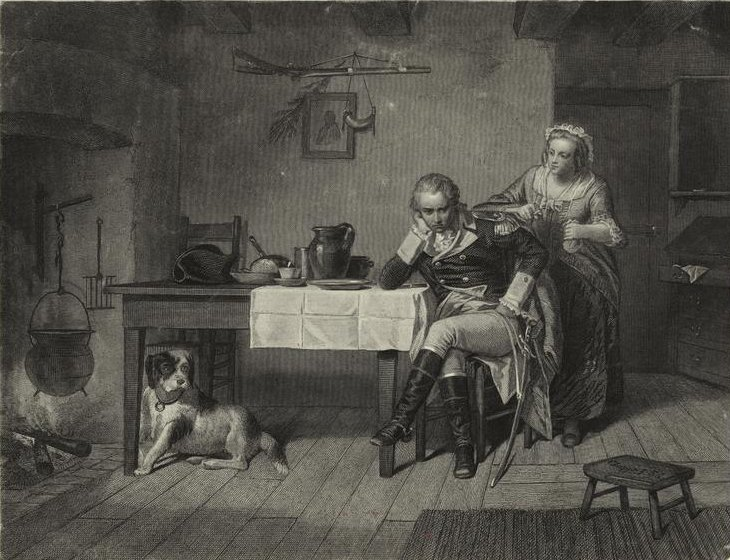
- Born: Elizabeth Maxwell; 1733; Pennsylvania Province
- Died: November 22, 1790 (aged 56–57); Salisbury, Rowan County, North Carolina, United States
- Other name: Elizabeth Maxwell Gillespie
- Children: 3, including John Steele

Elizabeth Gillespie Steele, commonly known as Elizabeth Maxwell Steele (née Maxwell; 1733–1790), was an active supporter of the American Revolution. She helped run a prominent tavern in Salisbury, North Carolina, that served as a "resort" for many notable figures of the time. Her involvement with the tavern allowed her to support the Revolution by offering hospitality and charity to other supporters of the American cause.

== Early life and family ==
Elizabeth Maxwell was born in 1733 in Pennsylvania to a Scottish family, who had previously immigrated to Pennsylvania Province. While she was a child the family moved and settled in Rowan County, Province of North Carolina. She had a sibling named James. He practiced medicine in Pennsylvania, after having completed his education in Scotland.

== Marriages and children ==
Steele first married Robert Gillespie, who owned and operated a tavern in Salisbury. They had two children, Robert Jr. and Margaret Gillespie, who married Rev. Dr. Samuel Eusebius McCorkle, who was a Presbyterian preacher and teacher. Robert Gillespie Sr. was shot 7 times and scalped on March 21, 1760, by Cherokee warriors while returning to Salisbury from Fort Dobbs. Steele continued to operate the tavern after her husband's death.

After Robert Gillespie's death, Steele married her second husband William Steele (a merchant, innkeeper and local real estate speculator), who was from Pennsylvania. They had one son together, John Steele. William Steele died before the Revolutionary War, which left Elizabeth Steele to raise three children and run an ordinary tavern in Salisbury single-handedly. She also became involved in real estate speculation and was able to procure a small estate for herself.

John Steele, Elizabeth Steele's only child by her second husband, went on to become appointed comptroller of the U.S. Treasury by President Washington. He also played a major role in defending the militia concept and criticizing a standing army accompanied by excessive executive authority. There is also a book written about him called the Papers of John Steele.

== Participation in the American Revolutionary War ==
Elizabeth Steele, who was a Whig Patriot, is most renowned for aiding General Nathanael Greene on the morning of February 1, 1781, from her tavern in Salisbury in Rowan County, North Carolina.

The encounter occurred at breakfast when a rather weary and disheartened General Greene entered the tavern. He had been riding all night and had just learned of the death of General William Davidson at the hands of the British Lieutenant, Colonel Banastre of the Tarleton's Dragoons. Davidson was killed defending Cowan's Ford on the Catawba River, near present-day Davidson College, that also claimed the lives of 15–50 of his men in the Salisbury District Brigade. This was a blow to the war effort and put Greene in a difficult tactical position as he had been waiting the entire night for those men to launch a counter-attack on the British.

It quickly became clear to Steele that Greene needed aid. She gave him breakfast to help bolster his spirits. Once she learned of the general's current situation, she went into the back room of her tavern and, upon her return, drew from under her apron two small bags full of specie, probably the earnings of a number of years, and gave them to General Greene. Reportedly saying, "Take these, General. You need them and I can do without them." General Greene gratefully accepted.

After Greene's encounter with Steele, his circumstances improved greatly. While still in Salisbury, he garnered Mrs. Steele's aid, and he discovered a collection of more than 1,700 Continental arms that were stashed away for the militia. They were then put to use in resupplying the war effort against the British.

Steele helped improve Greene's spirits and morale, which helped him be successful on the battlefield in the coming days and months, notably at the Battle of Guilford Courthouse in mid-March 1781. General Greene's biographer noted of his encounter with Steele: "Never, did relief come at a more propitious moment; nor would it be straining conjecture to suppose that he resumed his journey with his spirits cheered and lightened by this touching proof of woman's devotion to the cause of her country."

== Death and legacy ==
Elizabeth Maxwell Steele died on November 22, 1790. The Salisbury Chapter of the Daughters of the American Revolution (DAR) was named in her honor. They had a plaque affixed to the front façade of the 1850 Courthouse in Steele's memory and in recognition of the 130th anniversary of her meeting with General Greene. They also erected a new headstone for Steele in 1948 at the Thyatira Presbyterian Church. The "Immortal Patriotism" stone stands near the graves of her two husbands, William Steele and Robert Gillespie.

== Sources ==
- Waldrup, Carole Chandler (2004). More Colonial women : 25 pioneers of early America. Jefferson, N.C. : McFarland & Co. ISBN 978-0-7864-1839-8.
