= Rankin–Sherrill House =

Historic house in North Carolina, United States

- U.S. National Register of Historic Places
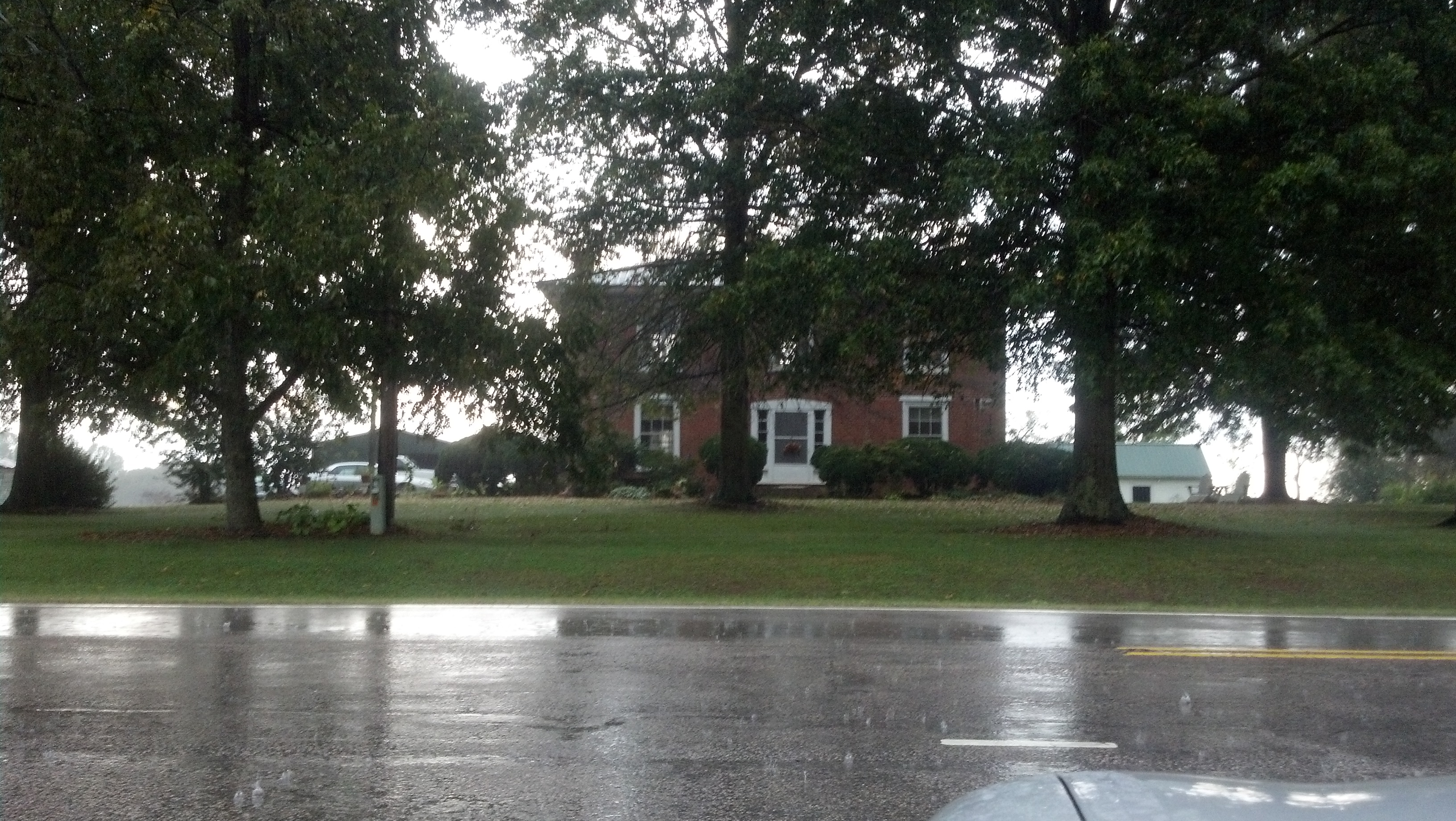
- Rankin–Sherrill House, September 2012

- Location within North Carolina Location within the United States
- Location: 14125 NC 801 Hwy, Mount Ulla, North Carolina
- Coordinates: 35°39′27″N 80°43′41″W
- Area: 7.3 acres (3.0 ha)
- Built: c. 1855
- Architectural style: Greek Revival
- NRHP reference No.: 82003508
- Added to NRHP: September 23, 1982

The Rankin–Sherrill House is a historic home located at Mount Ulla, Rowan County, North Carolina. It was built about 1855, and is a two-story, three-bay, "L"-plan brick dwelling with Greek Revival-style design elements. It has a low hipped roof, and the front facade has a simple hipped roof Colonial Revival porch. Also on the property is a contributing Smokehouse/Oairy/Well House built about 1853.

It was listed on the National Register of Historic Places in 1982.
