= Back Creek Presbyterian Church and Cemetery =

Historic site in Rowan County, North Carolina, US

- Back Creek Presbyterian Church and Cemeterey
- U.S. National Register of Historic Places
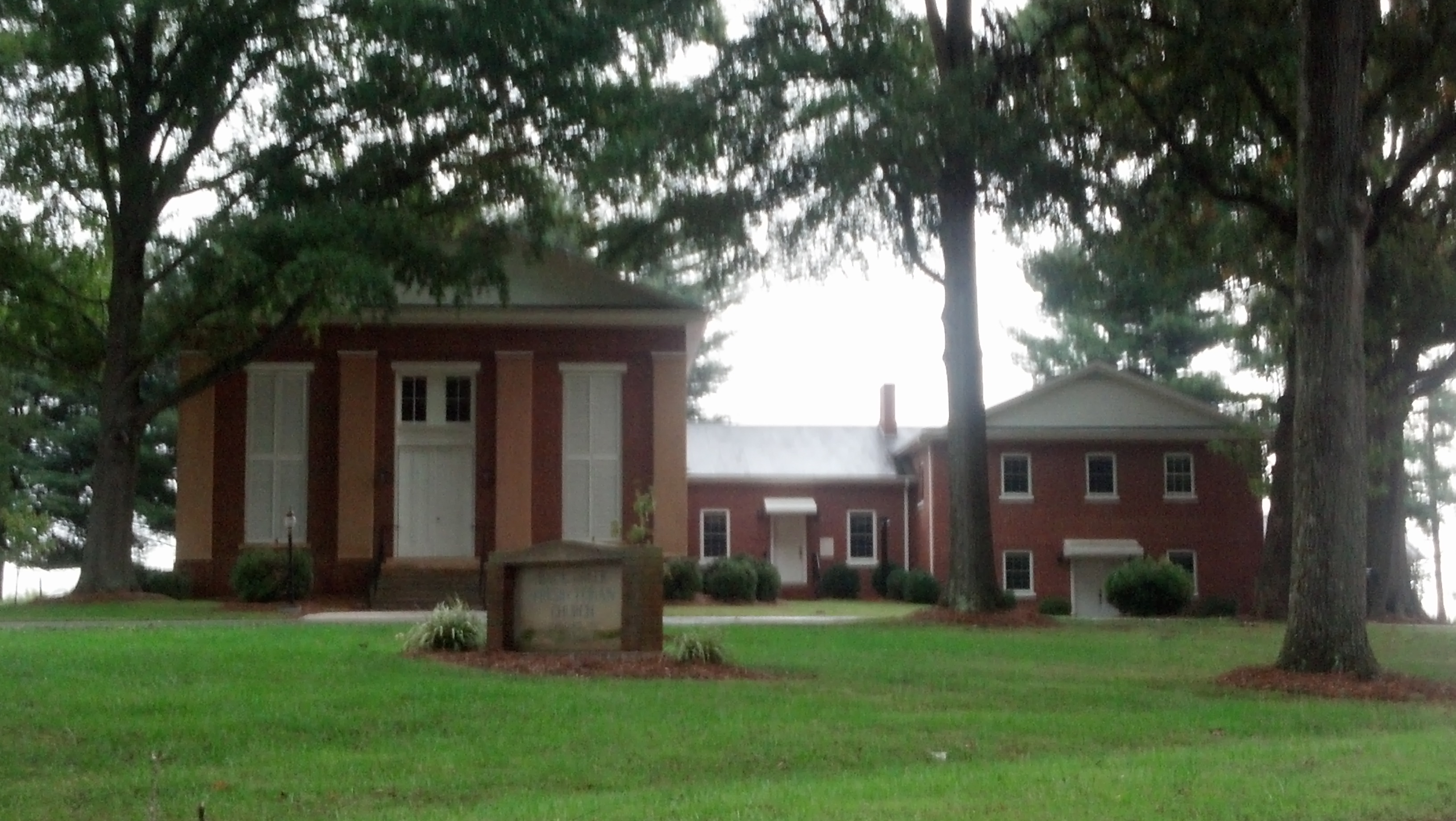
- Back Creek Presbyterian Church, September 2012

- Location within North Carolina Location within the United States
- Location: 2145 Back Creek Church Road (SR 1763), Mount Ulla, North Carolina
- Coordinates: 35°39′3″N 80°42′24″W
- Area: 5.8 acres (2.3 ha)
- Built: 1857
- Architectural style: Greek Revival
- NRHP reference No.: 83003998
- Added to NRHP: December 29, 1983

Back Creek Presbyterian Church and Cemetery is a historic Presbyterian church and cemetery in Mount Ulla, Rowan County, North Carolina currently affiliated with the Presbyterian Church in America (PCA). It was named for a nearby stream, which was back of Sills Creek and called Back Creek.

== History ==
In the late 18th century disagreements about the worship style at Thyatira Presbyterian Church culminated in the splitting of its congregation. Thirty families, including five of Thyatira's elders—Thomas King, John Barr, William Bell, Abraham Lowrance, and Thomas Gillespie, Jr. (son of Thomas Gillespie, Sr.)—left the church. The only elder still loyal to Thyatira was Capt. Thomas Cowan (1747-1817). They worshipped without a pastor from September 1805 until April 1807. The official date of establishment of Back Creek was September 5, 1805.

In 1807 the first pastor, Rev. Joseph D. Kilpatrick of Poplar Tent Presbytery, accepted the call to lead the new congregation. Four years later, in 1811, land was deeded by one of the ruling elders, John Barr, to "Back Creek Meeting House" and the congregation built a little log house of worship on the land. This was replaced by the congregation's present Greek Revival sanctuary built in 1857. In 1869 the congregation lost their African-American members, nearly half of the congregation. The entire region suffered economic depression. Many members left to the West. In 1952 a religious educational building was added. The current manse was built in 1968. Over the years Back Creek Presbyterian belonged to five different Presbyterian denomination. In 1991 the congregation joined the Presbyterian Church of America. And in 1993 the classrooms and kitchen were expanded.

In 1824 some members of Back Creek Church congregation organized Prospect Presbyterian Church in southwestern corner of Rowan County.

The Rev. S. C. Alexander (1830–1907) delivered the dedication of the third church building in an address at Thyatira on March 21, 1857. At that time, he was pastor of both Back Creek and Thyatira.

It was added to the National Register of Historic Places in 1983.

Back Creek adheres to the Westminster Confession of Faith, Westminster Larger Catechism and Westminster Shorter Catechism.

== See also ==
- South Yadkin River showing Back Creek
