= John Carlyle and Anita Sherrill House =

Historic house in North Carolina, United States

- U.S. National Register of Historic Places
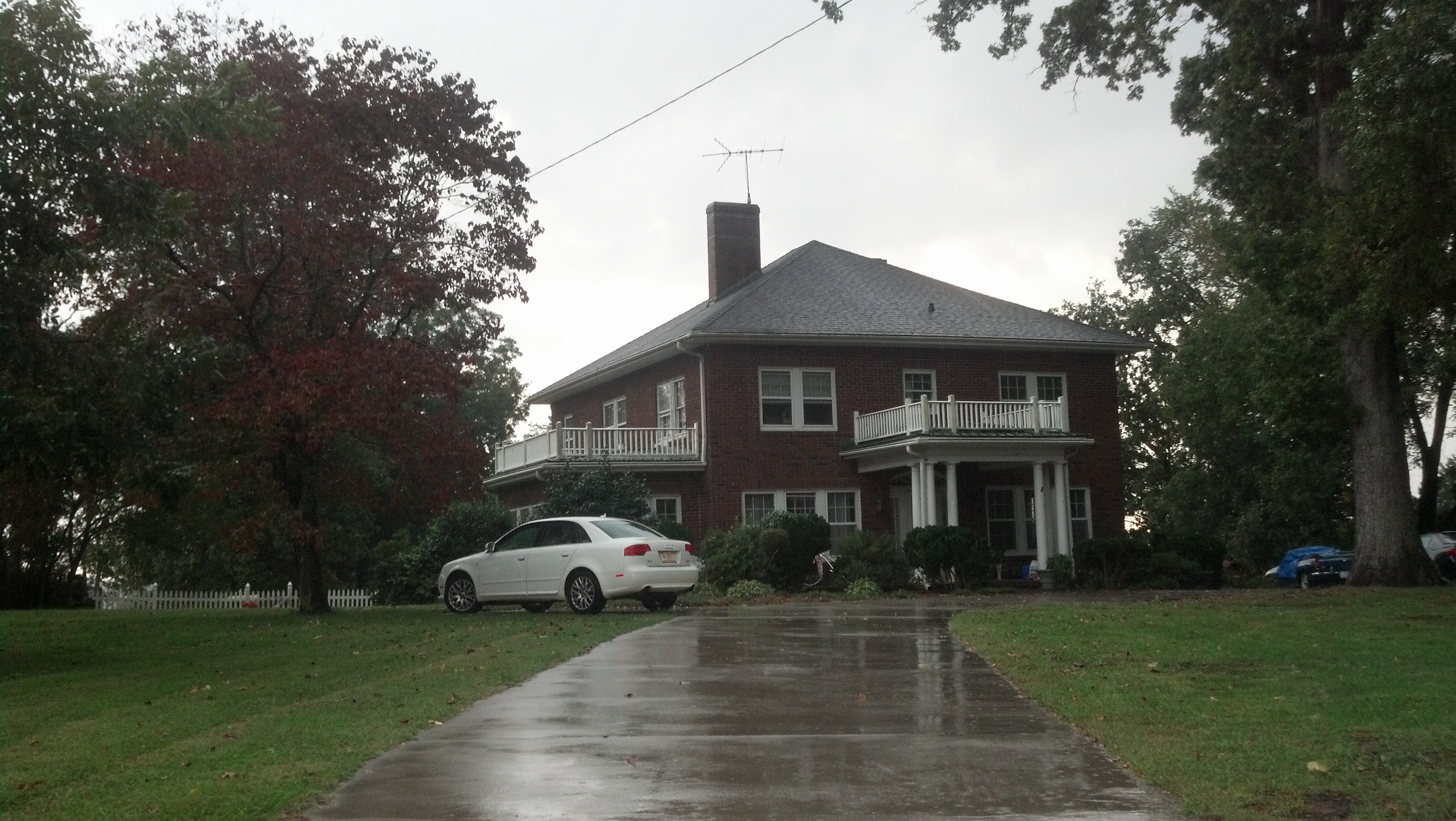
- John Carlyle and Anita Sherrill House, September 2012

- Location within North Carolina Location within the United States
- Location: 14175 NC 801, Mount Ulla, North Carolina
- Coordinates: 35°39′27″N 80°43′40″W
- Area: 1.8 acres (0.73 ha)
- Built: 1937-1938
- Built by: Brown, Charles Henry
- Architectural style: Colonial Revival
- NRHP reference No.: 09000704
- Added to NRHP: September 1, 2009

John Carlyle and Anita Sherrill House is a historic home located at Mount Ulla, Rowan County, North Carolina. It was built in 1937–1938, and is a two-story, Colonial Revival-style brick dwelling. It has a tall hipped roof and a classical one-story entrance porch supported by Tuscan order columns. Also on the property is a contributing garage built about 1920.

It was listed on the National Register of Historic Places in 2009.
