= John Steele (North Carolina politician) =

American politician (1764–1815)

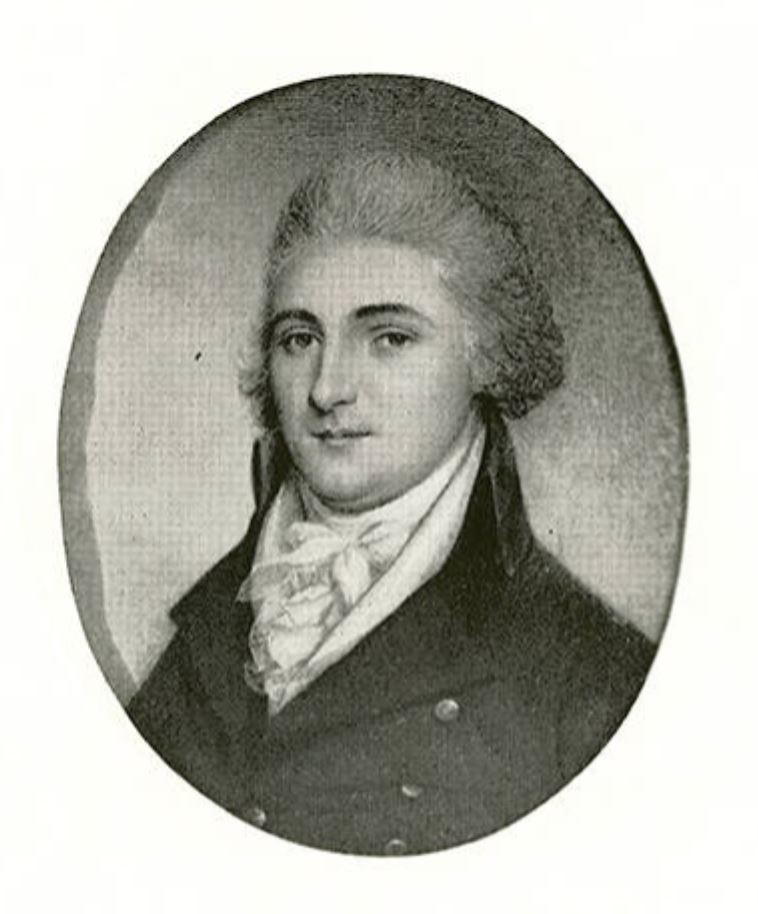
- 1797 portrait

Member of the U.S. House of Representatives from North Carolina
- In office April 19, 1790 – March 3, 1793
- Preceded by: District established
- Succeeded by: Joseph McDowell
- Constituency: 4th district (1790–1791); 1st district (1791–1793)

Personal details
- Born: November 16, 1764 Salisbury, North Carolina, U.S.
- Died: August 14, 1815 (aged 50) Salisbury, North Carolina, U.S.
- Party: Federalist
- Parent: Elizabeth Maxwell Steele (mother)

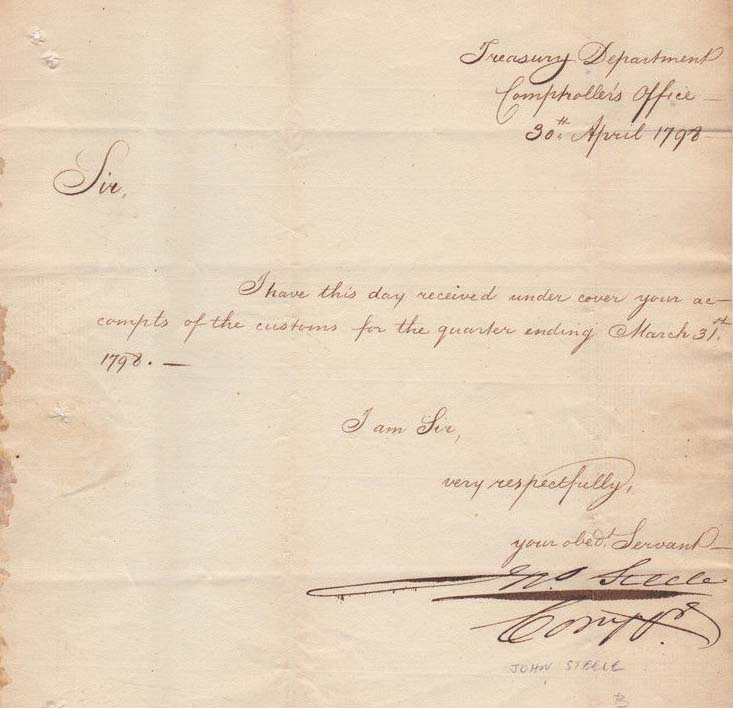
Steele's signature on a letter dated April 30, 1798. He signs as the Comptroller of the United States Treasury. From the collection of H. Blair Howell.

John Steele (November 16, 1764 – August 14, 1815) was a planter, Federalist legislator, comptroller of the U.S. Treasury, and member of the United States House of Representatives from the state of North Carolina between 1790 and 1793.

== Life and career ==
Born in North Carolina in 1764, the son of Elizabeth Maxwell Gillespie and William Steele, John Steele attended Clio's Nursery and the English School, both near Salisbury, his hometown. Named assessor in 1784 and a town commissioner in 1787, Steele was first elected to the North Carolina House of Commons from the Salisbury District in 1787 and served again multiple times: in 1788, 1794, 1795, 1806, and from 1811 to 1813. He was Speaker of the House in 1811. He was a delegate to the U.S. Constitutional convention in Hillsborough in 1788 and to the 1789 convention in Fayetteville which ratified the U.S. Constitution, and was a special commissioner from North Carolina to treat with the Cherokee and Chickasaw Indians from 1788 to 1790.

From April 19, 1790, until March 3, 1793, Steele was a member of the United States House of Representatives. A Federalist, he was considered Pro-Administration. He opposed assumption of the state debt by the Federal government and the excise tax on whiskey. He was also a U.S. Senate candidate in 1792.

On July 1, 1796, Steele was appointed Comptroller of the Treasury by President George Washington; he was reappointed by Presidents Adams and Jefferson until his resignation on December 15, 1802. In 1805, Steele was appointed to the board of commissioners tasked with determining the dividing lines between North Carolina, South Carolina, and Georgia, where he served until 1814.

=== Death ===
Steele died on August 14, 1815, in his hometown of Salisbury; that same day, he had been elected again to the North Carolina House of Commons. He is buried in Salisbury's Chestnut Hill Cemetery.

=== Legacy ===
The John Steele House was listed on the National Register of Historic Places in 1994.

U.S. House of Representatives
Preceded by District created	Member of the U.S. House of Representatives from North Carolina's 4th congressional district 1790–1791	Succeeded by Hugh Williamson
Preceded by John B. Ashe	Member of the U.S. House of Representatives from North Carolina's 1st congressional district 1791–1793	Succeeded by Joseph McDowell
