= Samuel Eusebius McCorkle =

American Presbyterian preacher and education advocate (b. 1746, d. 1811)

Reverend Doctor Samuel Eusebius McCorkle

Personal life
- Born: 23 August 1746 Lancaster County, Pennsylvania
- Died: 21 January 1811 (aged 64) Mill Bridge, Rowan County, North Carolina
- Resting place: Thyatira Church Cemetery, Salisbury, Rowan County, North Carolina
- Spouse: Margaret Gillespie McCorkle
- Parents: Alexander McCorkle (father); Agness "Nancy" McCorkle (mother)
- Education: College of New Jersey, present day Princeton University
- Known for: private and public education advocate in North Carolina, USA

Religious life
- Religion: Christianity
- Denomination: Presbyterianism
- Church: Thyatira Presbyterian Church
- Profession: preacher, teacher

Samuel Eusebius McCorkle (August 23, 1746 – January 21, 1811) was a pioneer Presbyterian preacher, teacher, advocate for public and private education in North Carolina, and the interceptor and progenitor of the University of North Carolina at Chapel Hill, who first promoted the idea of establishing a university in the state.

== Biography ==
=== Early life ===
Samuel Eusebius McCorkle was born on August 23, 1746, the eldest child of ten in the family of Alexander McCorkle and Agness "Nancy" Montgomery McCorkle near Harris's Ferry (present day Harrisburg) in Lancaster County in the Province of Pennsylvania. Both of his parents, from families of Scottish Presbyterian descent, were born in Ulster. They were brought to America during the wave of Scotch-Irish migration in the early 18th century. Samuel's parents took great care in naming him: Samuel for a prophet of God and Eusebius for an early Greek Church historian. At the age of four Samuel was put into an English public school where he learned how to read, write, cipher, and recite Bible verses. This education, very typical of the times, could be summed up as "the five R's" - Reading, wRiting, aRithmetic, self-Restraint, and Religion. Samuel's schooling continued for five years, till he was nine.

In 1756 the McCorkles followed the Great Wagon Trail to North Carolina where they bought messuage tenement plantation. The tract of land lay on Back Creek, in the vicinity of present-day Mount Ulla near the border of Rowan and Iredell Counties west of Salisbury, North Carolina. There were no schools on the frontier, hence Samuel's schooling was briefly interrupted. During this time he became a very young teacher to his siblings - an experience that would chart the course for the rest of his life. On Sabbath the McCorkles would travel to Cathey's Meeting House (later renamed Thyatira Presbyterian Church), a substantial log church in the vicinity of Mill Bridge. Sermons were read by the elders of the church with an occasional visit from travelling ministers.

In 1760 Crowfield Academy opened in Rowan County (present day Iredell County). Samuel went to Crowfield for a year or two in 1764–65. Around 1766–67 Samuel became one of the first students in Dr. David Caldwell's Log College, a theological and classical school for young men. The period of study under Dr. Caldwell had a profound influence on Samuel McCorkle in both religious and scholarly ways.

=== College of New Jersey years ===
After completing the studies under Dr. Caldwell, Samuel McCorkle left Rowan County in 1768 to study for the ministry at the College of New Jersey (present day Princeton). The same year John Witherspoon, an influential figure in the development of the United States' national character and forging future religious and civic leaders, became the president of the College of New Jersey.

The influence of John Witherspoon upon the lifelong education of Samuel McCorkle was direct and pervasive. Many of the ideas which Witherspoon articulated in his writings and lectures later appeared in the sermons of Samuel McCorkle. The favorite words of Witherspoon — dignity, diligence, true religion, Zion, and piety — became an integral part of McCorkle's vocabulary.

McCorkle was admitted to membership in Cliosophic Society, a literary and debating club at the College of New Jersey, where he was known under the fictitious name "Virgil". Membership in the society made him a principle target in the "Paper War" of 1771–1772 — a literary battle of polemics in doggerel, hudibrastics, and prose — from the rival Whig Society members Hugh Henry Brackenridge, Philip Freneau, and James Madison. Frequent references to the humble origins of the Cliosophians — the manual labors, the poverty, the piety — indicate there may have been a social class distinction between the two societies.

In 1772, Samuel graduated from the College of New Jersey with a Bachelor of Arts degree.

=== Clerical apprenticeship ===
McCorkle was influenced by revival in the spring of 1772 at Princeton and McCorkle began to study for the ministry under his uncle, the Reverend Joseph Montgomery, his mother's brother.

=== Marriage and children ===
On July 2, 1776 Samuel McCorkle married Margaret Gillespie, the daughter of Robert and Elizabeth Gillespie (later Steele in second marriage), a prominent Salisbury, N.C. family. They had eight children, six of which lived into adulthood: one son, Alexander "Sandy", and five daughters, Nancy, Elizabeth, Sophia, Peggy, and Harriet. In 1786 their estate also included 7 enslaved Black people, 2 adults and 5 children.

=== University of North Carolina ===
Samuel McCorkle spearheaded the founding of a university in North Carolina. A university historian, Kemp Battle, acknowledged McCorkle as "one of the best friends the University had; [he] worked for it, begged for it; preached for it". After the first constitution of the state of North Carolina was adopted in 1776 after the United States declared its independence from the Kingdom of Great Britain, work began to establish the independent State of North Carolina. Article 41 of the North Carolina Constitution called for the establishment of affordable schools and universities for the instruction of the young people in the state. Samuel McCorkle made the first attempt to implement article 41. In November 1784 he introduced a bill in the North Carolina General Assembly to establish a state university. The bill was rejected due to financial restraints and political turmoil. In 1789 McCorkle became an original trustee of the institution, the only one who was a clergyman and who had taught. McCorkle procured $42 from the Thyatira congregation after appealing for subscriptions for the foundation of a university. It was the only congregational contribution made in the early history of the university.

McCorkle wrote the first university by-laws. They were sent to a committee, amended, and adopted in 1795. From 1795 till 1801 he was the Professor of Moral and Political Philosophy and History.

=== Zion-Parnassus Academy ===
In 1793 McCorkle announced a new academy that would prepare men for future university study. The school was to open within the Thyatira congregation and enroll ten students. In January 1794 the academy, named Zion-Parnassus, began operations. McCorkle chose the name to signify the importance of both Biblical (Zion) and classical (Parnassus) education. The academy was modeled on the school of Dr. David Caldwell where McCorkle received his classical education. The instruction was in basic languages and science, using such instruments as globes, a barometer, a thermometer, a microscope, prismatic glass, and surveying instruments. McCorkle was a pioneer in introducing such innovations as agriculture and science laboratories into a school curriculum.

In 1787 McCorkle requested and received a collection of books on teaching and pedagogy from Germany that allowed him to introduce teacher training at Thyatira Church. Zion-Parnassus was well known for its normal department, which was the first attempt at teacher training in North Carolina and one of the first in this country, and for its assistance with tuition and books to worthy students. The school maintained a high order of scholarship and had an extensive influence. Six of the seven members of the first graduating class of the University of North Carolina in 1798 received their college preparation in this academy. Forty-five of his students entered the ministry, others became lawyers, judges, and officers of the state.

== Philosophical and religious views ==
McCorkle was a moderate Calvinist, who valued both religious and classical education. During the course of his life he worked to bridge the Old Side–New Side Controversy within the Presbyterian Church in colonial America. Half of McCorkle's published sermons addressed the problems of church division and deism.

== Influence ==
John Brown was a pupil of McCorkle. He went on to become a professor at South Carolina College (later the university). He helped start Lancaster Academy (SC) in 1802, and Wadesboro Academy (NC) in 1803, and served as a trustee and president. Brown became President of the University of Georgia in Athens.

== Personal library ==
Samuel McCorkle possessed a large collection of books for back country frontier settlement, despite books being expensive and hard to procure at the time.

Some books in McCorkle's Library included:

- works on theology by authors such as Calvin, Turretin, Stackhouse, Stillingfleet and Owen;
- works on church history by authors such as Owen, Shuckford, Prideaux, and Mosheim (in Latin);
- works on law and civil government by authors such as Puffendorf, Burlemaqui, Montesquieu, and Blackstone
- F. G. Resewitz's Education for Citizenship
- J. C. F. Rist's Suggestions for School Teachers of the Lower Grades
- F. A. Wiedeburg's Fundamental Principles, Plan, Discipline, and Teaching Methods for the Ducal Institute of Pedagogy at Helmstaedt
- J. H. Campe's Elementary Psychology for Children
- G. F. Seller's Book of School Methods
- J. B. Basedow's Elementary Work
- Characterization of Educational Works in Germany
- The Magazine for Philology and Pedagogy for 1791, edited by Wiedeburg.

== Published works ==
- A Sermon for the Anniversary of American Independence, July 24, 1786
- A Sermon on the Law of God Delivered at Superior Court in Salisbury, September 20, 1789
- A Sermon: The Creation of Man; Prepared for Society at Hopewell, January 6, 1790
- A Sermon of Sacrifices (1792)
- A Charity Sermon (1793)
- A Sermon preached at the laying of the corner-stone of the University of North Carolina (1793)
- A National Thanksgiving Sermon, titled The comparative happiness and duty of the United States of America, contrasted with other nations, particularly the Israelites (1795)
- Four Discourses on the great first principles of Deism and Revelation, contrasted (1797)
- A Discourse, on Doctrine and Duty of Keeping the Sabbath (1798)
- A National Fast Sermon, titled The work of God for the French Republick, and then her reformation and ruin; or, the novel and useful experiment of national deism, to us and all future ages (1798)
- Three Discourses on the Terms of Christian Communion (1798)
- The Angel's seal, set upon God's faithful servants, when hurtful winds are blowing in the Church militant
- The crime and curse of plundering. A sermon
- A Sermon from Deuteronomy
- Creation
- A Sermon on the Death of General Washington

== Legacy ==
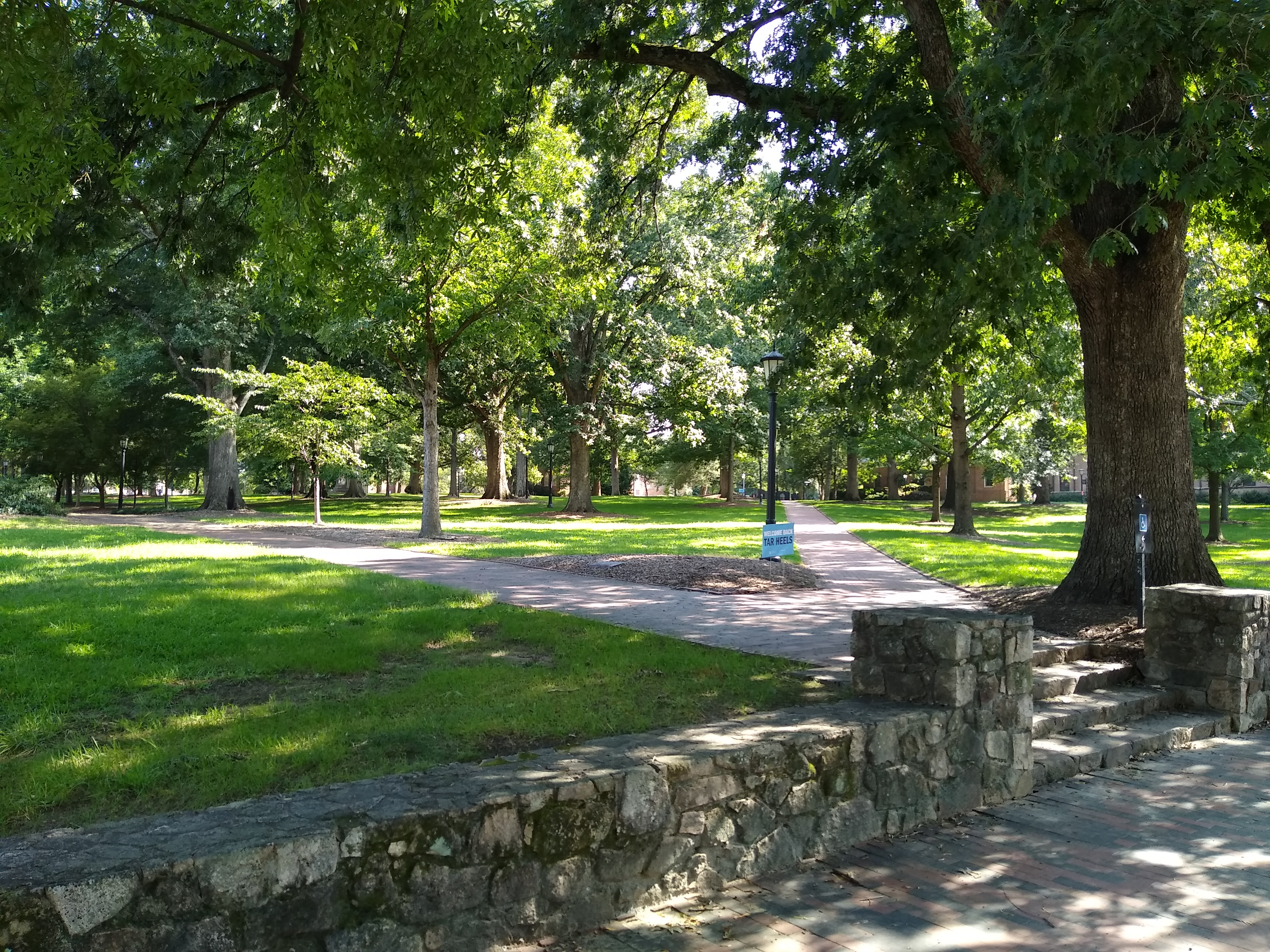
McCorkle Place on UNC campus is named after Samuel Eusebius McCorkle.

McCorkle Place, a green square on campus of the University of North Carolina at Chapel Hill, North Carolina, is named after Samuel Eusebius McCorkle in recognition of his efforts to establish the university. However, there are no interpretative markers to educate the public about McCorkle's contributions. McCorkle place is considered to be one of the most beautiful places in Chapel Hill, North Carolina. Two UNC landmarks are located at McCorkle Place — the iconic symbol of the university, a neoclassical rotunda, nicknamed the Old Well, and an over 300-year-old tulip poplar tree, Davie Poplar.

The North Carolina Historical Highway Marker Program marked a site in the vicinity of Zion-Parnassus Academy to commemorate Samuel E.McCorkle on NC 150 west of Salisbury in Rowan County.

== Bibliography ==
Enger, William Randolph. (1973). Samuel Eusebius McCorkle: North Carolina Educator. Oklahoma State University.

Hurley, James F.; Eagan, Julia Good. (1934). The prophet of Zion-Parnassus, Samuel Eusibius McCorkle. Richmond, Published for the authors by Presbyterian Committee of Publication.
