= Thyatira Presbyterian Church, Cemetery, and Manse =

Historic site in Rowan County, North Carolina, US

- U.S. National Register of Historic Places
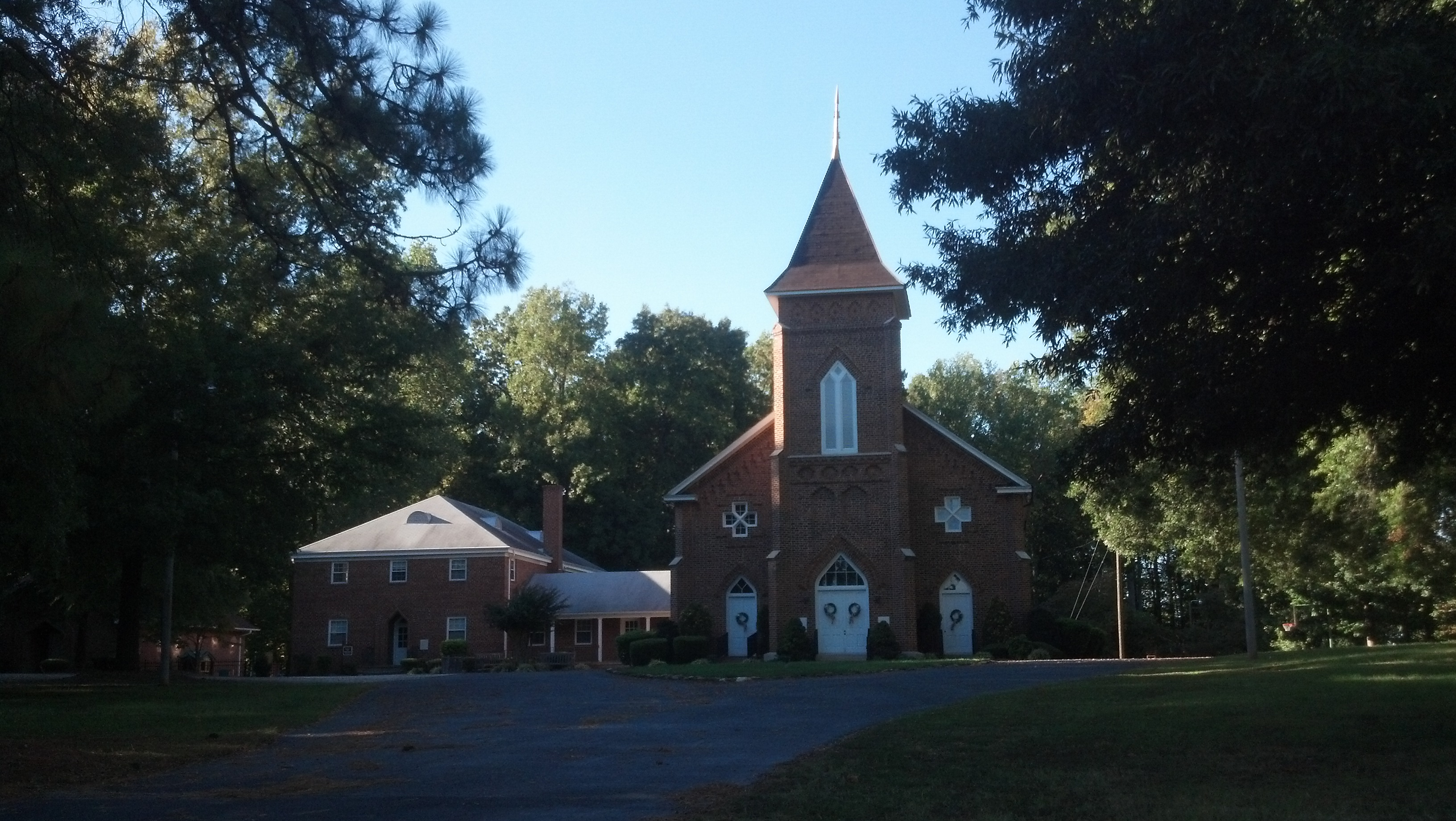

- Location within North Carolina Location within the United States
- Location: 220 White Rd., Mill Bridge, North Carolina
- Coordinates: 35°39′3.0672″N 80°38′13.689″W
- Area: 18 acres (7.3 ha)
- Built: c. 1860
- Architect: Murdoch, William & Raeder, W.
- Architectural style: Vernacular Gothic Revival
- NRHP reference No.: 84002488
- Added to NRHP: February 17, 1984

Thyatira Presbyterian Church, Cemetery, and Manse is a historic church at 220 White Road off NC 150 in Mill Bridge in Rowan County, North Carolina, ten miles west of the town of Salisbury. Presbyterians have been worshipping at this site since at least 1750.

The current Gothic Revival church building was constructed between 1858 and 1860 and added to the National Register of Historic Places in 1984. The church was originally organized by 1750 as Lower Meeting House on its current site on Cathey's Creek. The name was changed to Cathey's Meeting House around 1755. The adjacent cemetery features gravestones dating back to the mid-1750s. The church is still in active use, and the congregation is currently affiliated with the Presbyterian Church (USA).

== Name origin ==
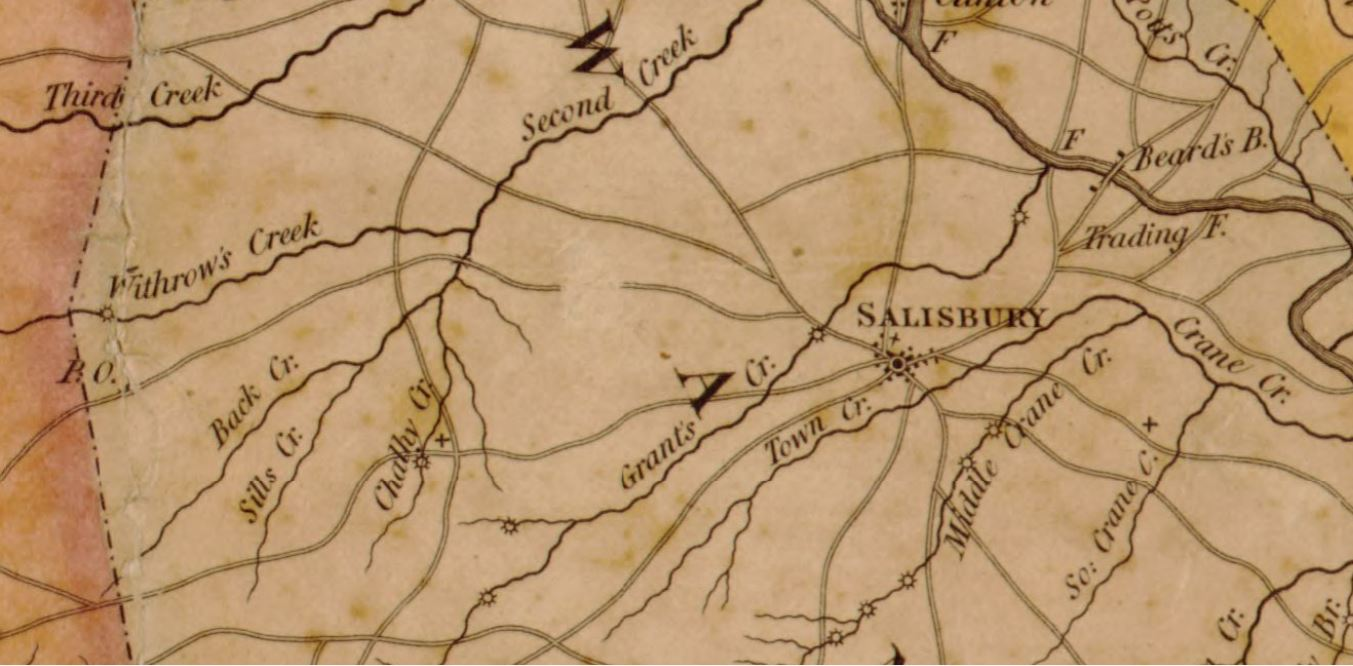
1833 map of portion of Rowan County showing location of Thyatira Church on Cathey's Creek

Thyatira Presbyterian Church had two other names before the final name was appointed. On January 17, 1753 John and Naomi Lynn deeded twelve acres of land to the congregation of Lower Meeting House belonging to the old synod of Philadelphia. On January 18, 1753 twelve more acres on James Cathey's north line was deeded to the same congregation. Lower Meeting House became later known as Cathey's Meeting House.

In 1764 Elihu Spencer and Alexander McWhorter, two visiting Presbyterian ministers, carefully selected the name "Thyatira". Mentioned in the Bible in Acts 16:14 and Revelation 1:11 and 2:18-29, Thyatira was one of the seven churches of Asia. This early church had a record of faith, love, and endurance until an evil temptress, Jezebel, led many of the townspeople into disbelief and immorality, and some of the congregation followed their example. By choosing the name Thyatira, the two ministers demonstrated their knowledge of the Scriptures and left a reminder to the congregation. Church members were called to keep their faith in God and to prevent the prevailing materialism of the frontier society from leading them into immorality or infidelity.

== History ==
The deed for the land on which the church and cemetery are located was made on January 17, 1753. At this time, the land was in Anson County, North Carolina in an area that became Rowan County on March 27, 1753. A copy of the deed is on display in the current church building and reads as follow:

"This Indenture, made the Eighteenth day of January in ye year of our Lord one thousand seven hundred and Fifty Three, between Jno. Lynn of yet County of Anson in the Province of North Carolina, of the one part, And the Congregation Known by Ye Congregation belonging to Ye Lower Meeting house between ye yatkin river & the Cutabo River, adhering to a Minister Licensed From or by a Presbytery belonging to & the old synod of Philadelphia..." (sic)

The deed indicates that there was a congregation prior to the date of the deed. The name was changed by December 1755 to "Cathey's Meeting House". Prior to the American Revolution, the word "church" was reserved for use by the Anglican (Episcopal) Church.

The name of the licensed minister mentioned in the deed is not known. The church evidently was served by itinerant ministers until August 2, 1777 when the Rev. Samuel Eusebius McCorkle was ordained and installed as pastor. Rev. McCorkle was known for his Zion-Parnassus classical school, which was located about a mile from the Church.

During the later part of Rev. McCorkle's pastorate, a split of the congregation between revivalists and non-revivalists occurred in 1805. A revival was sweeping through the area with people shouting, dancing, barking like dogs, swooning and having the "jerks". The congregation was divided on whether this was a true manifestation of the Holy Spirit. Dr. McCorkle believed it was not. Feelings were so strong that 20 or 30 church families, including five elders, left Thyatira to form Back Creek Presbyterian Church on September 6, 1805.

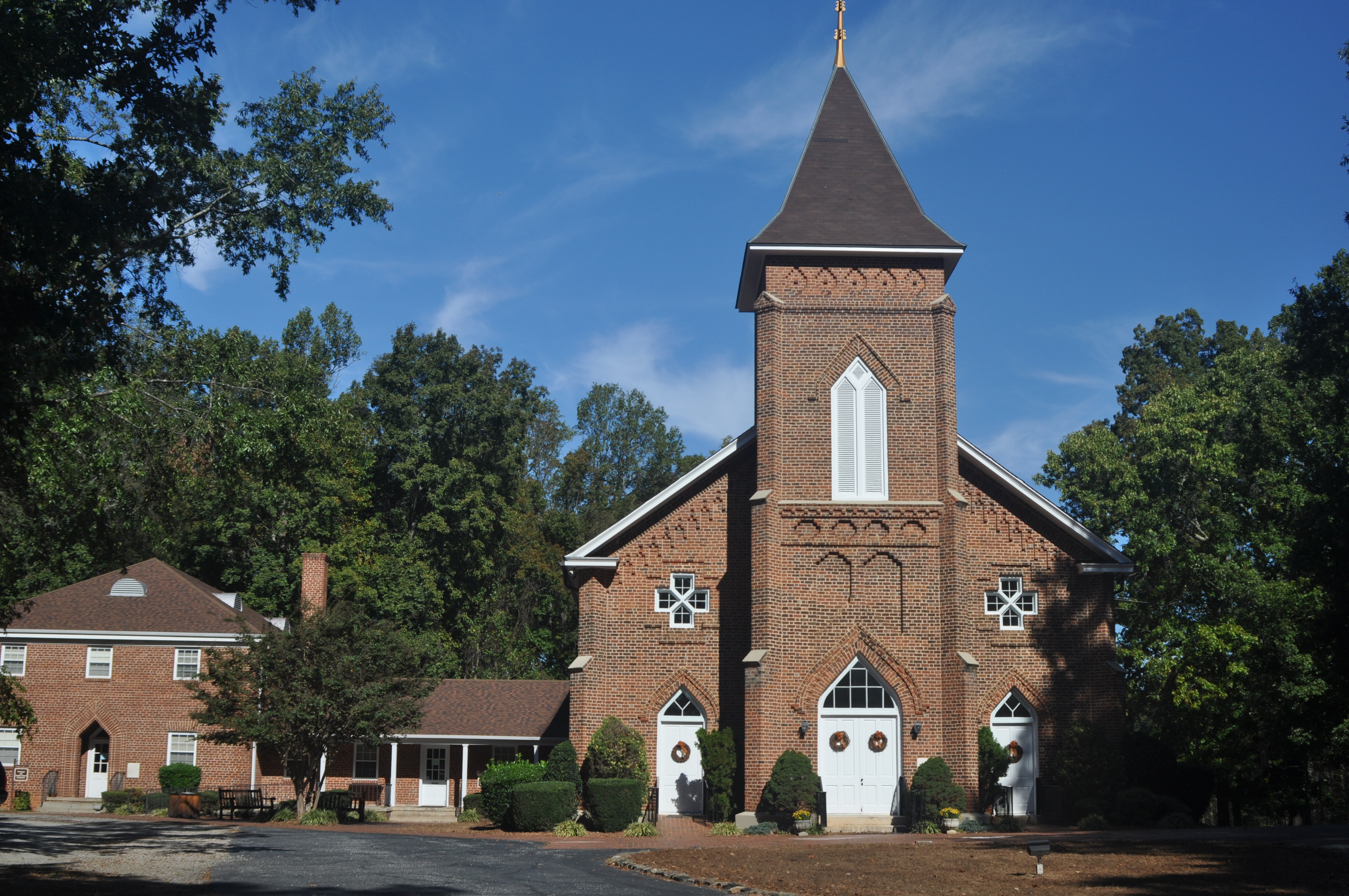
Thyatira Presbyterian Church

There have been four house of worship buildings at Thyatira. The first building was a log building located above and west of the old part of the church cemetery. Nothing is known about the second building. The third church building was very large and had galleries on three sides. One gallery was reserved for use by slaves. The high pulpit was reached by winding stairs and an ornamental sounding board suspended above the minister's head. The church building that stands in the 21st century is a brick structure and was completed in 1860 and renovated in 1864.

== Notable interments ==
The 5 oldest surviving gravestones in the cemetery at Thyatira are:

- John Nisbet, died on November 19, 1755, aged 50
- John Brandon, died on May 15, 1756, aged 65
- William Brandon, died in 1756, aged 30
- Isabella Robison, died on August 16, 1757, aged 28
- James Graham, died on February 1, 1758, aged 88

Graves of notable persons buried at Thyatira include:

- John Knox and Jean Gracy Knox who died in 1758 and 1772, respectively. The memorial stone says that seven of their sons were soldiers in the American Revolution, and that they were great grandparents of James Knox Polk, President of the United States
- Thomas and Naomi Gillespie: Thomas was a commissary in the Salisbury District Brigade and a large land owner in North Carolina and Tennessee. Both Thomas and Naomi died on December 13, 1796, Thomas aged 78 and Naomi aged 69. They were great grandparents of President James K. Polk. They were the first settlers in Rowan County on the west side of the Yadkin River, and lived in the strictest bond of matrimonial friendship for a space of 51 years. Their descendants amount to 63, of who six sons carried them to their place of interment, where they were deposited in the same coffin
- Captain William Armstrong: He was mortally wounded in the Battle of Ramseur's Mill during the American Revolution and died the same day, June 21, 1780 at age 41.
- Captain Thomas Cowan: He was in the Battle of King's Mountain, Battle of Cowpens, and Battle of Ramseur's Mill. He died on December 4, 1817.
- Honorable General Matthew Locke: He was a member of the North Carolina Provincial Congress on three occasions and member of the United States Congress (1793–1799). He died September 7, 1801, at age 71.
- Senator Francis Locke, Jr., Revolutionary War Patriot (1766-1823)
- Colonel James Brandon, Revolutionary War Patriot (1734-1790)
- Samuel Eusebius McCorkle, preacher (1746-1811)
- Elizabeth Maxwell Steele, Revolutionary War patriot (1733-1790); gave 2 bags of gold & silver to Gen. Nathanael Greene, saying, "Take these, General. You need them and I can do without them." Mrs. Steele’s kindness helped improve General Greene's spirit and morale.

The cemetery also contains four tombstones said to mark the graves of pirates. According to tradition, four pirates from the coast of North Carolina made their way inland and settled in Rowan County and became farmers. They were later identified, convicted and executed. Their burial in the Thyatira cemetery was permitted only if the skull and crossbones, or just the crossbones, were used on their gravestones.
