= Thomas Gillespie (North Carolina plantation owner) =

North Carolina planter commissary relative of James K. Polk

Thomas Gillespie, Sr.
- Born: c. 1719; Cecil County, Maryland or Chester County, Pennsylvania
- Died: December 15, 1796 (aged 76–77) plantation on Sills Creek, Rowan County, North Carolina
- Burial place: Thyatira Presbyterian Church Cemetery, Mill Bridge, Rowan County, North Carolina; 35.6506310°N 80.6371002°W
- Spouse(s): Naomi Thompson, m. 1745
- Relatives: President James K. Polk (great grandson)
- Military career
- Allegiance: United States
- Branch: North Carolina militia
- Rank: Quartermaster
- Units: Rowan County Regiment, Salisbury District Brigade

Signature
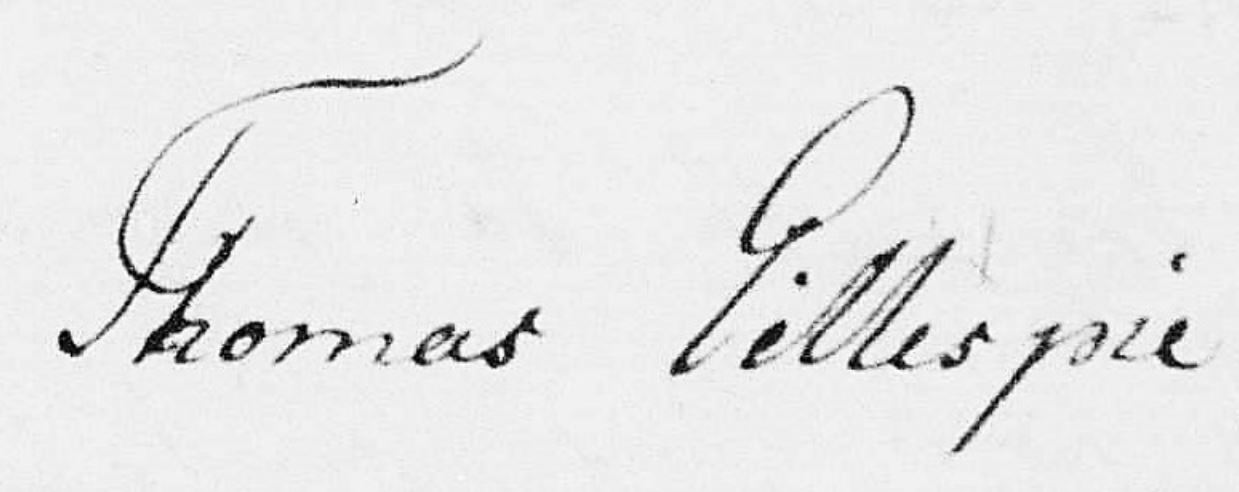

Thomas Gillespie (c. 1719 – December 13, 1796) was the owner of a large plantation in mid-to-late 18th-century North Carolina and served as commissary of the Rowan County Regiment in the North Carolina militia during the American Revolution. He spent his early life in Augusta County, Virginia before migrating to Anson County, North Carolina in about 1750, where he lived most of his life on Sills Creek in the area that became Rowan County, North Carolina in 1753. He and his wife and son were the first white settlers west of the Yadkin River. He owned a plantation of over 1,000 acres on Sills Creek in Rowan County, as well as 6,000 acres in the area of western North Carolina that became part of the state of Tennessee in 1796. He was an early elder in the Thyatira Presbyterian Church in Rowan County, which had been established by 1750. Thomas was the great-grandfather of U.S. President James K. Polk through the lineage of his daughter Lydia, who married Captain James Knox and gave birth to Jane Gracey Knox, mother of the President.

== Early life in Virginia ==
Map from 1751 showing Augusta County, Colony of Virginia and the Yadkin River, Anson County, Province of North Carolina

Thomas Gillespie was born in about 1719. The location of his birth is not documented. Still, tradition says that he was born either in Cecil County, Maryland or New London Township, Chester County, Pennsylvania, which were common points of origin of those who traveled the Great Wagon Road in the 1700s. The names of his parents are not known. He migrated to Augusta County, Virginia in about 1740. There, he married Naomi Thompson on January 1, 1745, in the "Valley of Virginia" with the ceremony performed by Rev. John Craig, pastor of the Tinkling Spring Presbyterian Church in Augusta County, Virginia from 1740–1764. Thomas was probably a member of the Tinkling Springs Presbyterian Church.

Thomas Gillespie owned land in Augusta County, Virginia. On December 1, 1740, Thomas Glassbey (sic Gillespie) in Augusta County, Virginia received 400 acres on a draft of the north river of "Shanando" called the "Long Glade". He paid forty shillings of good and lawful money for this land. The land was bounded on the west by Long Glade and on the east by Naked Creek. This is in the northern part of Augusta County. This is the first legal document about Thomas and places him in Augusta County in December 1740. Thomas Gillespie served in the Virginia Colonial militia in Augusta County in 1742.

== Move to North Carolina ==
Before 1750, Thomas and his wife and young son, James, moved south to Anson County, North Carolina (in the area that became Rowan County, North Carolina in 1753), perhaps because of land that he acquired for his colonial militia service in Virginia. Thomas, Naomi, and their first son (James) are reported to be the first white family to settle west of the Yadkin River in Anson County. The Gillespie plantation was located on Sills Creek. He attended church at the nearby Cathy's Meeting House (founded in the 1740s) on Cathy's Creek, which later became Thyatira Presbyterian Church. It was the first Presbyterian church in this area of western North Carolina.

In 1752, the Province of North Carolina started issuing Granville land grants for vacant land in the Granville District, which included Anson County. After 1780, the State of North Carolina began issuing State Land Grants for vacant land. During his lifetime, Thomas was granted or purchased a total of 2,570 acres of land in Rowan County, beginning with two Granville Land Grants in 1751 and 1752. The 1780 tax list of Rowan County prepared by Adlai Osborne lists Thomas Gillespie, Sen. in Captain John Cowan's District with land valued at 5,529 pounds, as well as his sons Thomas Gillespie, Jr. with land valued at 230 pounds and James Gillespie with land valued at 2,521 pounds. His son, George Gillespie, was listed in Captain George Cowan's District with land valued at 1,430 pounds.

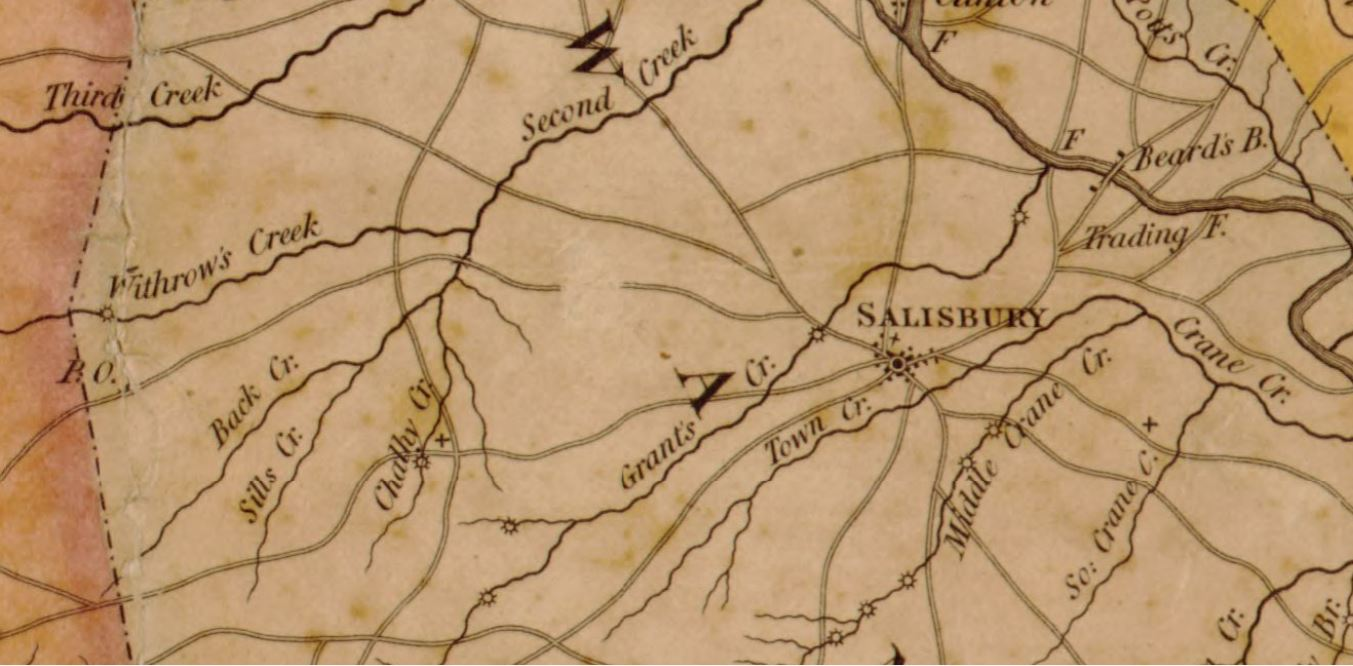
Southwest Rowan County in 1833 showing Sills Creek, Back Creek, and location of Thyatira Church on Chathy Creek

North Carolina Land Records for Thomas Gillespie, Senior
County	Entered	Issued	Grant/Deed	Book	Page	Acres	location
Anson County	unknown	1751	Granville Grant 10, Patent File 1025			640	on the north side of Third Creek at a branch called Buffalow (sic)
Anson County	unknown	1752	Granville Grant 37, Patent File 1026			637	on Sills creek beginning at a hickory and black Oak
Rowan County	unknown	1758	Deed 22	6	151	578	on both sides of Back Creek, a fork of Second Creek, west side of Yadkin River
Rowan County	unknown	1759	Deed 74	6	151	393	on a ridge between Sills and Cathey's Creek, being the waters of Second Creek, on west side of Yadkin River
Rowan County	1778	1779	Deed 10	38	397	590	on the Ridge between Thompsons Mill Creek and Sills Creek, on both sides of the road that leads from Salisbury to Sherrill's Ford.
Rowan County	1778	1779	Deed 18	38	405	84	lying between Back Creek and Sills Creek
Rowan County	1779	1786	State Land Grant 1342, File 2127	67	104	41	on the waters of Second Creek

His large plantation house was located on Sills Creek included more than five rooms. He owned farm machinery, including a cotton gin. The crops that were grown on his plantation included flax, cotton, potatoes, and wheat. He also raised horses and cattle. Thomas owned up to seven slaves to help on his plantation but must have relied extensively on family to help run his large plantation. In 1790, there were 1,742 slaves in 2,432 families in Rowan County. The largest plantation, owned by Richmond Person, had 101 slaves and there were 31 families with ten or more slaves. There were six slaves mentioned in his will and seven slaves enumerated in the 1790 Census in Rowan County for Thomas Gillespie, Sr.

== Family ==
Thomas and Naomi Gillespie had ten children. Only the oldest son, James, was born in Augusta County. The others were all born in Rowan County, North Carolina. Four of his children died in Tennessee, where Thomas had extensive land holdings.

1. James Gillespie (c. 1745 – before 1787): He died in Rowan County, North Carolina. He married Jane Graham (before 1747 – 1823) on January 9, 1765. He served in the Revolutionary War.
2. Martha (Gillespie) Allison (c. 1747 – after 1796): She died in Rowan County, North Carolina. She married Thomas Allison, Sr. (1746–-1751 – about 1780) in Rowan County on January 20, 1770. She had a son, Thomas Allison, Jr.
3. Isaac Lemuel Gillespie (March 28, 1750 – December 24, 1826): He died in Williamson County, Tennessee and was buried in the Moses Steele Cemetery on the land he inherited from his father on Flat Creek, Duck River. He married Mary Ann McGuire (February 13, 1770 – September 20, 1845) on April 12, 1791, in Rowan County. He served as a private in the 3rd North Carolina Regiment in Captain Alexander Brevard's Company during the American Revolution.
4. George Gillespie (July 22, 1751 – August 31, 1818): He died in Gallatin or Bethpage, Sumner County, Tennessee and was buried at the Old Hopewell Missionary Baptist Church Cemetery in Sumner County. He married Mary Graham (May 32, 1751 – 1815) on April 8, 1771, in Rowan County. He provided patriotic services during the Revolutionary War. He may have fought at the Battle of Guilford Courthouse.
5. Lydia (Gillespie) Knox Wallace (1753–1828): She died in Mecklenburg County, North Carolina. She married Capt James Knox (c. 1752 – c. 1794) on November 4, 1772 in Rowan County. James was a Captain in the Mecklenburg County Regiment during the American Revolution. Lydia and James had three children: Robert Knox (1774–1869), Naomi Knox (1775–1854), and Jane Gracy Knox (1776–1852). Jane Gracy Knox married Samuel Polk (1772–1827) on December 25, 1794. While living in a log cabin in Pineville, Mecklenburg County, North Carolina, Jane and Samuel had ten children. The first child was James Knox Polk (1795–1849), the 11th President of the United States. Lydia later married Ezekial Wallace on March 19, 1797 in Mecklenburg County, North Carolina
6. Thomas Gillespie, Jr. (c. 1755 – c. 1830): He died in Williamson County, Tennessee after moving there after 1805 and was buried in the Moses Steele Cemetery near Flat Creek in Williamson County. He married Mary Jane Luckey (c. 1763 – unknown) on September 5, 1785 in Rowan County.
7. Alexander Gillespie (c. 1759 – before December 15, 1800): He died in Rowan County. He did not marry.
8. David Gillespie (1763 – September 18, 1834): He died in Williamson County, Tennessee and was buried on the land on Flat Creek, Duck River that he inherited from his father. He married Mary Luckey (1770/80–1814) in 1785 and later married Mary Marlin/Martin on February 12, 1814, in Tennessee. He was employed by his father during the American Revolution, hauling supplies in a wagon for the troops.
9. John Gillespie (c. 1762 – c. 1825): He died in Alabama. He married Margaret Kerr (c. 1769 – c. 1843) on January 31, 1786 in Rowan County
10. Robert Gillespie (1772–1843): He died in Rowan County, North Carolina. He married Sarah "Sally" Thornton (1781–1850) before 1808 in Rowan County.

== Military service ==
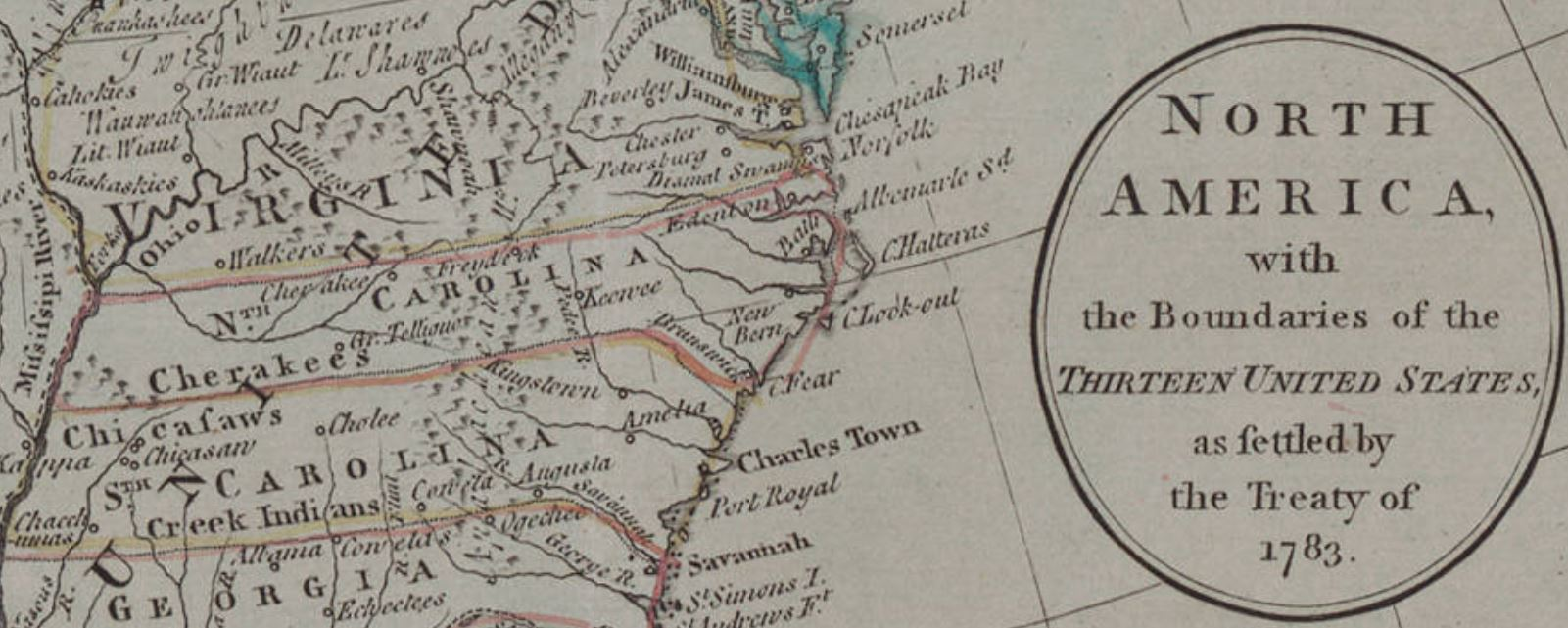
North Carolina in 1783

During the American Revolution, Thomas served in at least 1780 and 1781 as a commissary under General Griffith Rutherford, commander of the Rowan County Regiment (active from 1775–1783), which was under the Salisbury District Brigade (active from 1776–1783). General Rutherford lived near Gillespie on Grants Creek and was also a large land owner, like Thomas. Thomas was one of five commissaries under a Quartermaster General, Joseph Marbury. As commissary, Thomas was responsible for provisioning the soldiers in the brigade, which included as many as 1,400 to 2,000 men.

Non-commissioned officers were entitled to receive 1,000 acres of land for their service in the American Revolution. Thomas received Grants of 4,000 and 1,000 acres of land on Flat Creek, Duck River for his Revolutionary War services. This land was originally located in North Carolina and became part of Tennessee on June 1, 1796, and part of Williamson County, Tennessee in 1799. This land was inherited by his male children through his will. The initial application for this grant was on October 27, 1783. This grant, No. 80, was entered on pages 216 and 217 of Book A. The land was survey on February 21, 1785, by H. Rutherford. The grant was given on April 25, 1807, to David and Isaac Gillespie, after their father's death.

Thomas also received bounty land for his service in 1786 (Grant No. 676) and 1787 (Grants Nos. 798, 802, and 809 in the State of Franklin, which later became Washington County, Tennessee. His son, George, also received bounty land in Sumner County, Tennessee for his service in the war.

=== Flat Creek community ===
Flat Creek is a historic community that was established in 1799 in the extreme southeast corner of Williamson County, Tennessee. It was founded primarily by Revolutionary War veterans awarded claims for their service. Isaac Gillespie, Thomas Gillespie, Jr., and David Gillespie inherited land in Flat Creek from their father and they were buried at Moses Steele Cemetery near Flat Creek. The Moses Steel Cemetery is named for Moses Steele, who was originally from Mecklenburg County, North Carolina. The land on which the cemetery is located was originally purchased by Moses from Thomas Gillespie's 4,000-acre bounty land. The Smithson–McCall Farm was built on 528 acres of Thomas Gillespie's 4,000 acres that were willed to his son David and conveyed to him in 1808. Samuel Henderson purchased 125 acres from David in 1813 to build what later became the Smithson-McCall farm.

== Religion ==
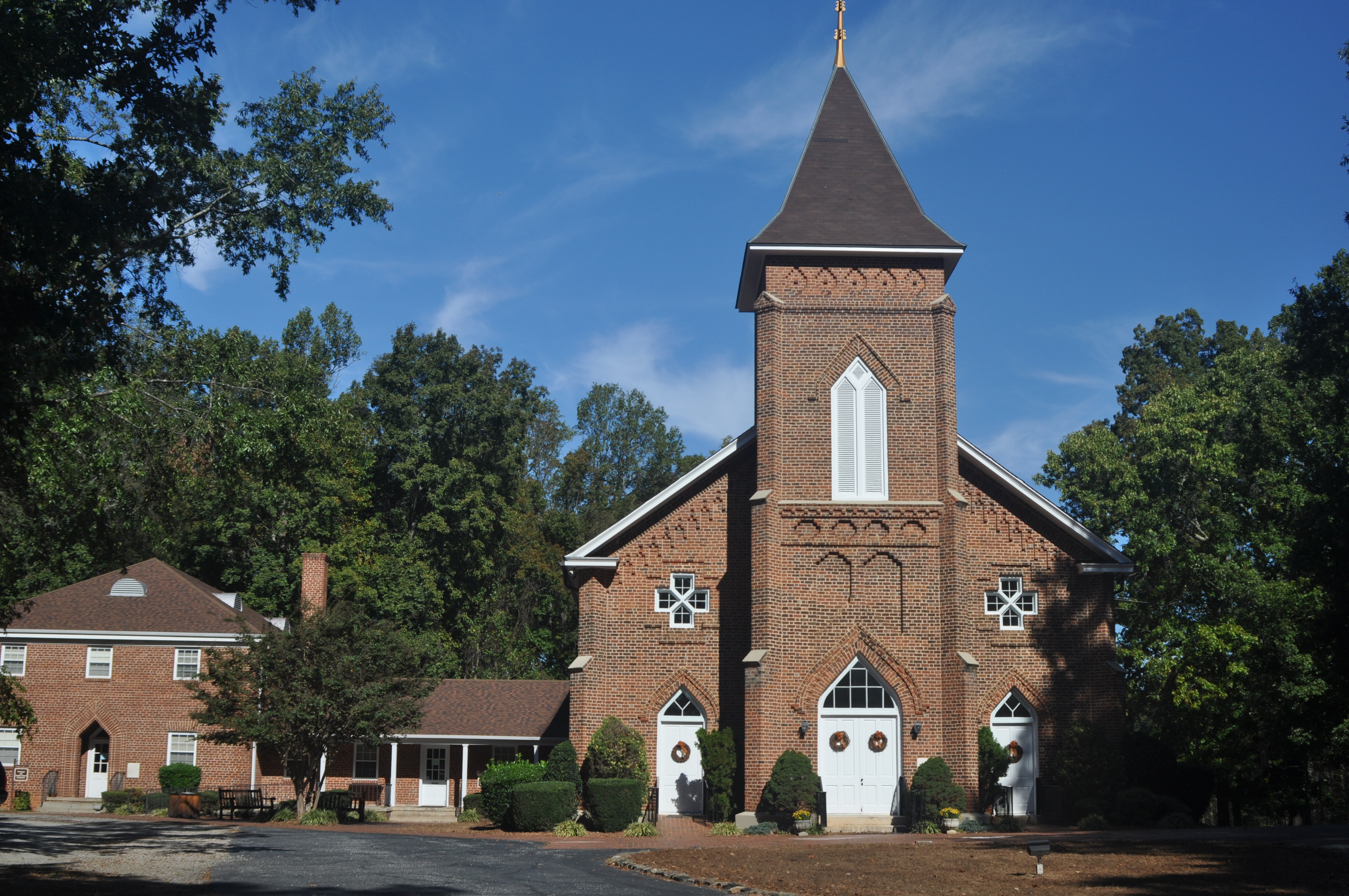
Thyatira Presbyterian Church

Thomas was a devout Presbyterian and one of the early members of a Presbyterian Meeting House established before 1753 at the headwaters of the 2nd Creek in Anson County (later became Rowan County in 1753). The congregation became Cathey's Meeting House and later the Thyatira Presbyterian Church. It is the oldest Presbyterian congregation west of the Yadkin River. It is located near the town of Mill Bridge on Cathey's Creek, which is near Sills Creek and Back Creek where Thomas lived. After his death, his living children remained with the church until 1805 when there was a split in the congregation between revivalists and anti-revivalists. Thirty families and five church elders, including Thomas Gillespie, Jr. left the church to form the revivalist Back Creek Presbyterian Church. The Thyatira church included a slave gallery for slaves to participate in services.

== Additional land acquisitions ==
Thomas entered claims for grants of additional land in Tennessee from 1778 to 1784 that was issued between 1782 and 1788. There is no evidence that Thomas Gillespie, Sr. took up residence in Tennessee on any of these lands. However, his sons, Isaac, George, Thomas (Jr.), and David, took up residence in Williamson County in the early 1800s on the 5,000 acres that he obtained for his military service. Thomas may have sold this additional land in Washington and Green Counties. Washington County, North Carolina became Washington County, Tennessee in 1796. Greene County was formed in 1783 from Washington County, North Carolina and became part of Tennessee in 1796. The following list shows the location of the 1,333 acres of land that Thomas Gillespie acquired in Greene and Washington Counties:

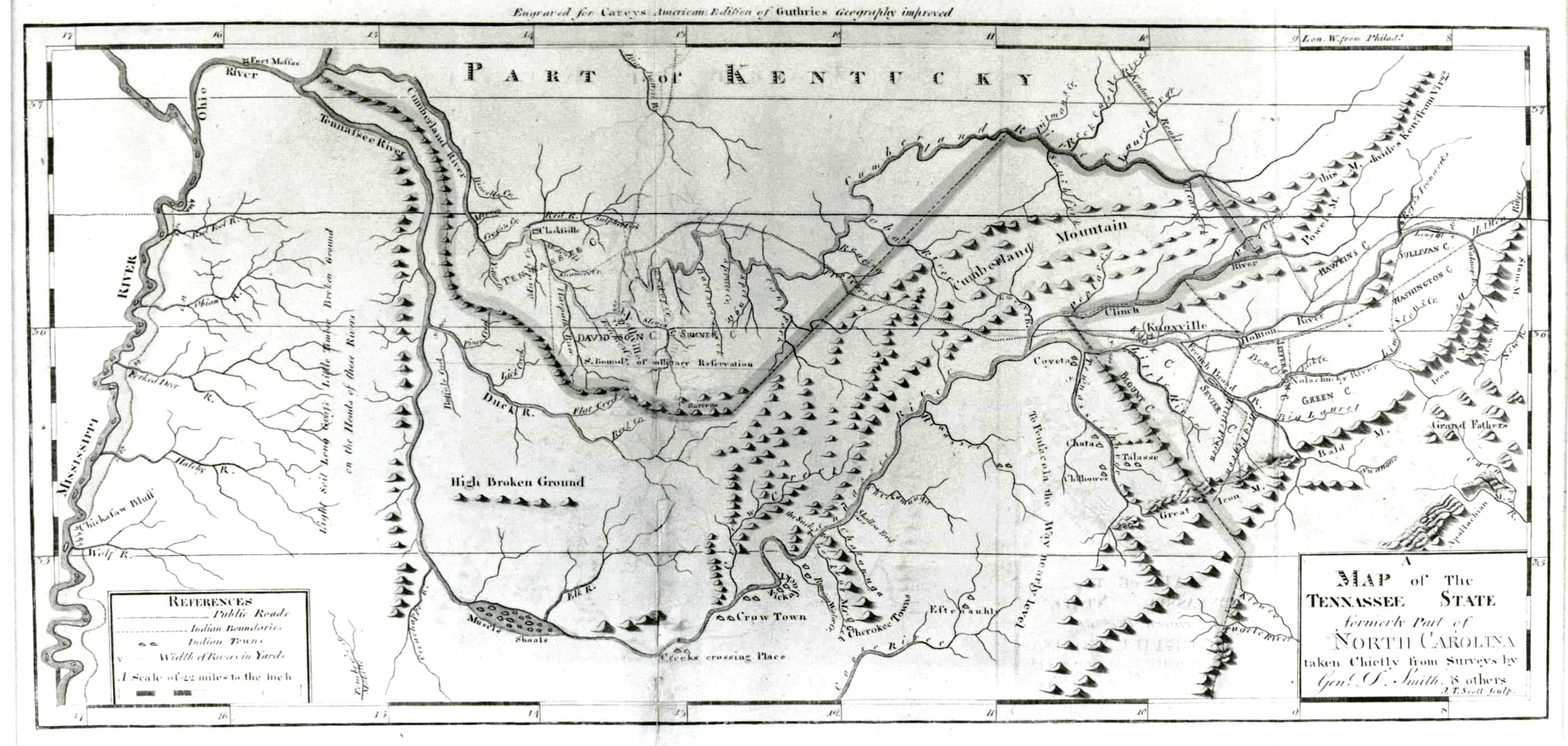
1796 Map of Tennessee showing Flat Creek, Duck River in Middle District, Greene County, Washington County

County	Entered	Issued	Grant	Book	Page	Acres	Description
Washington County, North Carolina	1778	1782	97 (Warrant 498)	47	47	83	south side of Nolachucky River (sic)
Greene County, Tennessee	1784	1786	76 Warrant 1412, Grant 76	58	437	100	beginning at a stake on Dumplin Creek
Greene County, Tennessee	1783	1786	45 (Warrant 371)	59	406	200	upon Nolachuckie River (sic)
Greene County, Tennessee	1778	1786	24 Warrant 456	59	385	100	upon Dumplin Creek
Greene County, Tennessee	1783	1786	23 Warrant 469	59	384	200	upon Dumplin Creek
Washington County, North Carolina	1780	1787	798 Warrant 2668, Grant 798	64	151	150	on Rock House branch
Washington County, North Carolina	1781	1787	805 Warrant 2788	64	154	100	joining said Gillespies Survey of one hundred and fifty acres on the Rock House Branch
Washington County, North Carolina	1778	1787	794 Warrant 756	64	150	150	on Rock House Branch
Greene County, Tennessee	1778	1788	(Warrant 92)			200	lying on its North side of Clinch River in its upper end of its first bend
Middle District, Tennessee		1788	Number 2893			4,000	on the north side of Flat Creek

== Death ==
Thomas Gillespie died on December 13, 1796, in Rowan County, North Carolina, and is buried in the same grave and in the same coffin with his wife Naomi, who had died just hours before him, in the Thyatira Presbyterian Church Cemetery on Cathey's Creek in Mill Bridge, Rowan County, North Carolina. On the tombstone is carved the date Dec 12th, 1796; however, church records shows the date as the 13th, which was a Tuesday. The ages confirm that Thomas was born about 1719 and Naomi about 1727.

An obituary appeared shortly after his death in the North Carolina Journal on January 9, 1797. It is quoted in a book by Lingle about the history of the Thyatira Church. It read as follows:

"Died at 2 p.m. on Tuesday, the 13th of December, Mrs. Naomi Gillespie aged 69; at 10 o'clock the same evening, Mr. Thomas Gillespie aged 78. They were the first settlers in Rowan County on the West-Side of the Yadkin River, and lived in the strictest bond of matrimonial friendship for the space of 55 years. Their descendants amount to 65, of whom six sons carried them to their place of interment, where they were deposited in the same coffin. The history of North Carolina has perhaps never furnished a similar instance since its first settlement."

== Will ==
Seven of his eight sons were living at the time of his death: Isaac, George, Thomas, Alexander, David, John, and Robert. James had predeceased him. Both his daughters, Martha and Lydia, were still alive at the time of his death. His sons, Thomas Gillespie, Jr. and Robert Gillespie, were named executors of Thomas Gillespie, Sr.'s will written on November 15, 1796 (a little less than a month before he died). He bequeathed the following to his wife and children in his will:

- His wife, Naomi Gillespie, was to get the choice of five rooms in his house and all that part of the cleared land on the west side between his two sons, Alexander and Robert Gillespie. She was also to receive her bed and furniture, one black horse, her dresser and kitchen furniture, the female slaves Liza and Fan, and two cows and calves during her natural lifetime. The slave Liza was to be the property of his sons Thomas, David and Isaac after she died.
- Martha Allison (widow) inherited one silver dollar.
- George Gillespie inherited one silver dollar.
- Thomas Gillespie, Jr. inherited 1,000 acres of land on Flat Creek, Duck River and one silver dollar.
- Isaac Gillespie inherited 600 acres of land on Flat Creek, Duck River
- John Gillespie inherited 660 acres of land on Flat Creek, Duck River, as well as Thomas's clothes, saddle and young black mare.
- David Gillespie inherited 400 acres of land on Flat Creek, Duck River
- Alexander inherited Thomas's plantation on Sills Creek, where he was living at the time of his death, as well as 600 acres on Flat Creek, Duck River. He also inherited a slave boy named Peter and a female slave named Violet.
- Robert Gillespie inherited 278 acres of land by the name of Baily Place and 600 acres of land on Flat Creek, Duck River. He also inherited a Thomas's male slave named Dick, and a female slave named Phoebe.
- James Gillespie's son Thomas, George Gillespie's sons Thomas and Jacob, Thomas Allison, Thomas Knox, and Issac Gillespie's son Thomas Gillespie inherited jointly 1,000 acres of land in Greene County, on the Duck River. The title was to be made by James Kerr, Esq. of Iredell County.

== DNA ==
There are several descendants of Thomas Gillespie that have tested for DNA in his son George and Issac's families. The Y-DNA haplogroup for these descendants is I2b 126 137 L369 (I-M223).
