= Rowan Museum =

Coordinates: 35°40′07″N 80°28′08″W

The Rowan Museum is located in a 19th-century courthouse in Salisbury, North Carolina that survived Stoneman’s Raid. The building is considered to be one of the finest examples of antebellum architecture in North Carolina. The museum is dedicated to the history of Rowan County.

== History ==
Listed on the National Register of National Places in March 1970. The courthouse was built and completed by Conrad and Williams contractors between 1855 and 1857. The courthouse is a two-story building with a hexastyle colossal Doric portico along the front facade. A new courthouse was built in 1914 and is now located next door. The courthouse was transformed into the Community Building and has housed the Rowan Museum since 2001, when it moved from the Utzman-Chambers House.

Among the museum's holdings is the Old Stone House, a Georgian two-story structure built in 1766 near present-day Granite Quarry by Michael Braun, a wheelwright, printer and carpenter. The house is the oldest in Rowan County and one of the State's few remaining stone houses. Descendants or Braun and the Fisher family worked to preserve the house in the 1950s, when there was the possibility of it being torn down so its rock could be used for roads. The families donated the restored house to the museum in 1966. Other historic properties managed by the museum include the China Grove Roller Mill in China Grove, NC. The Utzman-Chambers House is no longer run by the Rowan Museum as of July 2024, but had previously remained in its possession for many years.

== Events ==
On the first floor are exhibits that display the history of Rowan County. The second floor of the museum features the Messinger Room which displays the remnants of a 19th-century courthouse. It is often rented for business and private events during the year. Throughout the year the museum hosts an Antique Show, Germafest, Spring Frolic, summer camps, and Old Stone Christmas.
