= Salisbury Historic District =

Historic district in North Carolina, United States

- U.S. National Register of Historic Places
- U.S. Historic district
- Location within North Carolina Location within the United States
- Location: Roughly bounded by Jackson, Innes, Caldwell, Marsh, Church, E. Bank, Lee, and Liberty Sts.; also 117 S. Lee St.; also roughly bounded by Ellis St., Monroe St., Church St., Bank St., S. Main St., and McCubbins St.; also portions of E. Council, E. Innes, Lee, and E. Liberty Sts. between Main and Depot Sts., Salisbury, North Carolina
- Coordinates: 35°40′04″N 80°28′10″W
- Area: 140.5 acres (56.9 ha)
- Built: 1770
- Architectural style: Late Victorian, Colonial Revival, Bungalow/craftsman, Foursquare, Early Commercial
- NRHP reference No.: 75001289, 88000141 (Boundary Increase), 89000760 (Boundary Increase), 00000826 (Boundary Increase)
- Added to NRHP: November 12, 1975, January 6, 1988 (Boundary Increase), July 6, 1989 (Boundary Increase), July 20, 2000 (Boundary Increase)

Salisbury Historic District is a national historic district located at Salisbury, Rowan County, North Carolina. The district encompasses 348 contributing buildings and 1 contributing site in the central business district and surrounding residential sections of Salisbury. It includes notable examples of Late Victorian, Colonial Revival, and Bungalow / American Craftsman style architecture. Located in the district are the separately listed Maxwell Chambers House, McNeely-Strachan House, Archibald Henderson Law Office, and the former Rowan County Courthouse. Other notable buildings include the tower of the former First Presbyterian Church (1891-1893), Rowan County Courthouse (1914), Conrad Brem House, Kluttz's Drug Store (c. 1859), Bell Building (c. 1900), Washington Building (c. 1900), Grubb-Wallace Building, Hedrick Block, Empire Hotel, St. Luke's Episcopal Church (1827-1828), Soldiers Memorial A.M.E. Zion Church (1910-1913), U.S. Post Office and Courthouse (1909), City Hall (1926), Salisbury Fire House and City Building (1897).

It was listed on the National Register of Historic Places in 1975, with boundary increases in 1988, 1989, and 2000.
