= Josephus Hall House =

Historic house in North Carolina, United States

- McNeely–Strachan House
- U.S. National Register of Historic Places
- U.S. Historic district – Contributing property
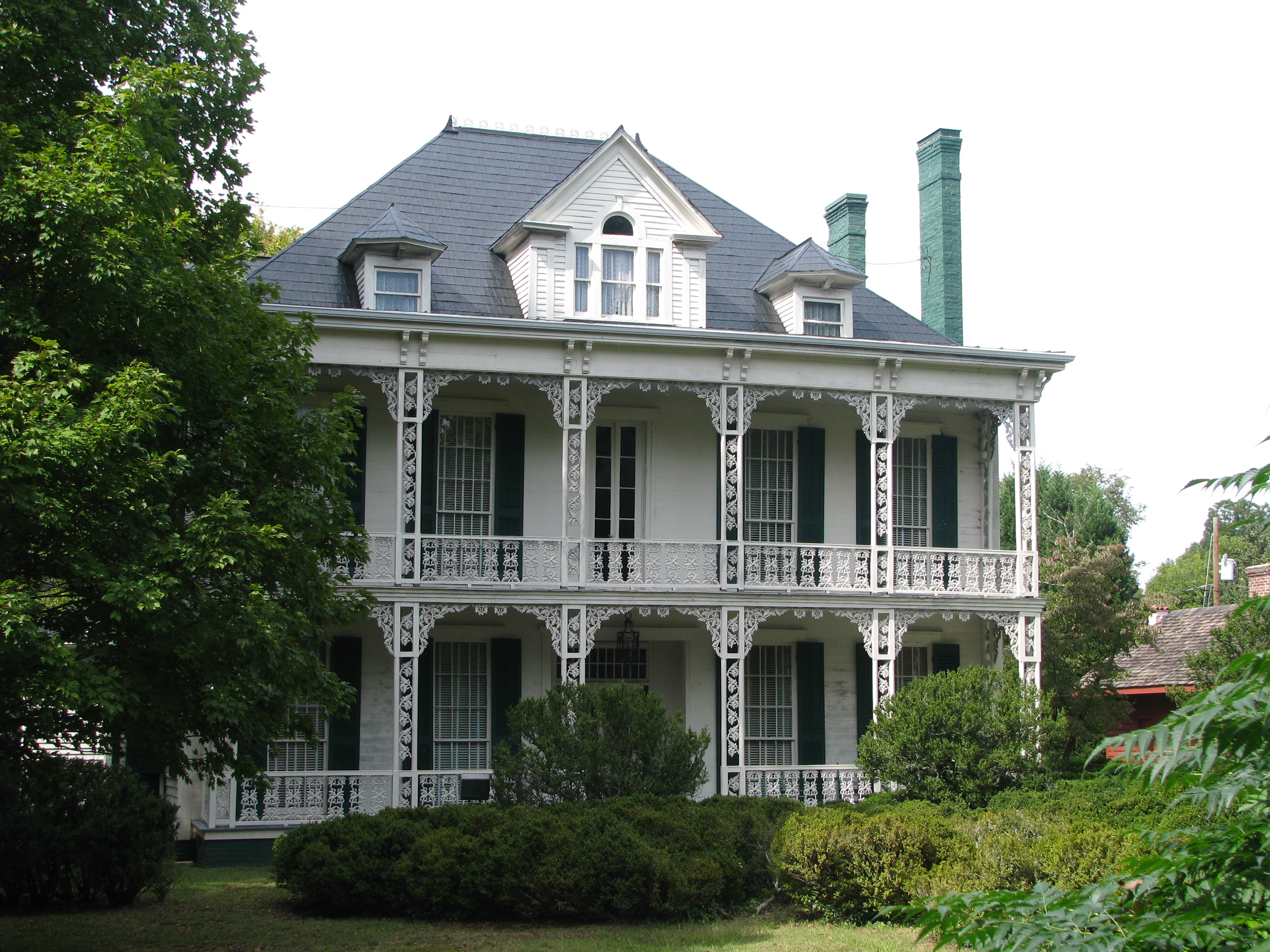
- McNeely–Strachan House, September 2012

- Location within North Carolina Location within the United States
- Location: 226 S. Jackson St., Salisbury, North Carolina
- Coordinates: 35°40′4″N 80°28′27″W
- Area: 0.5 acres (0.20 ha)
- Built: c. 1820, c. 1855, 1911
- Architectural style: Greek Revival, Late Victorian, Federal
- NRHP reference No.: 72000994
- Added to NRHP: February 1, 1972

The Josephus Hall House, also known as the McNeely–Strachan House and Salisbury Academy, is a historic home located at Salisbury, Rowan County, North Carolina, United States. It was built about 1820, as a two-story, frame dwelling. It was remodeled in the 1850s to add its distinctive two-tier flat roofed front porch. The porch features a five bay ornamental cast iron arcade in a grapevine pattern. The roof was modified to the hipped roof form and exterior chimneys rebuilt in 1911. The interior has Federal, Greek Revival, and Late Victorian-style design elements. The building housed the Salisbury Academy girls' school from about 1820 to 1825.

It was listed on the National Register of Historic Places in 1972. It is located in the Salisbury Historic District.

== History ==
The house was built in 1820 for the Salisbury Female Academy.

Five years later, Maxwell Chambers and his half-sister Rebecca Troy lived there. Later, Chambers moved and Sheriff Chaffin of Davie County, North Carolina bought it and rented it.

Rowan County native Dr. Josephus Hall, who returned to Salisbury in 1853, bought the house along with his wife Mary Cowan in 1859 for $3,500. The purchase included stables and slaves' quarters. Hall added $125 worth of decorative ironwork. During the Civil War, Hall served as a surgeon for the Confederate Prison. When Union troops invaded, they took over the front part of the house, paying rent, and Hall and his family lived in the back.

Hall died in 1873. When his wife died in 1902, she left all her property to daughter Henrietta, who was married to Julius D. McNeely. Their daughter Henrietta (McNeely) Strachan had married Waverly B. Strachan in 1901, and had a daughter Mildred Strachan. A 1938 photo by Frances Benjamin Johnston calls the house the McNeely House; information about the photo also refers to a Mrs. W. B. Strachan as being associated with the house at that time. The 1971 NRHP nomination says "Descendants of the Halls (among whom were the McNeelys and the Strachans from whom comes the present name of the house) have lived there for over a hundred years."

Hall's descendants continued to live in the house until 1972, at which time the Historic Salisbury Foundation bought it along with some original furnishings. In September 2019, Hall family members donated three other items of furniture that had once been in the house.
