= John S. Henderson =

American politician

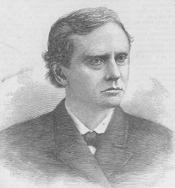
John Steele Henderson

John Steele Henderson (January 6, 1846 – October 9, 1916) was a Representative for North Carolina in the United States House of Representatives.

== Biography ==
Born near Salisbury, Rowan County, North Carolina in 1846, the son of Archibald and Barbara Bynum Henderson, John S. Henderson attended a private school in Melville, N.C. He entered the University of North Carolina at Chapel Hill in January 1862 and left in November 1864 to join the Confederate Army as a private in Company B, Tenth Regiment, North Carolina State Troops. He served throughout the Civil War, and graduated in Law from the University of North Carolina in 1865 without reentering.

Henderson obtained a County Court license in June 1866 and a Superior Court license in June 1867, and was appointed in June 1866 as Register of Deeds for Rowan County, North Carolina, in which capacity he served until September 1868, when he resigned. Henderson was a delegate to the State constitutional convention in 1875, became a member of the State House of Representatives in 1876, and served in the State Senate in 1878. He was elected by the General Assembly in 1881 as one of the three Commissioners to codify the statute laws of the State. In June 1884 Henderson was elected Presiding Justice of the Inferior Court of Rowan County. He was elected as a Democrat to the Forty-ninth and to the four succeeding Congresses (March 4, 1885 – March 3, 1895). He was appointed Chairman of the Committee on the Post Office and Post Roads (Fifty-second and Fifty-third Congresses).

He resumed the practice of law in Salisbury, N.C., and was elected to the North Carolina State Senate in 1900 and 1902. In 1900 he became a member of the Board of Aldermen.

He was married to Elizabeth Brownrigg Cain and was the father of Archibald Henderson, Mary Ferrand Henderson, and Elizabeth Brownrigg Henderson Cotten.

John S. Henderson died in Salisbury, North Carolina on October 9, 1916, and was interred in Chestnut Hill Cemetery.

U.S. House of Representatives
Preceded by Tyre York	Member of the U.S. House of Representatives from North Carolina's 7th congressional district 1885–1895	Succeeded by Alonzo C. Shuford
