= St. John's Lutheran Church (Salisbury, North Carolina) =

Church in Salisbury, North Carolina, US

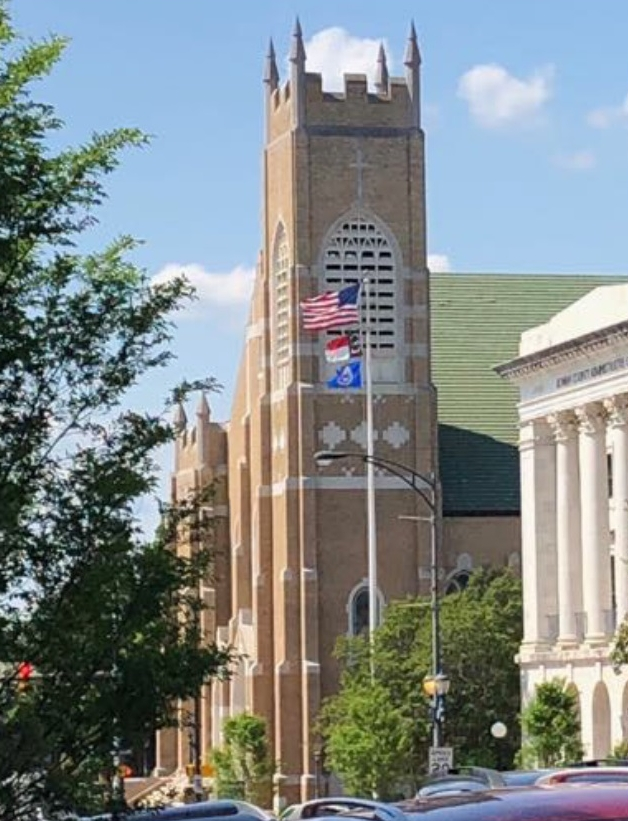

Religion
- Affiliation: Evangelical Lutheran Church in America
- District: North Carolina Synod
- Leadership: Bishop Emily Hartner

Location
- Location: Salisbury, North Carolina, United States

St. John's Lutheran Church is an Evangelical Lutheran Church in America congregation in Salisbury, North Carolina. It reported 778 confirmed members as of 2025.

== History ==
St. John's Lutheran Church began in 1747, with its first building a log structure built in 1768 on North Lee Street, John Lewis Beard deeded the land on September 9 of that year for the "Evangelical Lutheran Congregation in the township of Salisbury" as well as “the High Church of England" (which became the Episcopal Church) and to “the Reformed Calvin ministers” (Presbyterian Church). Beard had buried his daughter on the land and was concerned something could happen to the land, so he gave it to the church, and a cemetery still occupies the site today. Michael Braun, Michael More, Caspar Guenther, and Peter Reeb were listed as trustees and might be thought of as the first church council.

A second building was built by St. John's and the Episcopalians.

In 1857 St. John's moved to a larger location at North Main and Liberty Streets.

Plans for a new building were made starting in 1923, and groundbreaking took place in 1925. The 900-seat sanctuary in the church's current location on West Innes Street had its first worship service January 2, 1927.

St. John's kindergarten began in 1946. Its goal was to help children who would soon start first grade, with a Christian emphasis.

The education building and chapel were added in 1967, followed by a child development center in 1999.

In 2006, St. John's paid $1.5 million for property on Fulton Street that included the former K-Town Furniture, which had closed in 2005 after 33 years in a former Winn Dixie building. Five years later, the church decided to tear down that building because getting there from the main building required crossing the street, and without an expensive upgrade, its foundation could not support youth activities and contemporary worship, both of which needed more space. Renovations were planned in the building that included the sanctuary and fellowship hall, and temporary locations for some activities and programs were needed. The church also voted to buy the Woodson Law Firm building at West Council and North Church Streets.

Groundbreaking for a $5.9 million youth and contemporary worship center took place February 16, 2014. The building was first used in August 2015 and dedicated September 12. Included were the Faith Center, which seated 350 and had a 20-by-12-foot (6.1 m × 3.7 m) screen. The high school space was called Fuel, named for a service station that once stood on part of the church site. The Well for middle school youth was at the site of a well in the center of the room.
