= The Plaza (Salisbury, North Carolina) =

- U.S. Historic district – Contributing property
- Location: 116 S. Jackson St., Salisbury, North Carolina
- Built: 1909-1911
- Architectural style: Renaissance Revival

The Wallace Building, formerly known as, The Plaza, is the tallest building in Salisbury, North Carolina. When built between 1909 and 1911, at seven stories tall, it was believed to be the tallest building in North Carolina. Called The Grubb Building for owner Clay Grubb, the Renaissance Revival skyscraper was one of four buildings in the town designed by architect Frank Milburn. When Grubb died in 1913, he still owed $122,500, and his building was sold at auction. The Wallace Family bought the building for $115,000 in 1914 and it became known as the Wallace Building. The name has since changed back to the Wallace Building with the recent purchase by the Wallace’s from the city in June 2026. The building had fewer tenants after doctors moved out to be closer to Rowan Memorial Hospital. In 1960, the building was modernized, and the next year, Wallace Building Associates bought it. The building was sold again in 1978, at a time when it was mostly empty. Ralph and Anne Ketner bought the Wallace Building in 1989, renovated it and gave it to the city. At that time it had offices and residences. It is located in the Salisbury Historic District.

The Ketners required the city to keep the building for at least 30 years. Because most of the building's uses were private, the city decided it should not be spending so much money on it. The city agreed in October 2022 to a request for proposals for purchase and development with existing tenants respected.

On August 5, 2025, the Salisbury City Council voted to sell The Plaza for about $2.2 million to the Wallace family. Lane Wallace of LW Ventures said the plan is to renovate the building at a cost of $7 million with historic preservation a priority. Developer Clay Grubb, a descendant of the man who built The Plaza, is involved. The Wallace building is now under renovation with all of the former office space being turned into 15 short term rentals AirBnB style. The 20 residential apartments are being modernized with the goal of tenants being able to rent beginning in 2027.
