= Salisbury Mall =

Salisbury Mall can refer to:

- Salisbury Mall (Maryland), a former mall in Salisbury, Maryland
- Salisbury Mall (North Carolina) in Salisbury, North Carolina
