= Christian Reid =

American novelist

Frances Tiernan
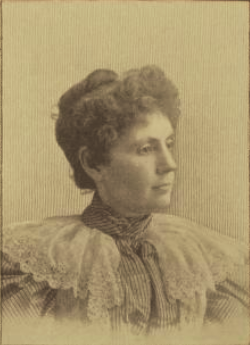
- Born: Frances Christine Fisher; July 5, 1846; Salisbury, North Carolina, U.S.
- Died: March 24, 1920 (aged 73); Salisbury, North Carolina
- Resting place: Chestnut Hill Cemetery, Salisbury, North Carolina
- Education: St. Mary's College
- Occupation: Author
- Spouse: James Marquis Tiernan (m. 1887; died 1898)
- Parent(s): Charles Frederick Fisher (father); Elizabeth Clarissa Caldwell (mother)
- Relatives: Elizabeth Brownrigg Henderson Cotten (cousin); Archibald Henderson (cousin)
- Writing career
- Pen name: Christian Reid
- Language: English
- Genres: novels, short stories
- Notable work: The Land of the Sky
- Notable awards: Laetare Medal

Frances Tiernan (née, Fisher; pen name, Christian Reid; July 5, 1846 – March 24, 1920) was an American author who wrote more than 50 novels, most notably The Land of the Sky. Reared as a Roman Catholic, she grew up in the Southern United States.

In 1870, she published her first novel, Valerie Aylmer. In the following year, she published in Appletons' Journal a novel entitled Morton House, a story of Southern life. Even after publishing nearly 50 novels, she considered this her best work.

In 1887, she married James M. Tiernan, of Maryland. She accompanied him to Mexico where he had mining interests. There, she collected material for her novel, The Land of the Sun. She also wrote several short stories set in Mexico, notably The Pictures of Las Cruces, which appeared in Lippincott's Monthly Magazine, and which was translated and published in L'Illustration of Paris. After her husband's death in 1898, Tiernan made her home in New York City before returning to the family home in Salisbury in which she was born. Though she never claimed to be a poet, some of her verses were published.

In 1909, Tiernan was awarded the Laetare Medal by the University of Notre Dame in Indiana. This medal is given annually to a lay member of the Catholic Church for distinguished services in literature, art, science, or philosophy. Tiernan was the first Southerner to be awarded the medal.

== Early years and education ==
Frances Christine Fisher was born the third of three children in Salisbury, North Carolina. Her parents were Colonel Charles Frederick Fisher and his wife, the former Elizabeth Clarissa Caldwell. She was a cousin of Elizabeth Brownrigg Henderson Cotten and Archibald Henderson. Her mother had converted to Catholicism and raised Frances in that faith; her father was an Episcopalian. Colonel Fisher was killed in the beginning of the American Civil War at the battle of Manassas. Frances remained loyal to Confederate ideals all her life. The Fisher family was rich and lived at the northwest corner of Fulton and Innes streets in Salisbury, but lost much of its money due to the war. Her mother died while Frances was a toddler, orphaning her and younger siblings, twin boy and girl, who were then raised by a Catholic maiden aunt, her father's sister, Christine Fisher. As a child of three or four, before she had learned to write, Frances liked to tell long, fanciful stories, which she persuaded her aunt to transcribe.

She received her early instruction from aunt Christine. Fisher was sent to school at what was called St. Mary's College, a girls' school now known as Saint Mary's School in Raleigh, North Carolina. But her education was completed under the instruction of her aunt.

== Career ==
Fisher took her pen name, Christian Reid, from Christian, a family name on her mother's side, and Reid on her father's. Her family disliked it. Appletons' Journal accepted her first article under this pen name, and sent her a check to "Christian Reid" for US$50. Fisher was in a quandary as to how to cash the check and sought advice from her lawyer. He advised her to make it payable to him to avoid detection. Later, a member of the Appleton's firm wished to see the author Christian Reid while passing through North Carolina, but could not discover such a person in Salisbury. He questioned the postmaster, who said probably Mr. Reid was related to the Fishers and had perhaps been visiting them, as his mail was sent there. Learning this, Fisher confided to the postmaster about her pseudonym.

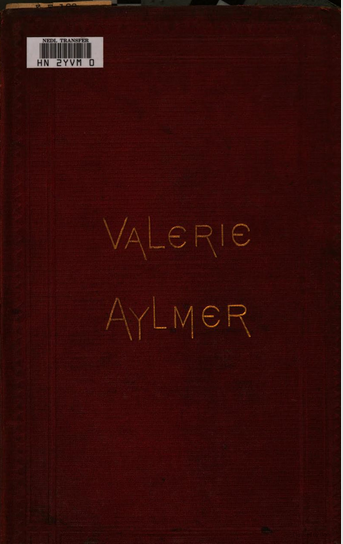
Valerie Aylmer

Fisher was writing stories regularly but it was not until the end of the war, when the family had lost its fortune, that she decided to write a novel to generate more income. The publication of Valerie Aylmer in 1870 was an instant success. A 1910 critic said that while it was faulty and immature; it possessed the charm of interest. Today it is noted for its portrayal of life and conduct in the South, as reflected through the temperament of a sentimental, young lady of distinguished birth.

The first period of Christian Reid's literary activities comprises the decade from 1869 to 1879. Most notable of the works of this period are the novels, Morton House (1871), A Daughter of Bohemia (1874), and A Question of Honor (1875). Her slight travel-sketch, entitled The Land of the Sky (1876) was highly popular, read by hundreds of thousands of people. This was considered the most notable commemoration of a section of the US ever published in North Carolina. After extending a line to Asheville around 1880, Southern Railway, used “The Land of the Sky" in its advertising for that route.

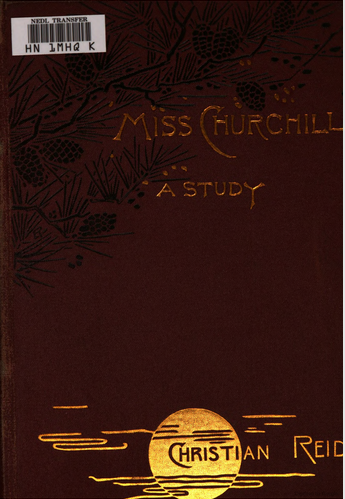
Miss Churchill

A distinct accession of power and increased mastery of style marked the works of Christian Reid's second period of literary activity, beginning after her return from Europe in 1880. Heart of Steel was a work approximating that of the standard English novelists, such as Anthony Trollope, in solidity of workmanship and concentration of purpose. Other works of this period were Armine, Roslyn's Fortune, The Child of Mary, Philip's Restitution, and Miss Churchill.

In 1887, Fisher married James Marquis Tiernan, of Maryland, and settled with him in Mexico, where he had extensive mining interests. This marked a third period in her career as a novelist. Her short story from this period, The Picture of Las Cruces, was highly popular. It had the distinction of being translated into French and being published in the Paris magazine, L'Illustration. The book was notable for the beauty of its envisagement of a semi-tropical land, the ideality of its poetic atmosphere, and the art displayed in the comparison and juxtaposition of the fragile romance of Mexico with the hardy realism of America. The Lady of Las Cruces, like most sequels, was less a natural consequence of the former story, than a hazardous attempt to crown the story with a "happy" (and popular) ending.

Other works of this period are: the travel-romance, The Land of the Sun (1894), one of her most interesting tales; as well as Carmela, Little Maid of Mexico, A Comedy of Elopement, A Woman of Fortune, Weighed in the Balance, and Carmen's Inheritance. In addition, she published two novels inspired by her travels in Santo Domingo: The Man of the Family and The Chase of an Heiress.

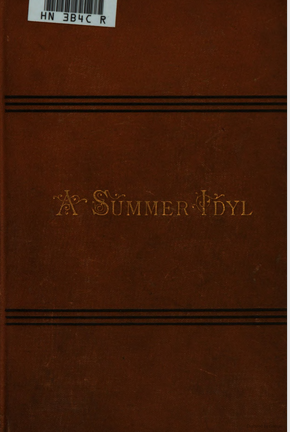
A Summer Idyl

Under the pen name of Christian Reid, she wrote at least two dramas, and numerous poems. The play Under the Southern Cross, was a stirring picture of the South during the American Civil War. It found enthusiastic houses in productions throughout the South. It expressed the South's views on the constitutional right of secession. The other play, entitled Princess Nadine, was published only as a novel. She rewrote it in that form in collaboration with Victor Mapes, and it was translated into Italian. Most of her books were published by the Appletons. A few that were more Roman Catholic in tone, such as Armine, were produced by the Catholic Publishing Company of New York. Other works included Mabel Lee, Ebb Tide, Nina's Atonement, A Gentle Belle, Hearts and Hands, After Many Days, Bonny Kate, A Summer Idyll, and A Child of Mary.

Some critics described Fisher's work as "a graceful, limpid style", "bland" and "sylvan romances". Others described it as being striking in its naturalness and truthfulness. One biography said "There is in her fiction an over-reliance on the picturesque that was popular in the years following the Civil War. Yet, her work stands apart from the many narratives of travel in Appalachia in its honest and realistic portrait of life in southern society."

== Personal life and legacy ==
Early in life, Fisher was received into the Catholic Church by Cardinal James Gibbons, then only Vicar Apostolic of North Carolina. She practised her religion zealously and helped raise money for construction of a Catholic church in her native town. Tiernan donated land for Sacred Heart Catholic Church, dedicated November 19, 1882. I

In 1909, Tiernan was awarded the Laetare Medal by the University of Notre Dame. At the time, she had published some 30 novels and numerous short stories, and was living with her aunt, Christine Fisher. It was the first time the medal was awarded to a Southerner.

She had married James Marquis Tiernan on December 29, 1887, and they moved to Mexico where he had mining interests. (He died January 1898.) At first the widowed Fisher Tiernan continued to live in New York, but decided to return to Salisbury, where she lived in her family house.

Tiernan died March 24, 1920, in Salisbury. She is buried at Chestnut Hill Cemetery in the Fisher family plot. Because a fire destroyed some cemetery records in the 1930s, it is not certain which family member is buried where. In 2006, the entire family plot was enclosed by a brick wall, with materials and labor donated by the owners of Taylor Clay Products. A pink granite bench was added and a granite cross was restored.

The United Daughters of the Confederacy erected a monument to Fisher Tiernan in 1939 on West Innes Street in Salisbury. It was moved in 1955 and again in 1983, this time to the site of the Rowan Public Library. Fisher had donated money for the Confederate Monument in Salisbury partly from the money she made from The Land of the Sky.

== Selected works ==
- A new Enoch Arden, n.d.
- The land of the sun: vistas mexicanas
- Gloria victis
- 1870-78, Short stories
- 1873, Carmen's inheritance
- 1873, Nina's atonement: a story in six chapters
- 1875, The story of a conspiracy
- 1877, The mountain-region of North Carolina
- 1877, A fairlyland of science
- 1878, Striking the Flag! or, Valerie Aylmer. A Novel.
- 1884, Armine
- 1887, His victory
- 1885, A child of Mary
- 1888, Grace Morton; or, The inheritance, a Catholic tale
- 1890, Philip's Restitution.
- 1890, A cast for fortune : a story of Mexican life
- 1891, A gentle belle. A novel.
- 1891, Carmela
- 1893, A little maid of Arcady
- 1893, A comedy of elopement
- 1893, Hearts and hands. A story in sixteen chapters
- 1894, Le tableau de Las Cruces: roman
- 1894, Kartina Vali︠a︡sket︠s︡a [sic]
- 1894, The land of the sun: vistas mexicanas
- 1895, Mabel Lee. A novel.
- 1895, A summer idyl
- 1895, Obraz w Las Cruces
- 1895, The lady of Las Cruces
- 1878, Bonny Kate : a novel
- 1896, A woman of fortune
- 1897, Fairy gold
- 1898, The chase of an heiress
- 1899, Ebb-tide, and other stories
- 1900, To the Confederate veterans, who so nobly did their duty during the late unpleasantness between the states ...
- 1900, Under the southern cross. A war drama in four acts.
- 1900, Miss Churchill; a study.
- 190?, Philip's restitution
- 1873, Nina's atonement : and other stories
- 1907, Véra's charge
- 1907, Princess Nadine
- 1909, The coin of sacrifice
- 1909, Weighed in the balance
- 1911, Cords of nature and In Miss Felicia's garden
- 1910, Heart of steel; a novel
- 1911, The light of the vision
- 1911, The Wargrave trust
- 1914, The testing of Isabel
- 1914, A Far-away Princess
- 1915, Noël : a Christmas story
- 1920, The daughter of a star
- 1903, A daughter of the Sierra
