= Mary Ferrand Henderson =

American political activist

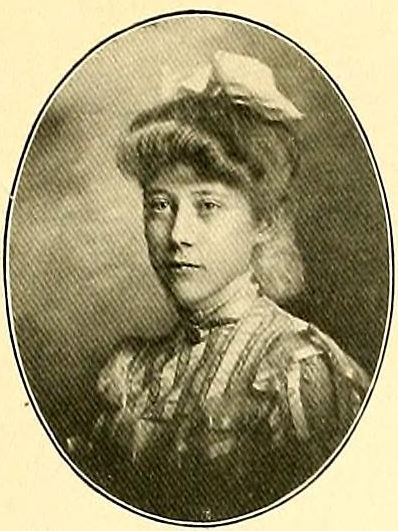
- Henderson in 1903.
- Born: October 13, 1887; Salisbury, North Carolina, U.S.
- Died: July 5, 1965 (aged 77); Chapel Hill, North Carolina, U.S.
- Education: St. Mary's School; University of North Carolina
- Occupation: political activist
- Political party: Democratic
- Parent(s): John S. Henderson (father); Elizabeth Brownrigg Cain (mother)
- Relatives: Archibald Henderson (brother); Elizabeth Henderson (sister)

Mary Ferrand Henderson (October 13, 1887 – July 4, 1965) was an American suffragist and politician. She was the first woman to serve as the vice chair of the North Carolina Democratic Party's executive committee and the first woman to serve on the University of North Carolina's alumni council.

== Early life and education ==
Henderson was born on October 13, 1887, in Salisbury, North Carolina. She was one of seven children of U.S. Congressman John Steele Henderson and Elizabeth Cain Henderson. She was the sister of Elizabeth Brownrigg Henderson Cotten and Archibald Henderson. She grew up in Salisbury, North Carolina.

Henderson was educated at Saint Mary's School in Raleigh, graduating in 1903. She studied law at the University of North Carolina.

== Career ==
Henderson was a committed suffragist and member of the North Carolina Democratic Party. She served as the first legislative chairwoman of the Equal Suffrage League of North Carolina. In 1920, she was appointed as the vice-chairwoman of the Democratic Party in Rowan County and, in 1922, she was appointed as the first woman to serve as the first vice-chair of the North Carolina Democratic Party's executive committee.

She was also the first woman that served on the University of North Carolina's alumni council.

== Personal life ==
Henderson was a member of the Daughters of the American Revolution, the United Daughters of the Confederacy, the Young Women's Christian Association, and the Woman's Club.

She was a member of the Episcopal Church.

She died on July 4, 1965, in Chapel Hill, North Carolina.
