= Bob Jones (Grand Dragon) =

American political activist (1929–1989)

James Robertson "Bob" Jones (July 26, 1929 – April 16, 1989) was an American white supremacist political activist who was active in the Ku Klux Klan in the 1950s and 1960s. He was Grand Dragon of the North Carolina Knights of the Ku Klux Klan from 1963 until 1969, when he was sent to prison for contempt of Congress.

== Early life ==
Jones was born on July 26, 1929, in Salisbury, North Carolina. His father was a railroad worker and had been a member of the Ku Klux Klan, an American white supremacist organization, in the 1920s. His mother was in the Klan's Ladies Auxiliary.

After dropping out of high school, Jones enlisted in the United States Navy. He was discharged after refusing to salute a black officer. He subsequently worked in various jobs, including as a bricklayer and salesman for lightning rods.

== Klan leadership ==
Jones joined the U.S. Klans organization in 1954, but later quit and joined the rival United Klans of America. In August 1963, Jones was elected as the Grand Dragon of the North Carolina state chapter of the United Klans of America. By 1965, the chapter claimed to have 12,000 members, the largest membership of any state Klan chapter.

On October 20, 1965, Jones was summoned before the House Un-American Activities Committee as part of its investigation of Klan activity. He was questioned about Klan activities and alleged financial fraud in his operation of the Klan chapter. He declined to answer or provide Klan records that had been subpoenaed. The House of Representatives voted to cite him for contempt of Congress. He was indicted, pleaded guilty, and was sentenced to a year in prison in March 1969. He was released from prison in January 1970. In his absence, the North Carolina Klan had fragmented into multiple groups. Six hundred members remained in his chapter. Jones did not agree with decisions made by the new leadership, and he ceased to be active in the Klan.

== Later life ==
After his release from prison, Jones returned to working as a lightning rod salesman, then later worked as a security guard. Jones died on April 16, 1989.
