= Rowan Mall =

Former shopping mall in Salisbury, North Carolina

- Location: Salisbury, North Carolina, United States
- Coordinates: 35.6543°N 80.4602°W
- Opened: October 25, 1967
- Closed: 1995
- Demolished: 1996
- Developer: Rowan Mall Shopping Center Inc.
- Num. of anchor tenants: 3 (2 junior anchors)
- Floor area: 108,000 sq ft (10,000 m^{2})
- Floors: 1

Rowan Mall was a shopping mall in Salisbury, North Carolina, United States. It was anchored by Roses. It opened in 1967, closed in 1995, and was demolished in 1996.

== History ==
=== 1960s ===
Rowan Mall opened its doors by a ribbon cutting ceremony on October 25, 1967. It opened with 11 stores, being primarily anchored by Roses, with junior anchors Winn Dixie and Eckerd Drug. The Roses at the mall was roughly 60,000 square feet, the Eckerd Drug was 10,100 square feet, and the Winn Dixie was 13,300 square feet. Construction costs for the mall project were $1.5 million. The mall was located at the intersection of i85 and E. Innes Street, right across the street from Towne Mall. Mall developer Rowan Mall Shopping Center Inc. was based out of Columbia, South Carolina.

Management duties for the mall were transferred in June 1969 to Headen Realty Co., who specialized in apartment management. This would be their first venture into commercial retail environments.

=== 1970s ===
The mall would sell to a group of 5 Businessmen from Greensboro, Raleigh and Burlington, North Carolina in June 1976. The 108,000 square foot mall was purchased for a price of more than $1.7 million, and had 10 tenants at the time of the sale.

=== 1980s ===
In March 1981, Roses would undergo a small renovation that involved the addition of a garden center on the outside, and the reconfiguring of the interior layout of the store.

In December 1981, the mall would sell to I. R. E Real Estate Fund Ltd., based out of Florida, for an estimated $2.2 million.

On November 19, 1985, the then famous Budweiser Clydesdales made a display at the Rowan Mall. They were on display from 1pm to 5pm.

On January 25, 1989, Winn-Dixie at Rowan Mall would close.

=== 1990s ===
On March 29, 1994, 2 men and 1 female entered a gun shop located inside of the mall. One of the men while the owner was opening a cabinet, smashed a glass display with his own firearm. The other man pulled out a .308 pistol and shot the shop keeper, and all 3 ran off. Nothing was actually stolen, and the shopkeeper ended up receiving medical treatment at Rowan Memorial Hospital.

The final blow to the mall would come when Roses announced it would close its Rowan Mall store as part of its Chapter 11 bankruptcy. Liquidation started in January 1994 and would conclude in roughly 2 to 3 months.

The mall would soon after close, and by April 1996, it was being demolished for the Innes Street Market, a 400,000 square foot power center.
