= Elizabeth Brownrigg Henderson Cotten =

American librarian and suffragist

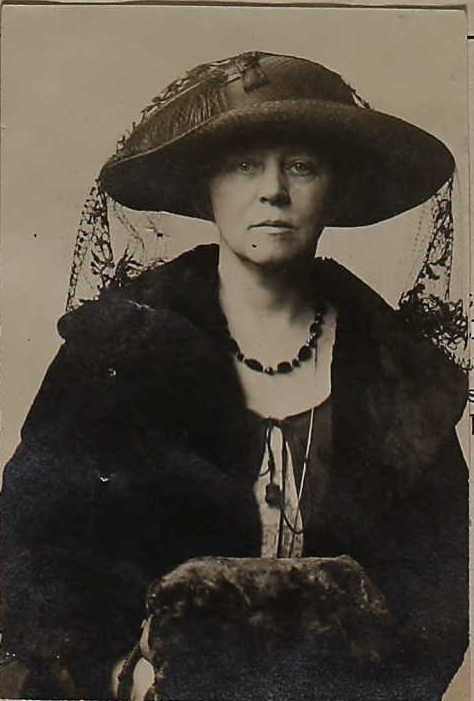
- Cotten in 1922
- Born: Elizabeth Brownrigg Henderson; August 4, 1875; Salisbury, North Carolina, U.S.
- Died: February 3, 1975 (aged 99); Chapel Hill, North Carolina, U.S.
- Resting place: Arlington National Cemetery
- Education: St. Mary's Junior College
- Occupations: philanthropist, socialite, activist, librarian
- Political party: Democratic
- Spouse: Lyman A. Cotten
- Children: 2
- Parent(s): John S. Henderson (father); Elizabeth Brownrigg Cain (mother)
- Relatives: Archibald Henderson (brother); Mary Henderson (sister); Christian Reid (cousin)

Elizabeth Brownrigg "Bessie" Henderson Cotten (August 4, 1875 – February 3, 1975) was an American librarian, socialite, philanthropist, and women's rights activist. She served as the first curator of the Southern Historical Collection at the University of North Carolina at Chapel Hill. Cotten was an active member of the Democratic Party and campaigned for Al Smith during the 1928 United States presidential election. She was a member of the League of Women Voters, the Daughters of the American Revolution, and the United Daughters of the Confederacy.

== Early life and family ==
Cotten was born Elizabeth Brownrigg Henderson on August 4, 1875, in Salisbury, North Carolina, to Congressman John Steele Henderson and Elizabeth Brownrigg Cain Henderson. Her brother was the mathematician Archibald Henderson and her sister was the suffragist Mary Ferrand Henderson. She was a direct descendant of the Scottish colonist Thomas Henderson, who emigrated from Dumfries and settled in Jamestown, Virginia in 1612.

She was educated at a private school in Salisbury and graduated with honors from St. Mary's Junior College in Raleigh.

== Volunteerism and activism ==
Cotten was an outspoken member of the United Daughters of the Confederacy and raised money to provide support for Confederate veterans. She spoke before the North Carolina General Assembly in 1901 and secured increased funding for Civil War pensions for Confederate veterans. Her cousin, Christian Reid, made her the main character in the play Under the Southern Cross and in the novel Princess Nadine. She read the play before audiences throughout North Carolina in an effort to raise funds for the United Daughters of the Confederacy. She was also an active member of the Daughters of the American Revolution, serving for two terms as a chapter regent.

While her husband served as chief of staff to Admiral Mark Lambert Bristol, Cotten performed relief work for Russian refugees. When her husband was stationed in Japan, Cotten founded the Woman's Club of Tokyo and served as its first president. She was a prominent socialite and hostess.

During the Great Influenza epidemic in 1918, Cotten supervised volunteer nursing unites and diet kitchens. She was a leader in the Woman's Auxiliary of Trinity Cathedral, established a library and a nursing association and supported St. Luke's Hospital, serving as chairwoman of the hospital committee for the Episcopal Diocese of North Carolina in 1930.

During World War I, Cotten helped with Liberty Loan drives and supervised Red Cross efforts. She served as chairwoman of the Eighth Congressional District's Council of National Defense and organized the local Navy League.

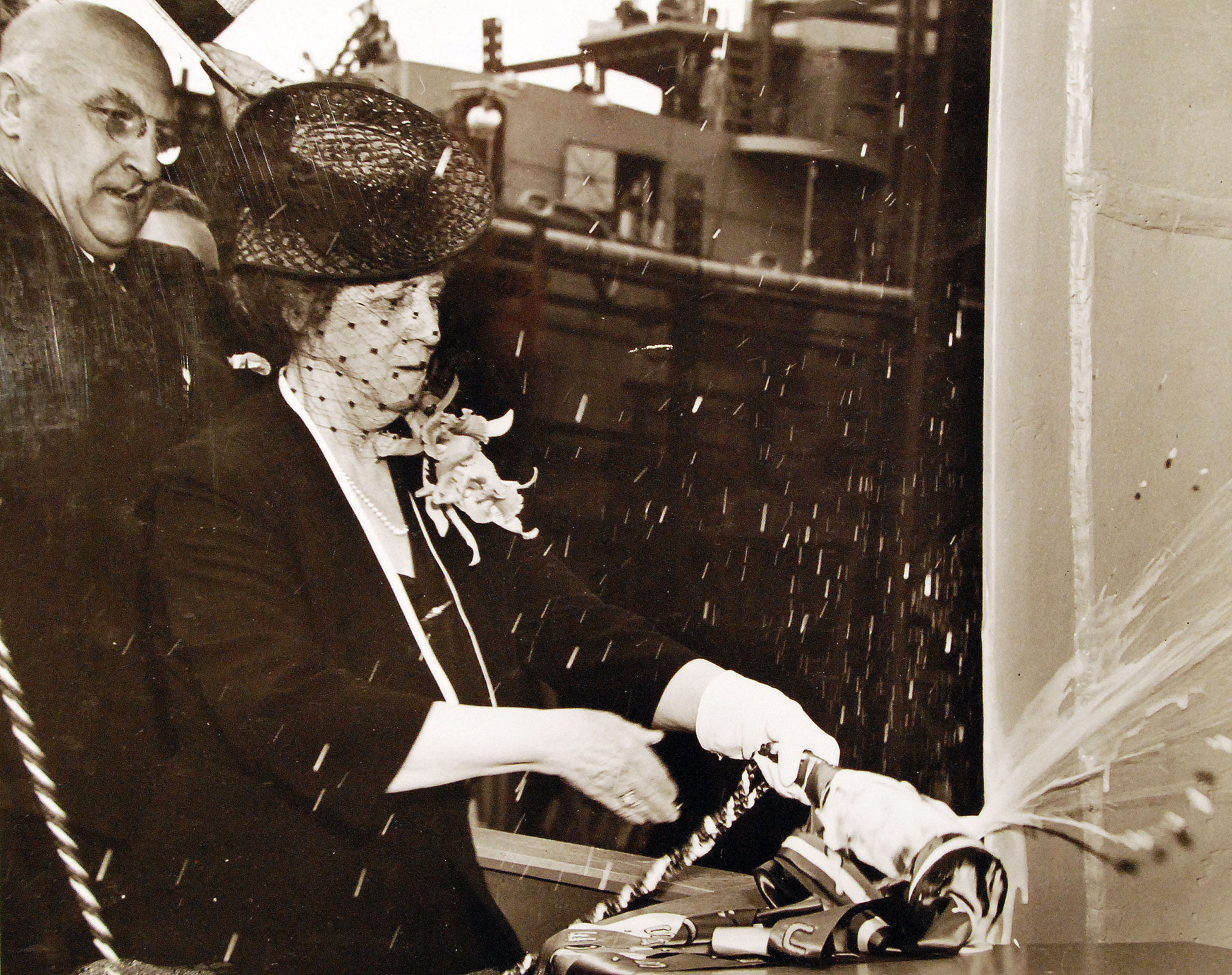
Cotten christens the USS Cotten in Kearny, New Jersey on June 12, 1943.

Cotten was a dedicated member of the North Carolina Democratic Party and served as vice-chairwoman of the Eight Congressional District's party organization in 1928. She campaigned for Al Smith during the 1928 United States presidential election and was a member of the North Carolina Equal Suffrage League and the League of Women Voters.

== Library career ==
In 1932, Cotten was hired as the assistant to Joseph Grégoire de Roulhac Hamilton and helped establish the Southern Historical Collection at the University of North Carolina at Chapel Hill, serving as its first curator. Cotten served as secretary of Friends of the Library and secured thousands of historical records and memorabilia for the archives. From 1935 to 1939, she served as production supervisor of the Works Progress Administration and later authored John Paul Jones-Willie Jones Tradition and co-edited Old Homes and Gardens of North Carolina.

== Personal life and death ==
While her father was serving in the United States Congress, Cotten frequently visited the White House and was a guest of President Grover Cleveland and First Lady Frances Cleveland.

She married Captain Lyman Atkinson Cotten, an officer in the United States Navy, on July 16, 1908. They had two sons, Lyman Atkinson Cotten Jr. and John Henderson Cotten. Her husband served as the Chief of Staff of the American Naval Representatives, which brought the family to China, Japan, and Turkey. During this time, Cotten was presented at royal courts in Europe and entertained foreign dignitaries, military leaders, and missionaries.

Following her husband's death in 1926, Cotten moved to Chapel Hill, North Carolina. Shed died in Chapel Hill on February 3, 1975, and her funeral was held the following day at Chapel of the Cross. She was buried next to her husband in Arlington National Cemetery.
