= Community Building (Salisbury, North Carolina) =

Historic courthouse in North Carolina, US

- U.S. National Register of Historic Places
- U.S. Historic district – Contributing property
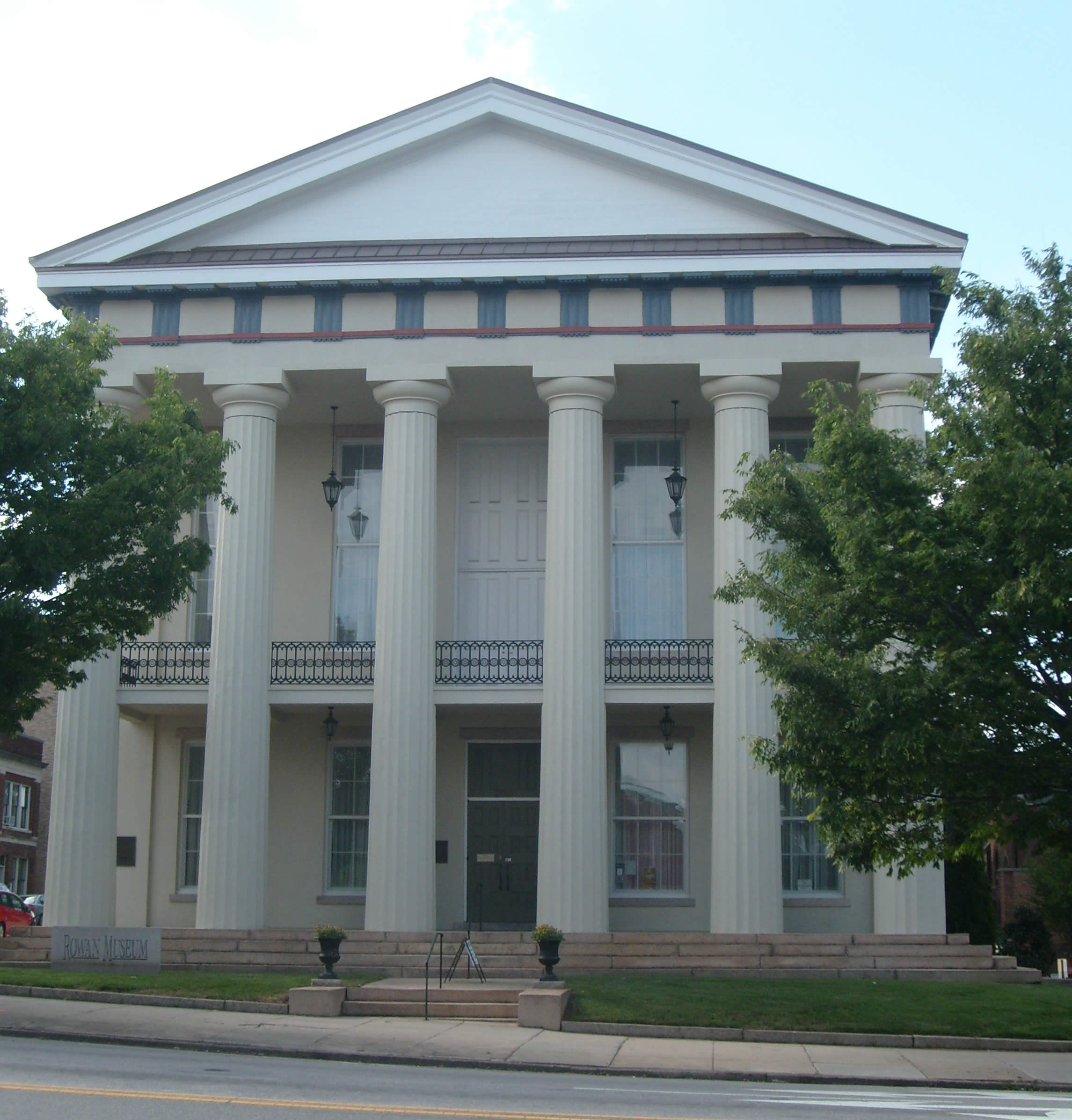
- Community Building, April 2012

- Location within North Carolina Location within the United States
- Location: 200 N. Main St., Salisbury, North Carolina
- Coordinates: 35°40′6″N 80°28′7″W
- Area: 0.7 acres (0.28 ha)
- Built: 1854-1857
- Architect: Conrad & Williams
- Architectural style: Classical Revival
- NRHP reference No.: 70000468
- Added to NRHP: March 5, 1970

The Community Building, originally built as the Rowan County Courthouse, is a historic building located at Salisbury, Rowan County, North Carolina. It was built between 1854 and 1857, and is a two-story, Classical Revival, stuccoed brick building on a granite foundation. It measures 50 feet wide and 85 feet long and features a pedimented portico supported by six Doric order columns. The portico includes a cast iron balcony and the building is distinguished by tall windows. A new Rowan County Courthouse was built in 1914, and the building used as a community center. The building is operated by the Rowan Museum.

It was listed on the National Register of Historic Places in 1970. It is located in the Salisbury Historic District.
