= Sacred Heart Catholic Church (Salisbury, North Carolina) =

Coordinates: 35.7087°N 80.5077°W

Sacred Heart Roman Catholic Church
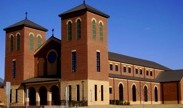

Religion
- Affiliation: Roman Catholic Church
- Diocese: Roman Catholic Diocese of Charlotte
- Leadership: Bishop Michael Thomas Martin OFM Conv.

Location
- Location: Salisbury, North Carolina, United States
- Interactive map of Sacred Heart Roman Catholic Church

Sacred Heart Catholic Church is a Roman Catholic church on Lumen Christi Lane in Salisbury, North Carolina, United States. The building cost $9.4 million, has 12,083 square feet (1,122.5 m^{2}) and measures 60 by 170 feet (52 m), seating 760, on 107 acres (0.43 km^{2}) of land. The church held a dedication mass on December 19, 2009. Sacred Heart has about 1000 registered families.

== History ==
The Roueche family came to Salisbury in 1838 and were believed to be the first Catholics in the area. The wooden first building, dedicated in 1882, by Bishop Northrup of Charleston, South Carolina, went up on land at North Fulton and Council Streets donated by Frances Christine Fisher, author Christian Reid. The church was part of Belmont Abbey from 1885 to 1941 and served by the Benedictine order. In 1910, the Sisters of Mercy from Belmont, North Carolina, built a school which became a parish school in 1942 and was replaced in August 2009 by a new building on Lumen Christi Lane, served by the Dominican Sisters of St. Catherine of Siena. Sacred Heart School serves children through the eighth grade.

A pink granite building was dedicated by Bishop Eugene McGuinness of Raleigh in 1940. From 1941 until the Charlotte diocese was formed in 1972, Sacred Heart was under the Raleigh Diocese.

Our Lady of Victory began in 1942 as an African-American congregation, which later merged with Sacred Heart.

A Hispanic ministry started in 1995, and Spanish language masses began once the numbers grew sufficiently to offer them.

Sacred Heart needed a larger building and considered a site on Old Mocksville Road, but the church traded parcels of land and decided to locate near Isenberg school. Gray Stout of Stout Studio Architecture had toured American and European churches and looked at books and church rules to determine the proper design for a church. The new building dedicated December 19, 2009 has the shape of a cross. J.F. Schultze Construction built the new building. James McCreary of Washington, D.C. designed the columns, arches and interior trim in the sanctuary/altar area. Members face east during Mass. Nine of the stained glass windows came from the old church, and the marble high altar and side altars, 75 years old, came from Our Lady Help of Christians in Chicago, while pews and Stations of the Cross came from Queen of Peace in Buffalo, New York. Confessionals came from St. Stanislaus Kostka in Baltimore. Rock faces and tumbled handmade bricks were made by members and were donated by Taylor Clay, also a member. Most Reverend Peter J. Jurgis, JCD, Bishop of Charlotte, dedicated the building on December 19, 2009.

On March 11, 2012, The Refuge, a Concord, North Carolina–based church, moved its Salisbury services from a movie theater into the former Sacred Heart building after doing some work. The Refuge was leasing the building but considered buying it.

On April 7, 2013, Sacred Heart became one of ten North Carolina churches to offer Latin Mass.

In June 2016, Salisbury City Council voted to rezone the former church's property for a wedding venue called The Abbey which will include retail. In November, the city planning board approved an amendment that would let The Refuge continue using the site.
