= Michael Braun House =

Historic house in North Carolina, United States

- U.S. National Register of Historic Places
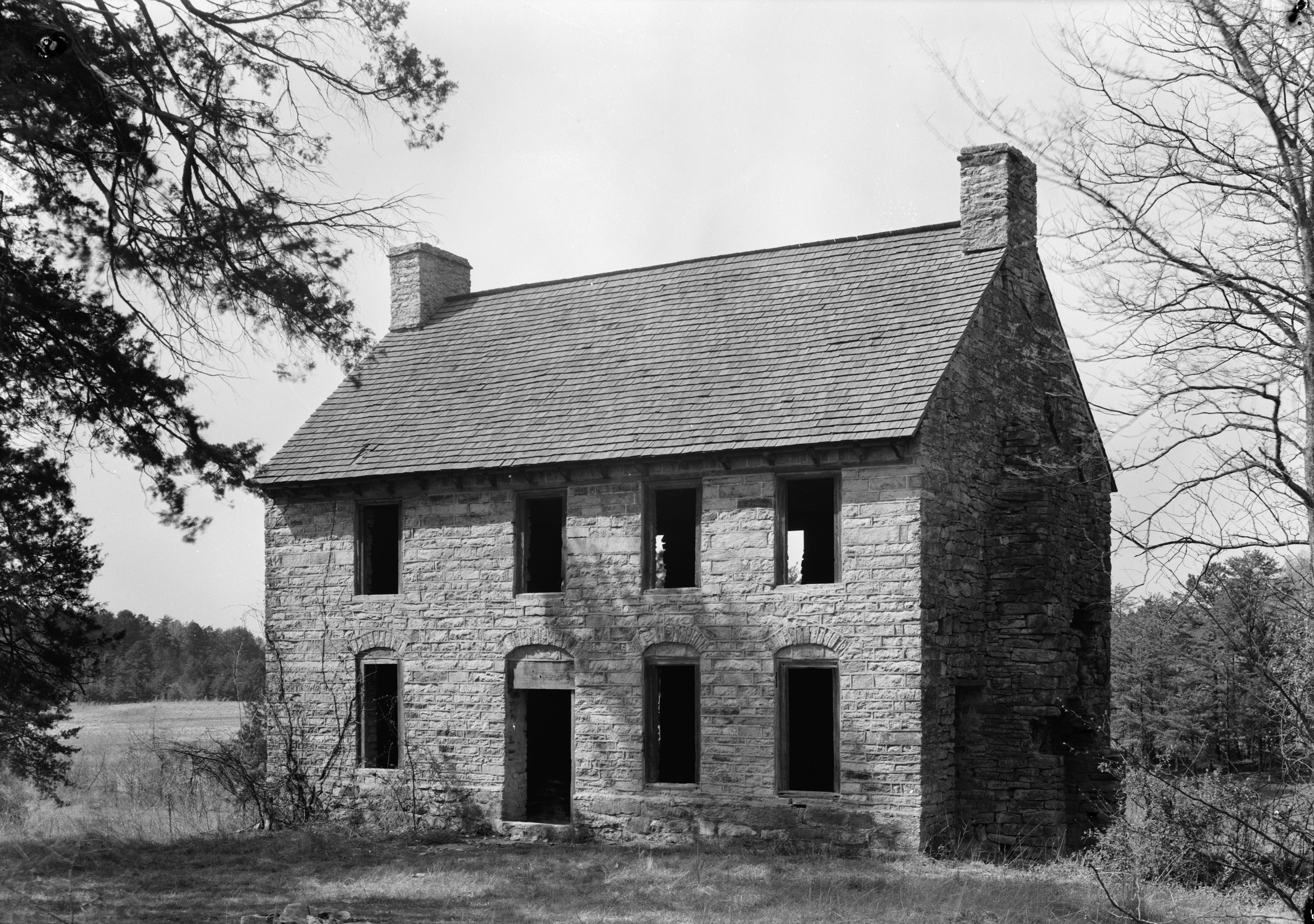
- Michael Braun House, HABS Photo, 1940

- Location within North Carolina Location within the United States
- Location: NW of Granite Quarry on SR 2308 off U.S. 52, near Granite Quarry, North Carolina
- Coordinates: 35°37′20″N 80°26′28″W
- Area: 2 acres (0.81 ha)
- Built: 1766
- NRHP reference No.: 71000618
- Added to NRHP: 28 September 1971

The Michael Braun House (also known as the Old Stone House) is a historic Colonial stone house located near Granite Quarry, Rowan County, North Carolina, United States. It is the oldest known dwelling in Rowan County and one of the oldest in the Piedmont region of North Carolina.

== Description and history ==
The Michael Braun House was built over seven years on 274 acres that Braun purchased after moving to the area in the late 1750s. 3500 tons of granite came from a quarry in the area. The house is a two-story four-bay-wide stone house with two end chimneys and one-story frame kitchen wing on east side. A notable feature of the restored house is a pent roof on north and west sides. It is an example of early German Colonial architecture typical of German settlements in Pennsylvania and the country of origin, Germany.

The house was abandoned for about 50 years and in bad shape when the Rowan Museum purchased it in 1959. After restoration it became a tourist attraction in 1966. It was listed on the National Register of Historic Places on September 28, 1971. Currently it is open for visitation during the months of April through November.
