= Rowan Community Center =

Coordinates: 35.6921°N 80.5149°W

Rowan Community Center is a former shopping mall in Salisbury, North Carolina. It is owned by Rowan County, North Carolina.

Built starting in 1986 at Jake Alexander Boulevard and Statesville Boulevard, Salisbury Mall appeared to be in a good place. However, critics said the mall should have been built closer to Interstate 85. In August 2013, J. C. Penney, an original anchor, closed its store, and Belk moved to another shopping center later that year. Big Lots had already moved to a new location, and much of the mall was empty.

Rowan County bought Salisbury Mall in December 2013 for $3.4 million because of a need for additional office space. The mall was renamed West End Plaza.

By September 2014, with other stores in the mall closing, Books-A-Million closed.

A 2015 master plan called for moving social services and the health department into the former mall, and the sheriff and probation into their former space. Other possibilities were the library's history and genealogy room, and planning, building inspections and environmental departments. A conference center was also considered. The former J.C. Penney was used for events.

As of September 2017, the Board of Elections and Veterans Services had moved into West End Plaza. Renovating the former Penney's proved to be too expensive.

On July 1, 2019, Rowan County commissioners considered an $18.93 million plan by ADW Architects to improve the mall. This included $2.9 million to renovate a section of the mall for an agriculture center, $7.6 million for an events space, $5.1 million for exterior renovations and parking improvements, and $3.2 million for additional exterior work and traffic-related improvements such as roundabouts.

A ribbon cutting for the Rowan Community Center took place March 20, 2025. At that time, work was under way on a new health center and an agriculture center in the former mall.
