= Land of the Sky =

1876 novel by Christian Reid

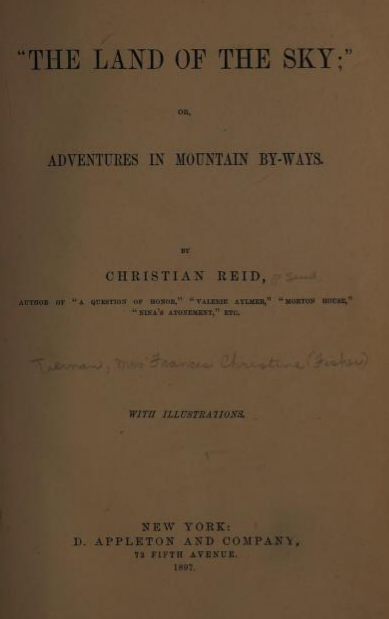
- Title page for The Land of the Sky, or, adventures in mountain by-ways (1897 edition)
- Author: Christian Reid
- Language: English
- Publisher: D. Appleton & Company
- Publication date: 1876
- Publication place: United States

The Land of the Sky, or, adventures in mountain by-ways (1876) is a novel by American author Frances Christine Fisher Tiernan, who published under the pseudonym Christian Reid. She published more than 50 novels, most notably this one.

The name refers to the Blue Ridge Mountains and Great Smoky Mountains in western North Carolina. The title of the book has come to be used as a nickname for North Carolina. More recently, it has been adopted by the city of Asheville, which lies between the Blue Ridge and Great Smoky mountains in the state.

== Editions ==
- New York, D. Appleton and Company, 1876. (1st ed.)
- Alexander, NC: Land of the Sky Books, 2001, ISBN 1-56664-177-2 (trade paper), ISBN 1-56664-178-0 (hc)
