= Archibald Henderson (professor) =

American professor of mathematics

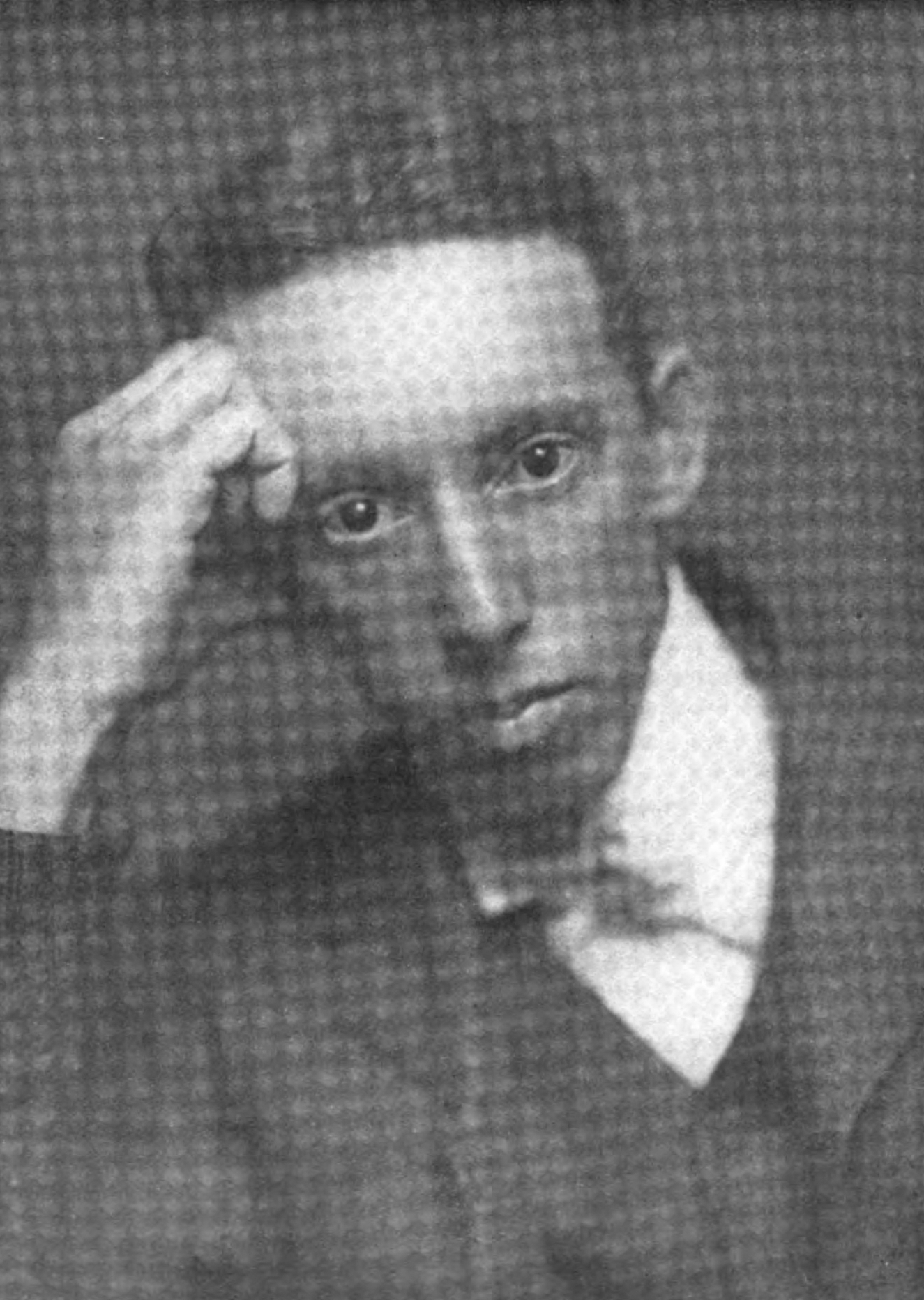
Henderson c. 1910

Archibald Henderson (July 17, 1877 – December 6, 1963) was an American professor of mathematics who wrote on a variety of subjects, including drama and history. He is well known for his friendship with George Bernard Shaw.

== Early life ==
He was born at Salisbury, North Carolina, the son of John S. Henderson and Elizabeth Brownrigg Cain. His sisters were Mary Ferrand Henderson and Elizabeth Brownrigg Henderson Cotten. He was educated at the University of North Carolina (A.B., 1898; Ph.D., 1902), where he was a member of Sigma Nu fraternity, and studied more at Chicago, Cambridge, and Berlin universities, and at the Sorbonne (Paris). After 1899 he taught at the University of North Carolina, becoming professor of pure mathematics in 1908.

== Bernard Shaw ==
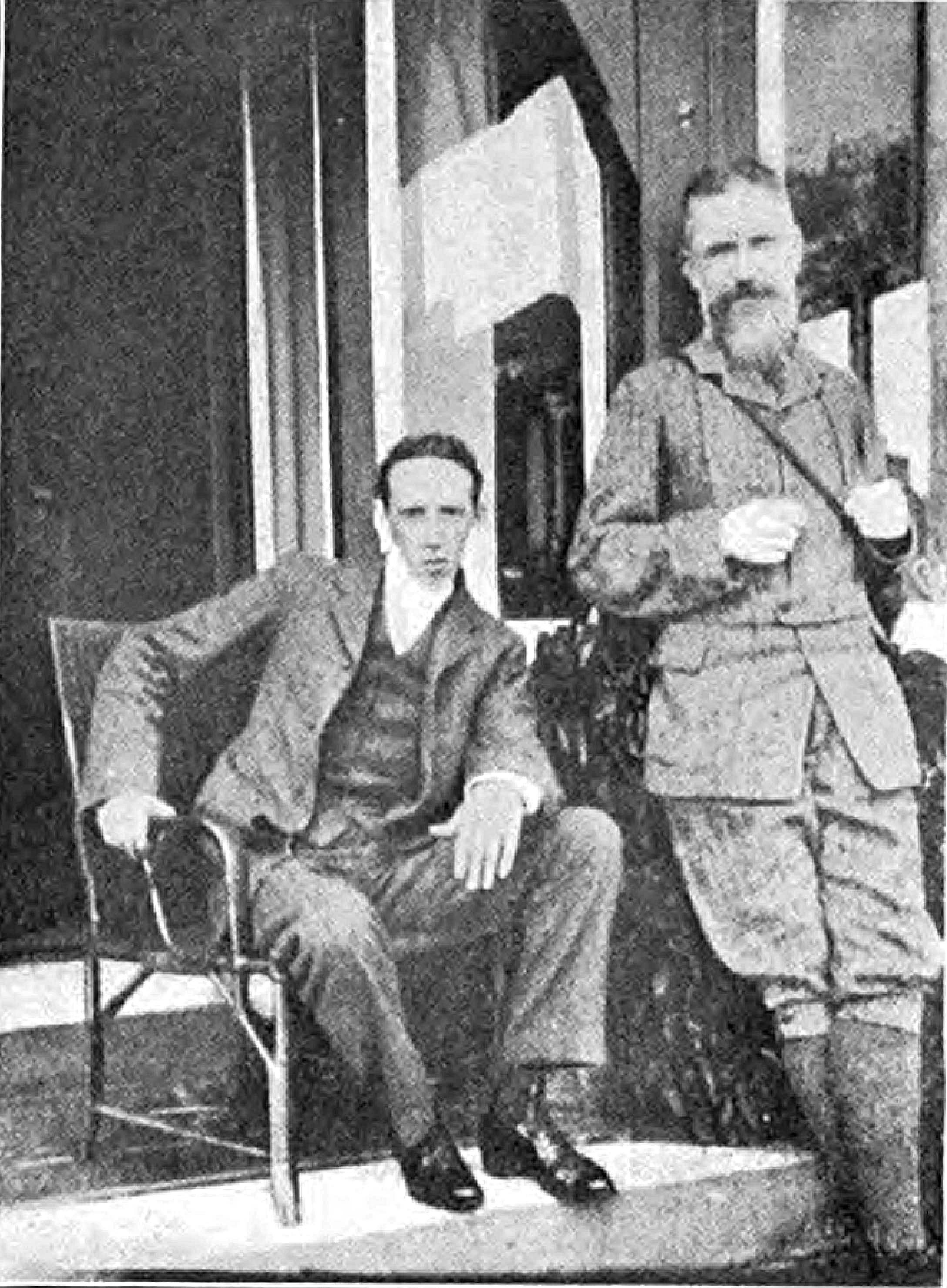
Henderson and G. Bernard Shaw, 1912

In 1903 in Chicago Henderson saw the first performance in the United States of Bernard Shaw's play You Never Can Tell. Henderson became so enthusiastic about the playwright and his personality that he determined to write Shaw's biography. After some communication between Shaw and Henderson, Henderson arrived in London in 1907 on the very same train carrying Mark Twain who was en route to Oxford to receive an honorary degree. Having established his relation with Shaw, Henderson went on to write three different versions of Shaw's biography covering Shaw's entire career up to the playwright's death in 1950, including several other miscellaneous works about Shaw. The Libraries at the University of North Carolina hold about 380 of Henderson's own writings on various topics, including an invaluable collection of 75 scrap books devoted to articles about Shaw.

== Works ==
His publications include:

- Lines on the Cubic Surface (1911)
- Interpreters of Life and the Modern Spirit (1911)
- Mark Twain (1911)
- George Bernard Shaw: His Life and Works (1911)
- George Bernard Shaw: Playboy and Prophet (1932)
- George Bernard Shaw: Man of the Century (1956)
- George Bernard Shaw: Table Talk of G.B.S. (1926)
- George Bernard Shaw: Is Bernard Shaw a Dramatist? (1929)
- Forerunners of the Republic (1913)
- The Life and Times of Richard Henderson (1913)
- European Dramatists (1913)
- The Changing Drama (1914)
