= Maxwell Chambers House =

United States national historic place

- U.S. National Register of Historic Places
- U.S. Historic district – Contributing property
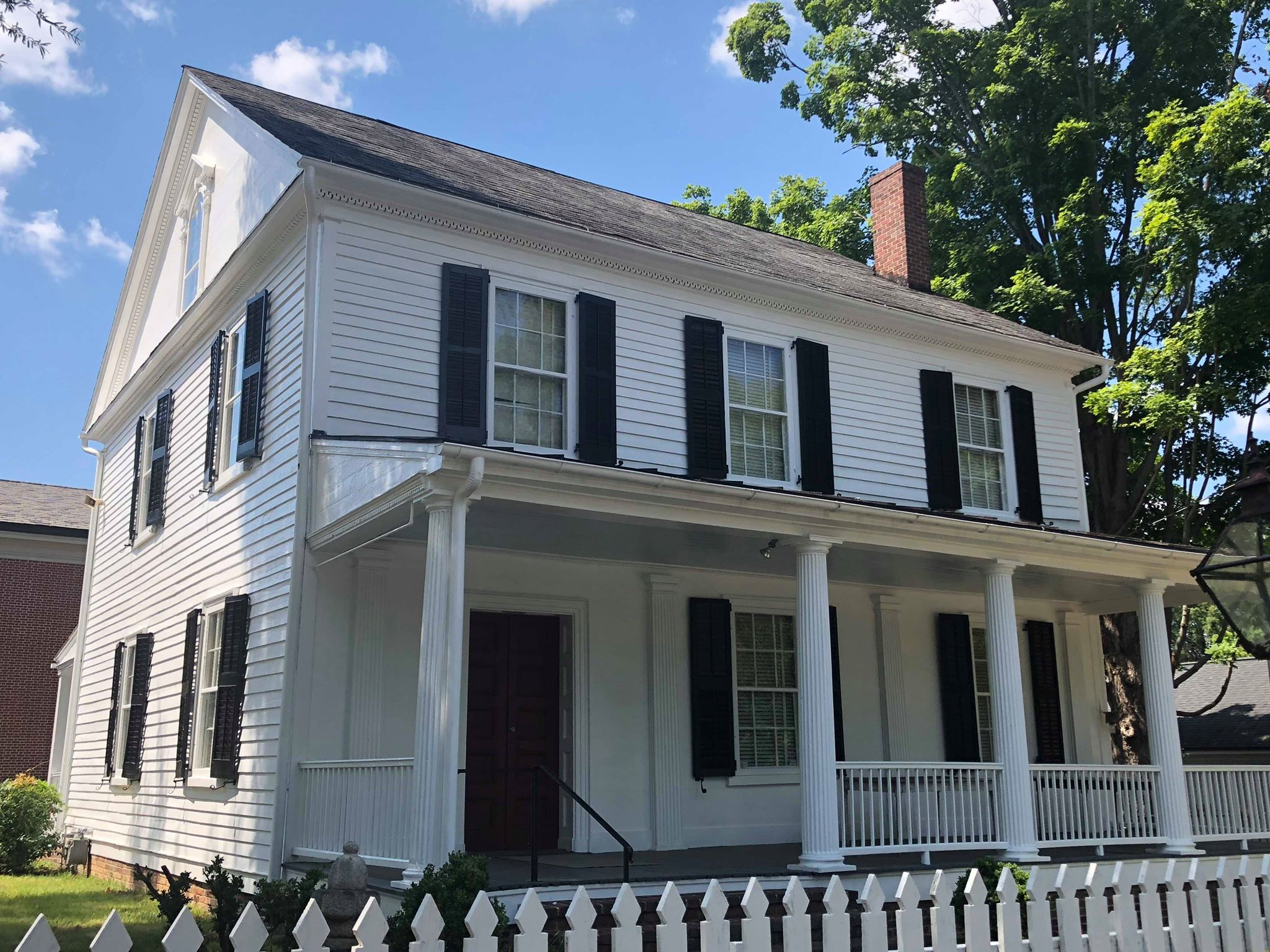
- Maxwell Chambers House. Ca. 1819. Federal. Salisbury, NC. West Square Local Historic District.

- Location within North Carolina Location within the United States
- Location: 116 S. Jackson St., Salisbury, North Carolina
- Coordinates: 35°40′09″N 80°28′20″W
- Area: 0.5 acres (0.20 ha)
- Built: c. 1814-1819
- Built by: Stirewalt, Jacob
- Architectural style: Federal
- NRHP reference No.: 72000992
- Added to NRHP: January 20, 1972

Maxwell Chambers House (also called Utzman-Chambers House) is a historic home located at Salisbury, Rowan County, North Carolina. It was built between 1814 and 1819, and is a two-story, three-bay, Federal-style frame townhouse. It has three interior end chimneys and a one-story full-width shed roofed front porch with Doric order columns.

It was listed on the National Register of Historic Places in 1972. It is located in the Salisbury Historic District.

Cabinetmaker Lewis Utzman bought the site in 1814 from Charles Fisher for $100 and sold it to Judge James Martin for $1026 in 1819. It is believed the house was built for Utzman between these two dates, possibly by Jacob Utzman, who may have been a relative.

The house became the Rowan County museum in the years 1953 to 1979 and was used for that purpose until the museum moved to the former courthouse in 2001. In August 2025, the Historic Salisbury Foundation said it was moving out of the Salisbury Depot, which was sold to the city, into the Utzman-Chambers House.

== Maxwell Chambers ==
It was the home of Maxwell Chambers (1780-1855), a slave owner, planter and manufacturer in Salisbury. He was also a representative from the Salisbury District in the North Carolina House of Commons in 1779, 1789, and 1790.
