= Cleveland Township, Rowan County, North Carolina =

Township in Rowan County, North Carolina

Coordinates: 35.7391225°N 80.6881718°W

Cleveland Township
- Township
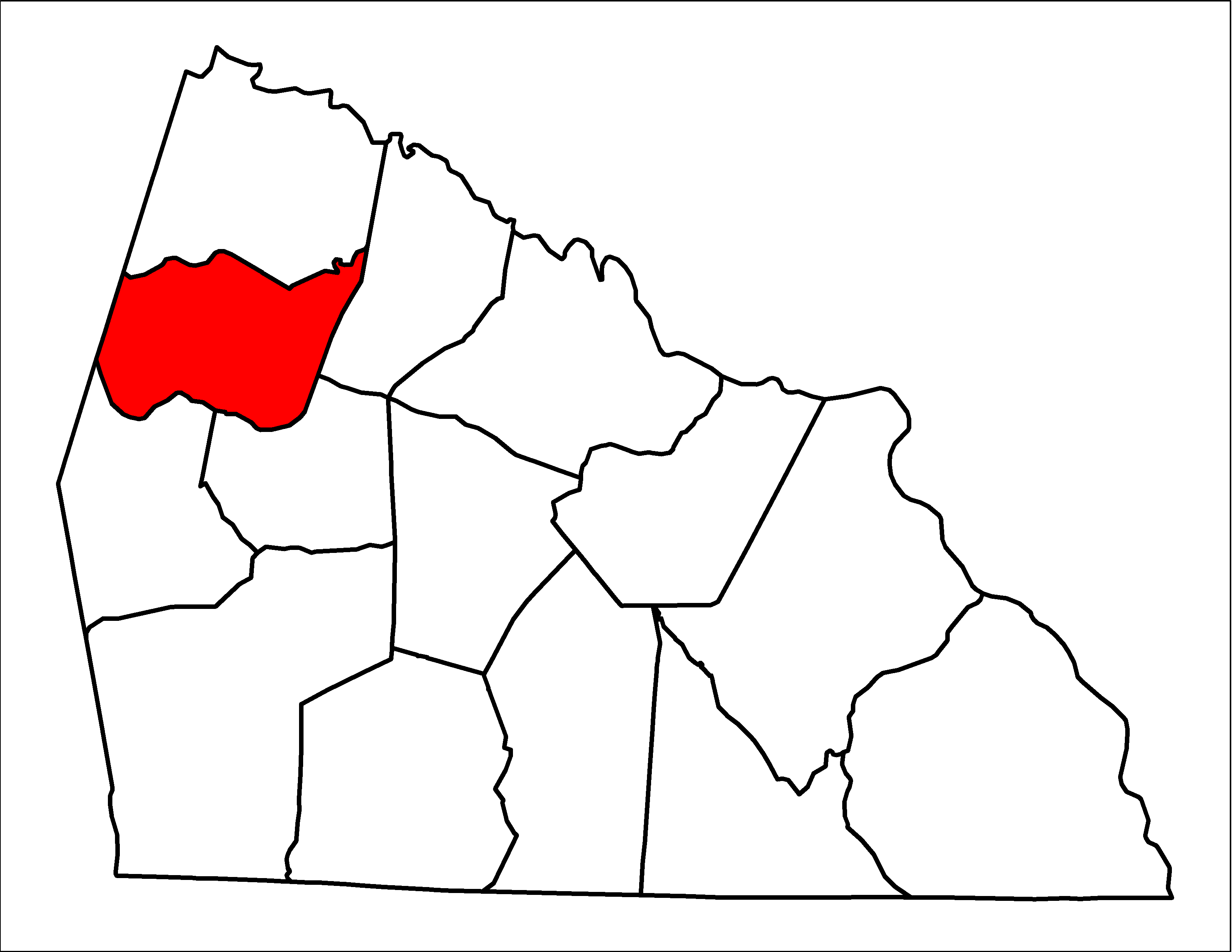
- Location of Cleveland Township in Rowan County

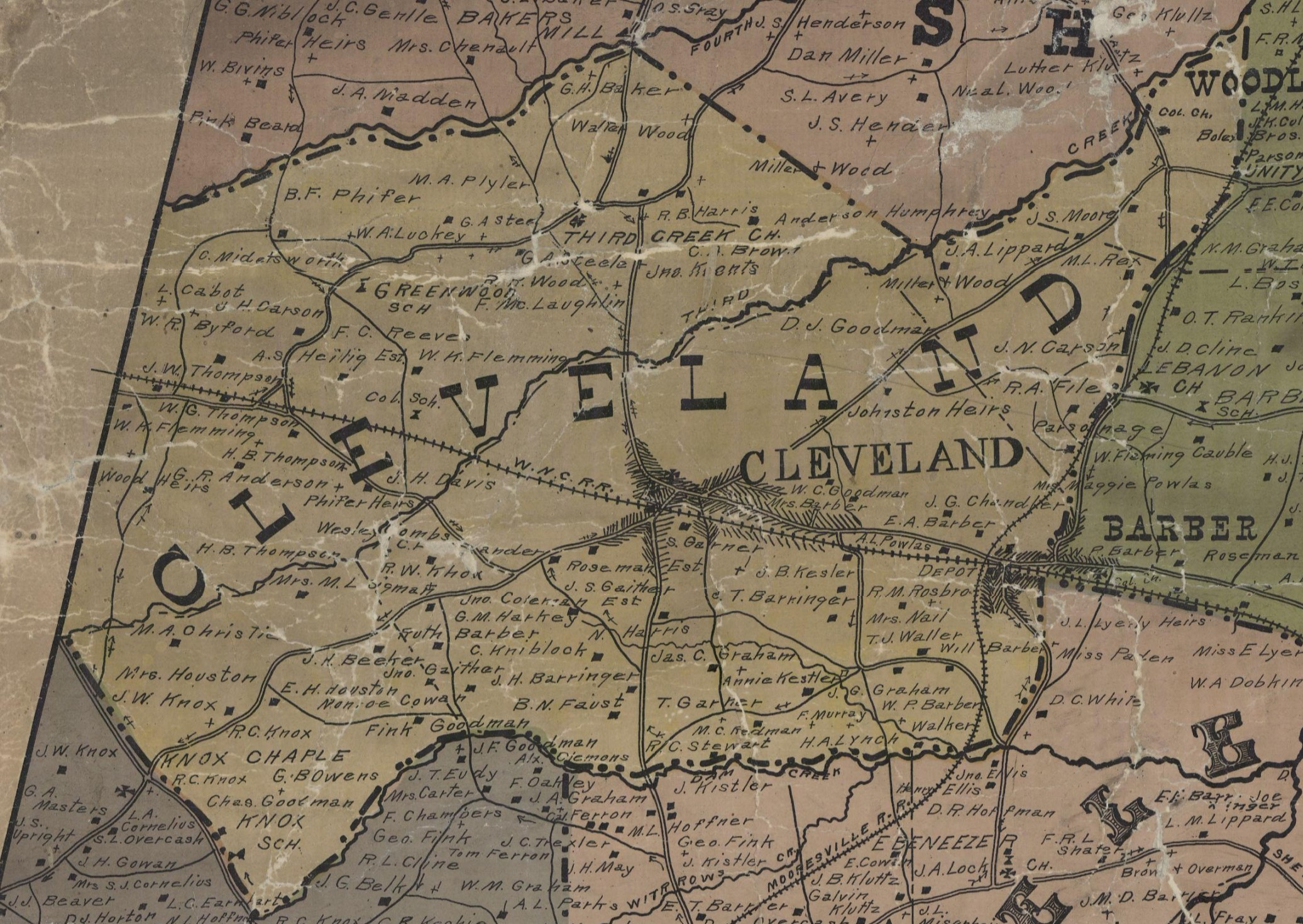
- Cleveland Township in 1903

- Location within North Carolina Location within the United States
- Country: United States
- State: North Carolina
- County: Rowan
- Established in: 1868

Government
  - Type: non-functioning county subdivision

Area
  - Total: 28.5 sq mi (73.8 km^{2})
- Time zone: UTC-5 (Eastern (EST))
  - Summer (DST): UTC-4 (EDT)

Cleveland Township is one of fourteen non-functioning county subdivisions (townships) in Rowan County, North Carolina that were established in 1868. The township had a population of 2,817 according to the 2010 census. The only incorporated municipality in Cleveland Township is the town of Cleveland. Residents are served by the Rowan–Salisbury School System and the township is home to Mt Ulla Elementary School.

== History ==
On 18 March 1831, the first post office in the general vicinity of present-day Cleveland was established with John Cowan the first postmaster. It was named Cowansville. On 7 January 1856, before the Western North Carolina (WNC) Railroad was built, the post office and thus the town in the vicinity of present-day Cleveland were renamed to Rowan Mills, getting this name from a large plantation nearby owned by Osborn Giles Foard (1820-1882), who was also the first Rowan Mills postmaster. After the construction of WNC Railroad, the railroad station was named Third Creek. The post office and town kept the name Rowan Mills until 25 February 1884, when the town was incorporated and renamed to Third Creek. On 2 March 1887, the townspeople, who were all Democrats except for three people, decided to rename the town to Cleveland, in honor of Grover Cleveland, the first Democratic president elected since before the Civil War. The first postmaster of both the Third Creek Post Office and the Cleveland Post Office was William L. Allison.

== Significant sites ==
The following significant sites are located within Cleveland Township:

- Barber Farm
- Knox Farm Historic District
- Knox School
- Knox-Johnstone House
- John Phifer Farm
- Third Creek Presbyterian Church and Cemetery
- R.A. Clement School
- Christ Episcopal Church
- Thompson Veneer Company, built in 1899

== Adjacent townships ==
- Chambersburg, Iredell County – west
- Cool Springs, Iredell County – northwest
- Mount Ulla – south
- Scotch Irish – north
- Steele – southeast
- Unity – east
