= Steele Township, Rowan County, North Carolina =

Township in Rowan County, North Carolina

Coordinates: 35.6706915°N 80.6437906°W

Steele Township
- Township
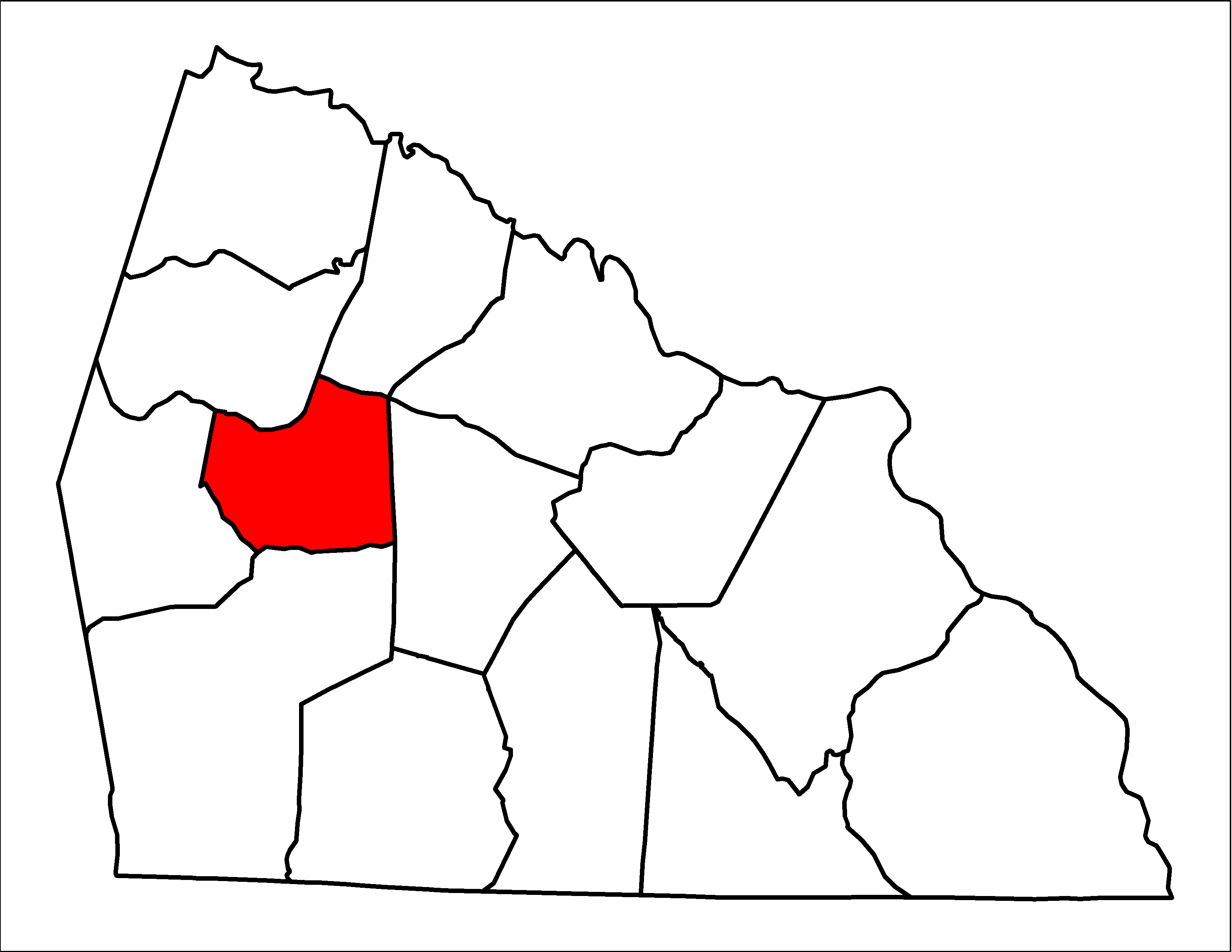
- Location of Steele Township in Rowan County

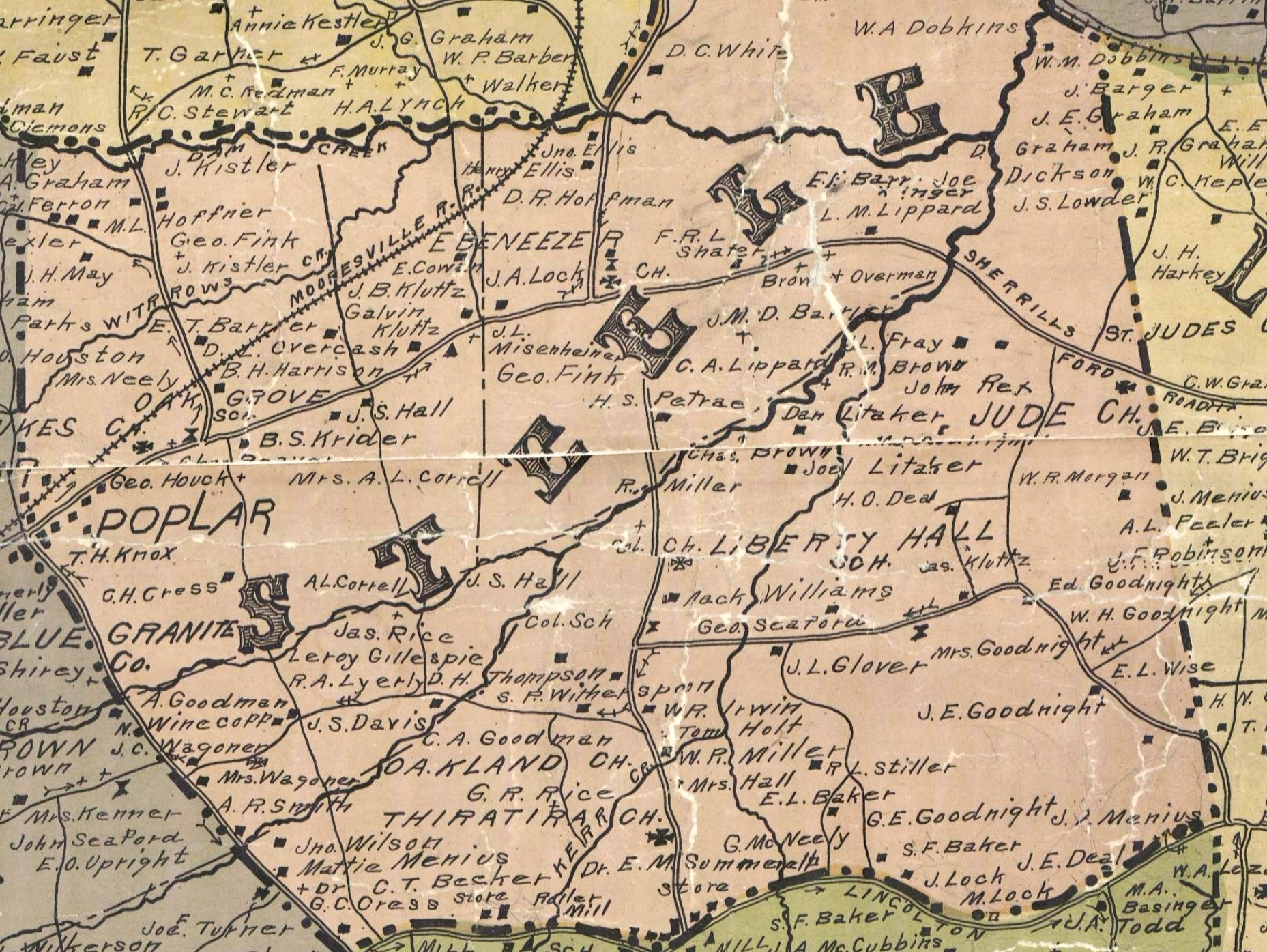
- Steele Township in 1903

- Location within North Carolina Location within the United States
- Country: United States
- State: North Carolina
- County: Rowan
- Established in: 1868

Government
  - Type: non-functioning county subdivision

Area
  - Total: 21.97 sq mi (56.9 km^{2})

Population (2010)
  - Total: 1,725
- Time zone: UTC-5 (Eastern (EST))
  - Summer (DST): UTC-4 (EDT)

Steele Township is one of fourteen townships in Rowan County, North Carolina, United States. The township had a population of 1,725 according to the 2010 census. It was named after Gen. John Steele

== Geography ==
Steele Township is located in western central Rowan County and occupies 21.97 square miles (56.9 km^{2}). There are no incorporated municipalities in Steele Township.

The northern border of the township follows Beaverdam and Withrow Creeks, NC Hwy 801, and the Norfolk Southern railroad to Second Creek. The eastern border goes along Richard Road and Lowder Road then goes straight down to NC Hwy 150. NC Hwy 150 & Sloan Road make up the southern border of Steele Township. The western border follows Upright Road, Lyerly Road, Graham Road, NC Hwy 801 then goes north & meets with Beaverdam Creek.

== Sites of interest ==
The following churches, historic sites, communities, and other places of interest are located in Steele Township:

=== Communities ===
- Bear Poplar, since about 1775 (Post office existed from 1868 to 1966)
- Mill Bridge, since about 1874 (post office existed from 1874 to 1903)

=== Churches ===
- Ebenezer Church (formerly Ebenezer United Methodist Church), established in 1853
- Mt. Zion Baptist Church, Boyden Quarters, established in 1853
- New Smith Chapel Church
- St. Luke's Evangelical Lutheran Church, established in 1869
- Thyatira Presbyterian Church, established about 1749

=== Historic Sites of Interest ===
There are 3 National Register of Historic Places listings that are located in Steele Township. They are:

- Hall Family House
- Owen-Harrison House
- Wood Grove

Former sites of interest in Steele Township:

- Dr. E. M. Summerell's Store
- Dr. G. C. Cress's Store
- Jude Church (possibly St. Jude Church which, if correct, is still an active church and is known today as Sherrills Ford Road Baptist Church)
- Liberty Hall School
- Oak Grove School
- Oakland Presbyterian Church; established 1867, closed 1968

== Adjacent townships ==
- Atwell – south
- Cleveland – northwest
- Franklin – northeast
- Locke – east
- Mount Ulla – west
- Unity – north
