= Chambersburg Township =

Chambersburg Township may refer to:

- Chambersburg Township, North Carolina
- Chambersburg Township, Illinois

== See also ==
- Chambersburg (disambiguation)
