= Chambersburg (disambiguation) =

Chambersburg, Pennsylvania is a borough in the South Central region of Pennsylvania.

Chambersburg may also refer to several places:

- Chambersburg, Illinois
- Chambersburg, Indiana
- Chambersburg Township, Pike County, Illinois
- Chambersburg Township, Iredell County, North Carolina
- Chambersburg, Missouri
- Chambersburg, Trenton, New Jersey, a neighborhood within the South Trenton neighborhood in Trenton, New Jersey
- Chambersburg, Ohio
  - Chambersburg Area Senior High School
