= Kerr Mill =

- U.S. National Register of Historic Places
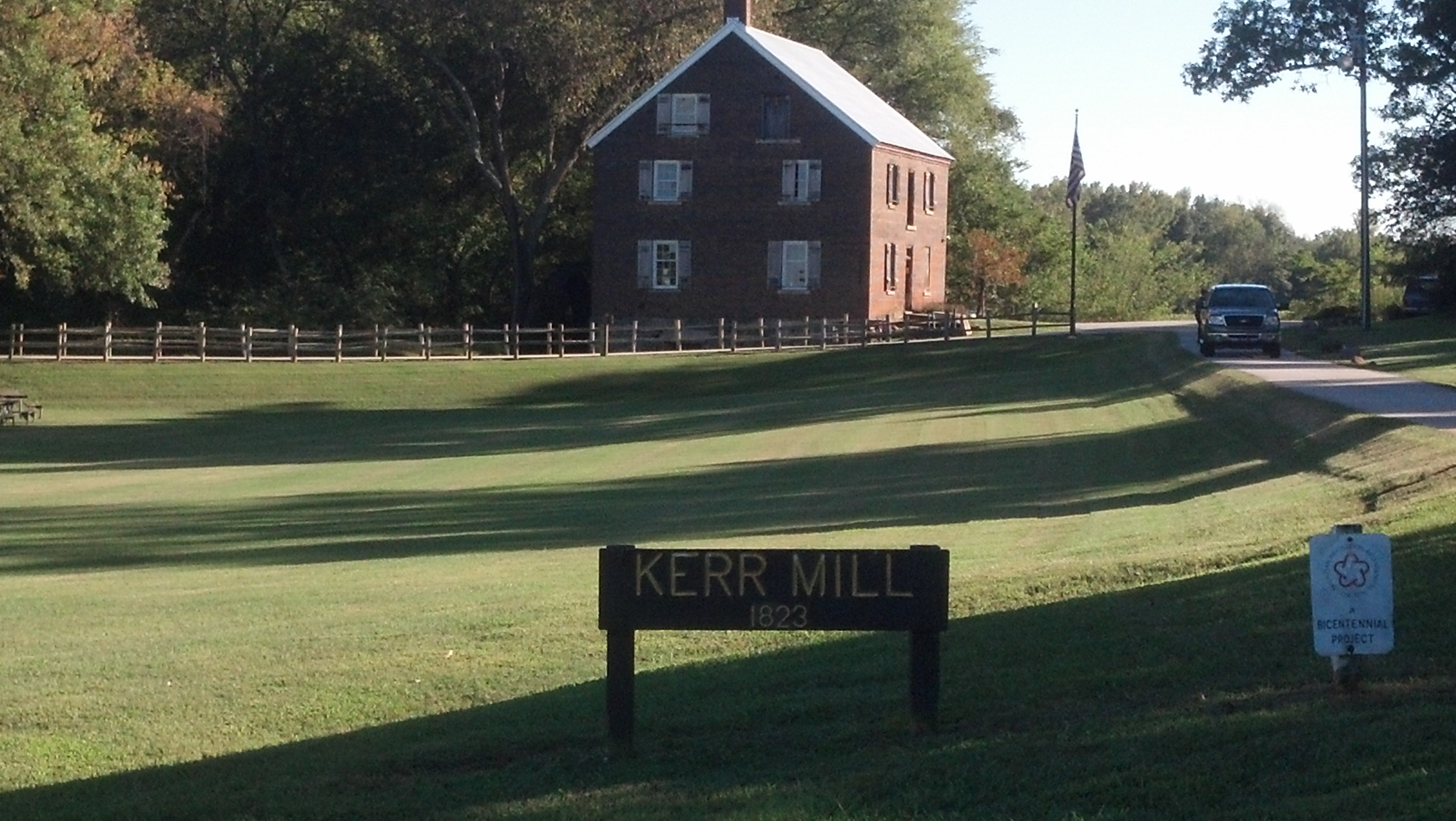
- Kerr Mill, September 2012

- Location within North Carolina Location within the United States
- Location: 550 Sloan Rd, Mount Ulla, NC, near Mill Bridge, North Carolina
- Coordinates: 35°31′11″N 80°25′21″W
- Area: 6 acres (2.4 ha)
- Built: c. 1820
- NRHP reference No.: 76001337
- Added to NRHP: May 11, 1976

Kerr Mill is a historic grist mill building located in Atwell Township, Rowan County, North Carolina near Mill Bridge. It was constructed in 1823 by Joseph Kerr, a large plantation owner. The mill is a brick building with two-stories and three bay by two bay. It rests on a stone foundation and has a gable roof. The mill was operated commercially until the 1940s and has since been refurbished as part of Sloan Park run by Rowan County. The mill and surrounding property are operated by Rowan County as Sloan Park.

It was listed on the National Register of Historic Places in 1976.

== History ==
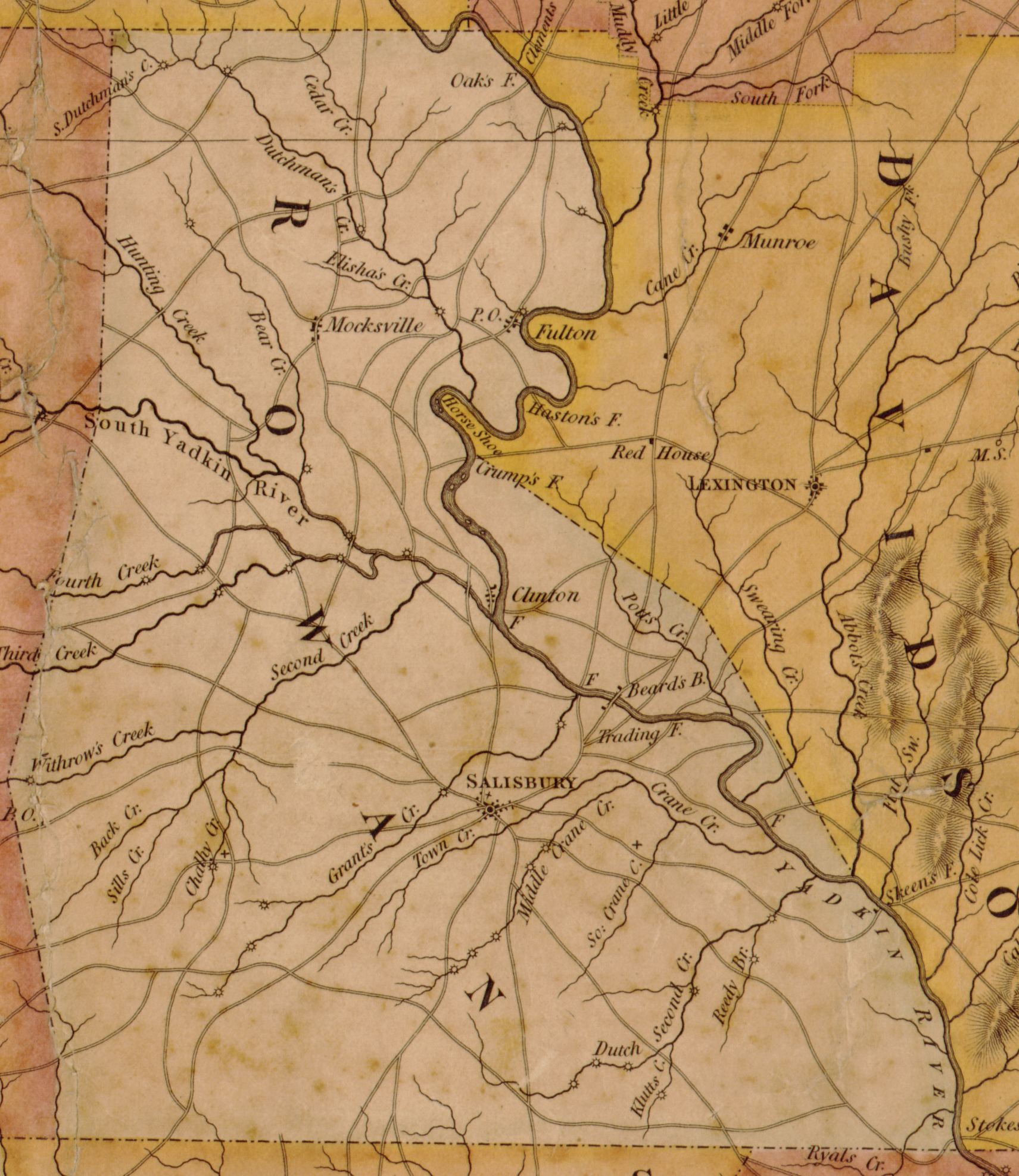
1833 map of Rowan County showing Kerr Mill on Chathy's (sic Cathey's) Creek west of Salisbury.

The Kerr Mill was constructed by Joseph Kerr in 1823 on his 1,500-acre plantation, called Oakland, between Sills and Cathey's Creeks in Rowan County, North Carolina. After Joseph's death, the mill was run by his son, Dr. Samuel Kerr. Samuel Kerr was destroyed financially by the U.S. Civil War. After the war the mill was operated on a small scale from 1865–1872 for local tenant farmers. The mill and Kerr plantation were purchased by James Samuel McCubbins in 1872. The mill was then run using an undershot wheel fed by a long mill race and canal. In 1887 the mill was upgrade to a roller mill powered by a steam engine. The mill was purchased by John W. Page in 1895, Pleasant Owen Tatum in 1900, and James Wiseman Sloan in 1908. The mill was converted to run with a Bessemer diesel engine in 1925. The mill was sold to James W. Sloan's nephew, James Andrew Sloan in 1928. The mill was offered as a gift to the citizens of Rowan County in 1973 by James Sloan and his wife. It has since been restored and become part of Sloan Park operated by Rowan County's Department of Parks and Recreation.
