= Mill Bridge, North Carolina =

- Populated place
- Interactive map of Mill Bridge, North Carolina
- Coordinates: 35°38′49″N 80°38′13″W
- Country: United States
- State: North Carolina
- County: Rowan
- Township: Atwell, Steele
- Elevation: 787 ft (240 m)
- Time zone: UTC-5 (Eastern (EST))
  - Summer (DST): UTC-4 (EDT)
- Area code: 704

Mill Bridge is an unincorporated community and populated place officially registered as Mill Bridge in 1874. It is located primarily in Atwell Township and Steele Township in Rowan County, North Carolina, United States. With part extending into Mount Ulla Township. The prominent features include the Kerr Mill, Thyatira Presbyterian Church, and Millbridge Speedway.

== History ==
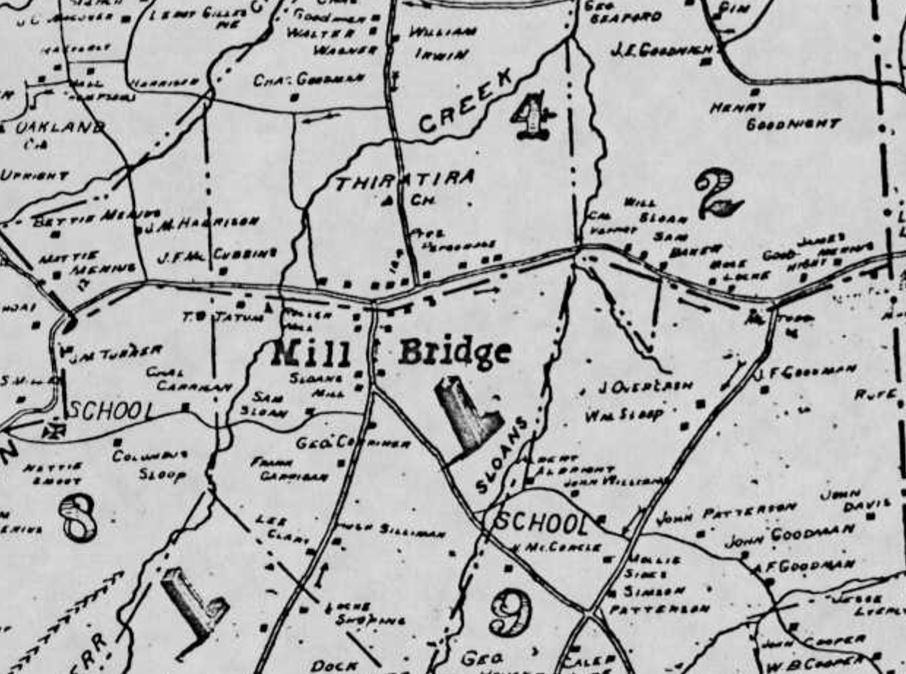
1903 Map of Mill Bridge region in Rowan County, North Carolina by C. M. Miller

While there have been farmers and large plantations in the area since the mid-1700s, the community of Mill Bridge was not officially registered until 1874. The Mill Bridge post office existed from July 23, 1874, to September 30, 1903, with Mary E. McCubbin as the first postmaster. In the 1880s, Mill Bridge was a small prosperous agricultural community, centered around it historic Thyatira Presbyterian Church. After the Civil War, many freed slaves remained in the region, where there community was centered around the church, Oakland Presbyterian Church, which was established by the Northern Presbyterian Church.

While Mill Bridge has never been used as a U.S. Census or demographic location, it has been used as a postal location and the population has never been more than a few hundred people based on available maps. The nearby historic sites, including Kerr Mill, Owen-Harrison House, and Thyatira Presbyterian Church have defined the community.

=== Post office ===
All of the postmasters of Mill Bridge were women:

- Mary E. McCubbin, started Jul 23, 1874
- Belle M. Ramsay, started December 12, 1879
- Eula J. Sloan, started July 7, 1880
- Eualia "Eula" Jamima (Sloan) Bradshaw (1861–1929), started April 7, 1884
- Sarah J. Sloan (1839–1897), started March 29, 1886
- Jennie L. Sloan, started December 2, 1897
- Lucy C. Gillespie, started December 28, 1900
- post office discontinued on September 30, 1903

The 1860 U.S. Federal Census for Rowan County lists a postal route for Miranda. This post office existed from September 12, 1827 to January 25, 1871 and from February 9, 1886 to September 30, 1903. The Miranda post office was located near Mill Bridge or may have been a predecessor before 1871 for Mill Bridge. According to the 1860 U.S. Census, there were 440 free persons enumerated in the Miranda post office, including 70 families in 70 houses. Most were farmers by occupation. Other occupations included school teachers, shoemakers, blacksmiths, buggy makers, carpenters, and two millers (George Hendrix and Green Eller).

During the 1820s, Joseph Kerr was one of the largest and wealthiest plantation owners in Rowan County. His plantation included 1,500 acres between Sills and Cathey's Creeks and thirty to forty slaves. The community surrounding his plantation was registered as Kerrsville in 1827 when a post office was established at the Kerr plantation. Joseph died in 1829. The post office lasted only one year and was changed to Miranda, the plantation of John and James McConnaughy.
