= Bethesda Presbyterian Church (Houstonville, North Carolina) =

Historic church in North Carolina, United States

- Bethesda Presbyterian Church, Session House and Cemetery
- U.S. National Register of Historic Places
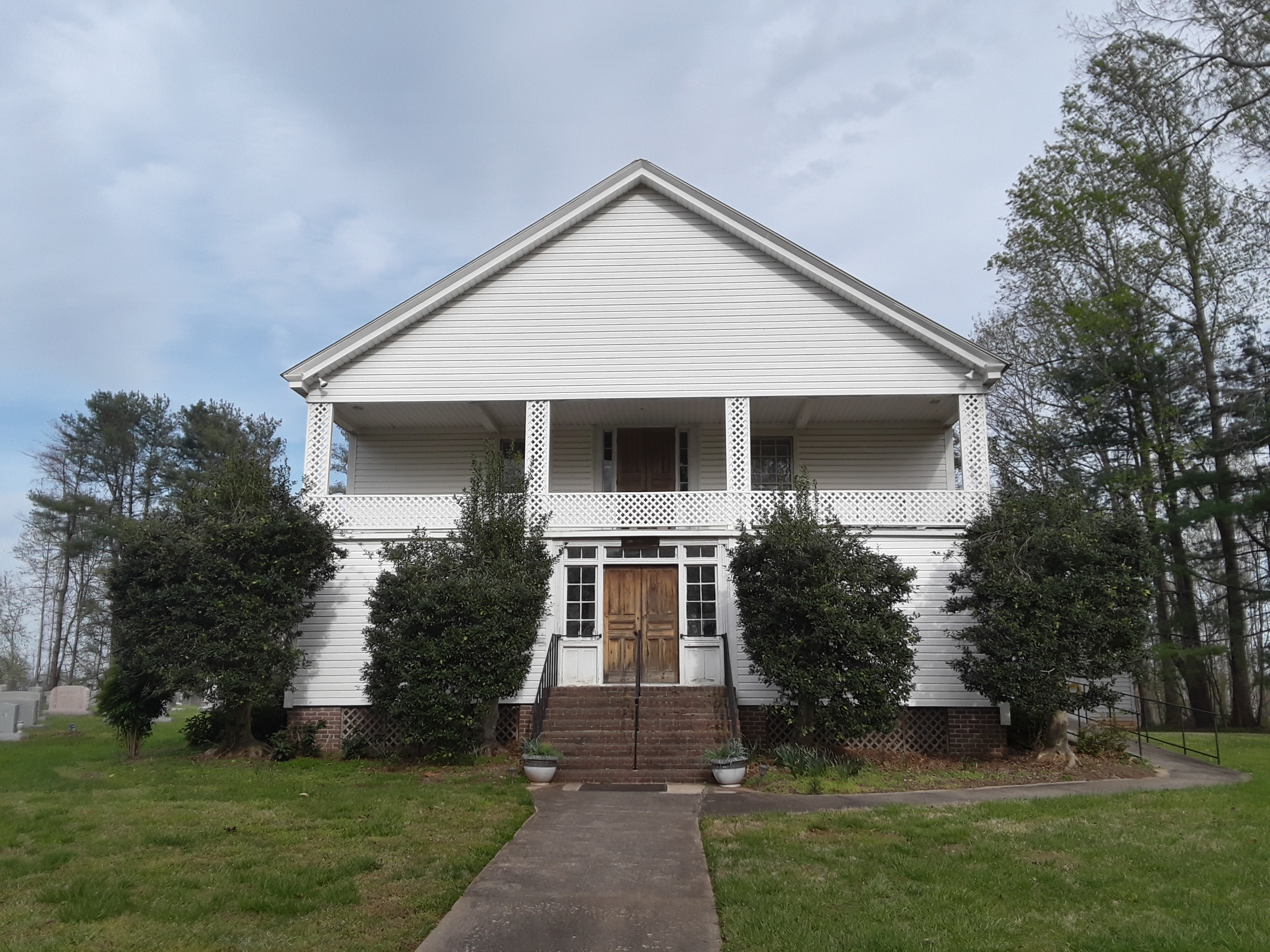
- Front of the church, April 2022

- Location within North Carolina Location within the United States
- Location: SR 2359
- Nearest city: Amity Hill, North Carolina
- Coordinates: 35°43′15″N 80°48′19″W
- Area: 5 acres (2.0 ha)
- Built: 1853
- Architectural style: vernacular Greek Revival
- MPS: Iredell County MRA
- NRHP reference No.: 80002855
- Added to NRHP: December 8, 1980

Bethesda Presbyterian Church, Session House and Cemetery is a historic Presbyterian church, session house, and cemetery located in Chambersburg Township, Iredell County, North Carolina. It was built in 1853, and is a one-story, three bay by five bay, rectangular vernacular Greek Revival style frame church. It has a pedimented, temple form, front gable roof and an unusual front recessed balcony. It is the oldest church building in Iredell County. Also on the property is the contributing session house, also built in 1853, and church cemetery with about 200 gravestones.

It was added to the National Register of Historic Places in 1980.

== History ==
The Bethesda Presbyterian Church was organized on August 23, 1847 near Amity Hill in Iredell County. The original fourteen members of the church had come from the Third Creek, Back Creek, Thyatira, and Fourth Creek Presbyterian churches in Iredell and Rowan Counties. The first pastor in 1848 was the Rev. Thomas E. Davis. Until the first building was built, the congregation met in brush arbors and a nearby school house. The membership was 85 in 1855, including 46 white, 36 slave, and three free black members. Initially, slaves and black members sat in the balcony of the church. The church was still in use in 2022.

Northeast of the church building is the cemetery existing in an open field with no fencing. The cemetery contains roughly 200 gravestones from the 19th-century.
