= Knox-Johnstone House =

Historic house in North Carolina, United States

- U.S. National Register of Historic Places
- Location within North Carolina Location within the United States
- Location: 100 Beaumont Farm Rd., Cleveland, North Carolina
- Coordinates: 35°44′1″N 80°40′58″W
- Area: 1.8 acres (0.73 ha)
- Built: c. 1880
- Architectural style: Italianate
- NRHP reference No.: 93000737
- Added to NRHP: August 5, 1993

Knox-Johnstone House, also known as Ben Allen Knox House, is a historic home located near Cleveland, Rowan County, North Carolina. It was built about 1880, and is a two-story weatherboarded frame farmhouse with Italianate-style finish. It has a projecting center, entrance bay, and a nearly full-facade porch. Also on the property is the contributing large bell-cast gambrel roof barn dated to the 1930s.

It was listed on the National Register of Historic Places in 1993.
