= Bear Poplar, North Carolina =

- Populated place
- Interactive map of Bear Poplar, North Carolina
- Coordinates: 35°40′34″N 80°41′36″W
- Country: United States
- State: North Carolina
- County: Rowan
- Time zone: UTC-5 (Eastern (EST))
  - Summer (DST): UTC-4 (EDT)
- Area code: 704
- GNIS feature ID: 1019855

Bear Poplar is an unincorporated community mostly within Steele Township in Rowan County, North Carolina, United States. Some of the western part extends into neighboring Mount Ulla Township.

== History ==
There are two stories of the name origin. The community was first known as Forty-Four because it was located 44 miles from Charlotte and Winston-Salem. The community got its name Bear Poplar around 1775 when Thomas Cowan was walking with his wife and child about a mile away from his farm when they noticed a bear crossing the road which then ran up a big poplar tree. According to another source, the community was first known as Rocky Mount, the name of a plantation owned by Henry Kesler. It was renamed to Bear Poplar in 1878 when the first post office was established.

Although a road bears the name of the community, the center of Bear Poplar isn't at Bear Poplar Road. It is located about a mile away at the intersection of NC 801 Hwy, Hall, & Graham roads. The community extends about a mile in each direction from this intersection; the eastern border is located right before Bear Poplar Road.

At some point Bear Poplar had four stores, two cotton gins, a foundry, a garage, a blue granite quarry, a school, a blacksmith shop, and a post office. The first Post Mistress, Lucy J. Kistler, was appointed in 1878. Bear Poplar Post Office ceased operation in 1966. The community is now served by Mount Ulla Post Office.

An ancestral seat of Cowan and Krider families, Wood Grove, is located just outside Bear Poplar.

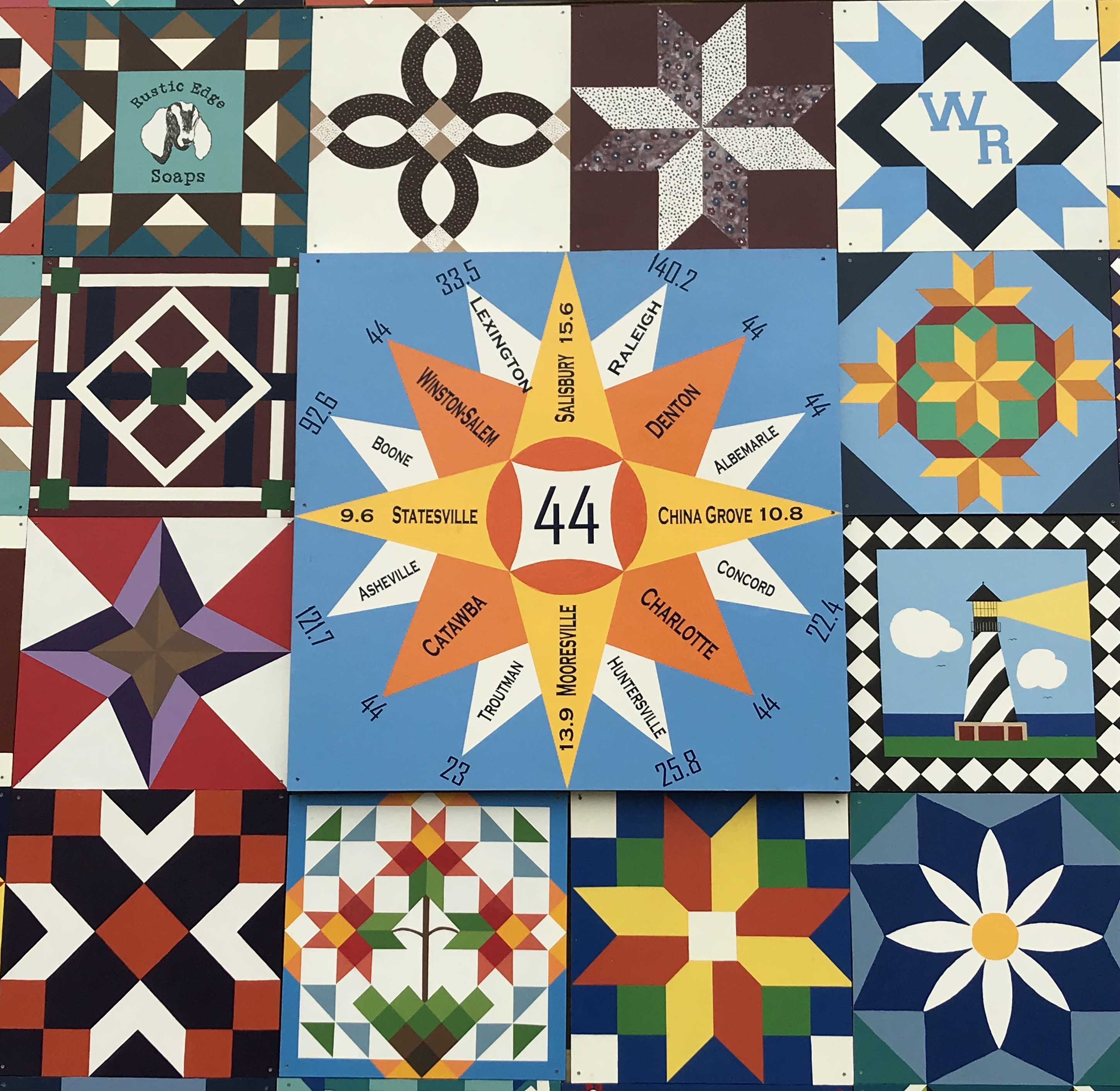
A tribute to the historical name of Bear Poplar, Forty-Four, as part of Mount Ulla Barn Quilt, the largest community barn quilt in the United States from 2019 to 2021.

Mount Ulla Barn Quilt, the largest community barn quilt in the United States from 2019 to 2021, is on the wall of a local Bear Poplar store, Elsie's (formerly West Rowan Farm, Home & Garden). The Mount Ulla Community Barn Quilt is 500 square feet, twenty square feet larger than the previous title holder—a community barn quilt in Ashland, Kansas. The Mount Ulla Barn Quilt held this title from 8 July 2019 until it was surpassed on 23 October 2021 by the "Always Original Barn Quilt Mural" in the nearby town of Cleveland, North Carolina.

=== Postmasters ===
The Bear Poplar Post office first opened on 12 Sep 1878 with Lucy J. Kistler postmistress. There would be 9 more postmasters until it ceased operations in 1966:

- Lucy J. Kistler, started 12 Sep 1878
- Wellington L. Kistler, husband of Lucy, started 25 Jun 1879
- John Welley Clampet, started 8 Oct 1897
- Dovey Isabella Holler, started 5 Mar 1898
- Mary J. Barrier, started 23 Apr 1898
- Thomas Henry Knox, started 9 Dec 1904
- Charles McDuffy Johnston (records show his last name as Johnson although research has suggested it was Johnston), acting postmaster, started 13 Nov 1926
- Charles Luther Beaver, acting postmaster, started 13 Sep 1927
- Robert Lee Steele, acting postmaster, started 29 Jul 1942
- Margaret Emma Steele, wife of previous postmaster, started 23 Jun 1948

On 11 February 1966, the Bear Poplar post office was changed to a rural branch of the Salisbury Post Office. The post office in Bear Poplar was completely closed 7 years later on 23 June 1973.
