= R.A. Clement School =

Historic school building in North Carolina, United States

- U.S. National Register of Historic Places
- Location within North Carolina Location within the United States
- Location: 216 Krider St., Cleveland, North Carolina
- Coordinates: 35°44′07″N 80°40′10″W
- Built: 1929
- NRHP reference No.: 100003300
- Added to NRHP: January 10, 2019

R.A. Clement School is a historic school located at Cleveland, Rowan County, North Carolina.

The H-shaped brick building was built in 1929 as a Rosenwald school. Rufus Alexander Clement, born a slave in 1847, helped to get the school built along with his wife Emma. Four teachers taught African-American students in eleven grades. For the twelfth grade students went to J. C. Price High School in Salisbury. The school closed in 1968, after which a group later known as West Rowan Neighborhood Center Advisory Council bought the building and made it a community center. Eventually, the advisory council could not keep the property, which stood empty until 2003 when the alumni association purchased it and started renovations.

It was listed on the National Register of Historic Places January 10, 2019.
