= Barber Farm (Cleveland, North Carolina) =

Historic district in North Carolina, United States

- U.S. National Register of Historic Places
- U.S. Historic district
- Location within North Carolina Location within the United States
- Location: 225 Redmon Rd., near Cleveland, North Carolina
- Coordinates: 35°42′57″N 80°38′42″W
- Area: 241 acres (98 ha)
- Built: c. 1855
- Built by: Graham, James
- Architectural style: Greek Revival
- NRHP reference No.: 02001717
- Added to NRHP: January 15, 2003

Barber Farm, also known as Luckland, is a historic farm complex and national historic district located near Cleveland, Rowan County, North Carolina. The Jacob Barber House was built about 1855, and is a two-story, single-pile, three-bay vernacular Greek Revival style frame dwelling. It has a one-story rear ell and a one-story shed roofed rear porch. Its builder James Graham also built the Robert Knox House and the Hall Family House. Other contributing resources are the cow barn (c. 1947), smokehouse (c. 1880 / 1940s), granary (c. 1855), double crib log barn (c. 1855), well house (c. 1940), log corn crib / barn (c. 1855 / 1940), carriage house (c. 1890), school (c. 1910), Edward W. Barber House (1870s), Edward W. Barber Well House (1870s), North Carolina Midland Railroad Right-of-Way (c. 1899), and the agricultural landscape.

It was listed on the National Register of Historic Places in 2003.
