= Christ Episcopal Church (Cleveland, North Carolina) =

Historic church in North Carolina, United States

- U.S. National Register of Historic Places
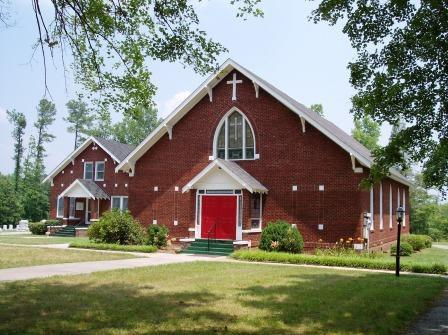
- Christ Episcopal Church, September 2013

- Location within North Carolina Location within the United States
- Location: 3430 Old US 70, near Cleveland, North Carolina
- Coordinates: 35°43′59″N 80°39′55″W
- Area: 10.09 acres (4.08 ha)
- Built: 1826-1827, 1926
- Built by: Fleming, Samuel; Heathman, J.
- Architectural style: Gothic Revival, Craftsman
- NRHP reference No.: 11000623
- Added to NRHP: December 5, 2011

Christ Episcopal Church is a historic Episcopal church complex located near Cleveland, Rowan County, North Carolina, USA. The complex includes the 1826-1827 gable-front vernacular Gothic Revival- and American Craftsman-style brick veneered, heavy timber frame chapel; a 1926 Craftsman-style parish house attached to the original building by an open brick arcaded breezeway; and a historic cemetery.

It was added to the National Register of Historic Places in 2011.
