= Hall Family House =

Historic house in North Carolina, United States

- U.S. National Register of Historic Places
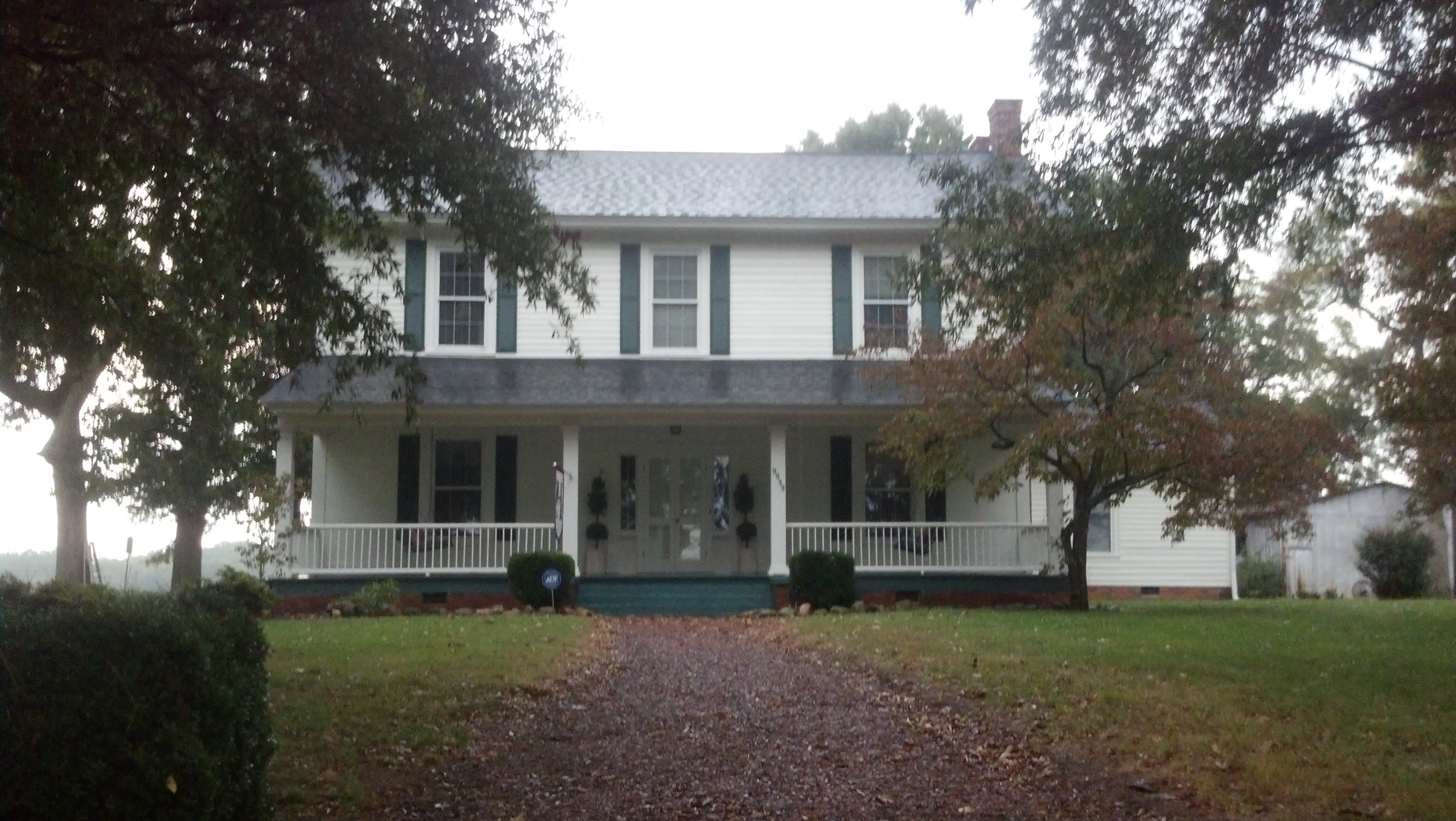
- Hall Family House, September 2012

- Location within North Carolina Location within the United States
- Location: 9935 NC 801 Hwy, Mount Ulla, NC near Bear Poplar, North Carolina
- Coordinates: 35°40′54″N 80°39′52″W
- Area: 244 acres (99 ha)
- Built: 1856
- Built by: James Graham
- Architectural style: Greek Revival
- NRHP reference No.: 82001305
- Added to NRHP: October 5, 1982

Hall Family House is a historic home and farm located near Bear Poplar, Rowan County, North Carolina. The farmhouse was built in 1856–1857, and is a two-story, three-bay, "L"-plan Greek Revival style frame dwelling. It has a full-width front porch and two-story rear ell. Its builder James Graham also built the Jacob Barber House and the Robert Knox House. Also on the property are the contributing triple-pen log barn, log smokehouse, water tank, milking parlor, and barn (1925).

It was listed on the National Register of Historic Places in 1982.
