= Chambersburg, Illinois =

Chambersburg
- Unincorporated community
- Location of Chambersburg within Illinois Chambersburg (the United States)
- Coordinates: 39°49′02″N 090°39′26″W
- Country: United States
- State: Illinois
- County: Pike
- Township: Chambersburg
- Elevation: 466 ft (142 m)
- Time zone: UTC-6 (CST)
  - Summer (DST): UTC-5 (CDT)
- ZIP code: 62323
- Area code: 217
- GNIS feature ID: 405934

Chambersburg is an unincorporated community in Pike County, Illinois, United States.

== See also ==
- List of unincorporated communities in Illinois
