= Knox Farm Historic District =

Historic farm in North Carolina, United States

- U.S. National Register of Historic Places
- U.S. Historic district
- Location within North Carolina Location within the United States
- Location: 3485 Amity Hill Rd., near Cleveland, North Carolina
- Coordinates: 35°43′01″N 80°44′49″W
- Area: 890 acres (360 ha)
- Built: 1854-1856
- Built by: James Graham
- Architectural style: Greek Revival
- NRHP reference No.: 83001914
- Added to NRHP: April 1, 1983

Knox Farm Historic District is a historic farm complex and national historic district located near Cleveland, Rowan County, North Carolina. The Robert Knox House was built between 1854 and 1856, and is a two-story, single-pile, three-bay vernacular Greek Revival style frame dwelling. It has a two-story rear ell, one-story rear kitchen ell. Its builder James Graham also built the Jacob Barber House and the Hall Family House. Other contributing resources are the log corn crib, reaper shed (c. 1870-1880), power plan (c. 1945), chicken house (c. 1930), brooder house (c. 1930), log smokehouse, barn (c. 1839-1845), main barn (1916), milking parlor (1948), spring house (18th century), tenant house (1920), and Knox Chapel Methodist Church (1870s).

It was listed on the National Register of Historic Places in 1983.
