= John Phifer Farm =

Historic farm in North Carolina, United States

- U.S. National Register of Historic Places
- U.S. Historic district
- Location within North Carolina Location within the United States
- Location: Jct. of Phifer Rd. and SR 1978, near Cleveland, North Carolina
- Coordinates: 35°46′48″N 80°43′24″W
- Area: 234.7 acres (95.0 ha)
- Built: 1819
- Built by: Phifer, John
- Architectural style: Vernacular 19th & 20th Centu
- NRHP reference No.: 90001991
- Added to NRHP: December 28, 1990

John Phifer Farm is a historic farm complex and national historic district located near Cleveland, Rowan County, North Carolina, United States. The Jacob Phifer House was built in the 1850s, and is a two-story, rectangular, weatherboarded log dwelling. The oldest building is the John Phifer House, built about 1819, and is a small two-story log dwelling. Other contributing resources are the double-pen log barn (c. 1858), tool shed (1930s), garage (1920s / 1930s), granary and corn crib (c. 1858), spring house (c. 1930), blacksmith shop (c. 1925), two chicken houses (1930s, c. 1940), log chicken coop (1930s), wood shed (c. 1930), smokehouse (c. 1858), privy (c. 1930), scalding vat (c. 1935), log tobacco barn (c. 1895), and the farm landscape.

It was listed on the National Register of Historic Places in 1990.
