= Amity Hill, North Carolina =

- Unincorporated community
- Location within North Carolina Location within the United States
- Coordinates: 35°43′19.4″N 80°52′16.15″W
- Country: United States
- State: North Carolina
- County: Iredell
- Elevation: 879 ft (268 m)
- Time zone: UTC-5 (Eastern (EST))
  - Summer (DST): UTC-4 (EDT)
- ZIP code: 27013
- Area codes: 704, 980
- GNIS feature ID: 980168

Amity Hill is a populated place in Chambersburg Township, Iredell County, North Carolina, United States. The community is 8.75 miles (14.08 km) south southeast of Statesville. The Wayside Volunteer Fire Department is located in the Amity Hill community.

== History ==
A post office was established at Amity Hill on July 5, 1851. The post office name was changed to Amity on May 2, 1892, and it was discontinued November 15, 1906.
