= Wood Grove =

Historic house in North Carolina, United States

- U.S. National Register of Historic Places
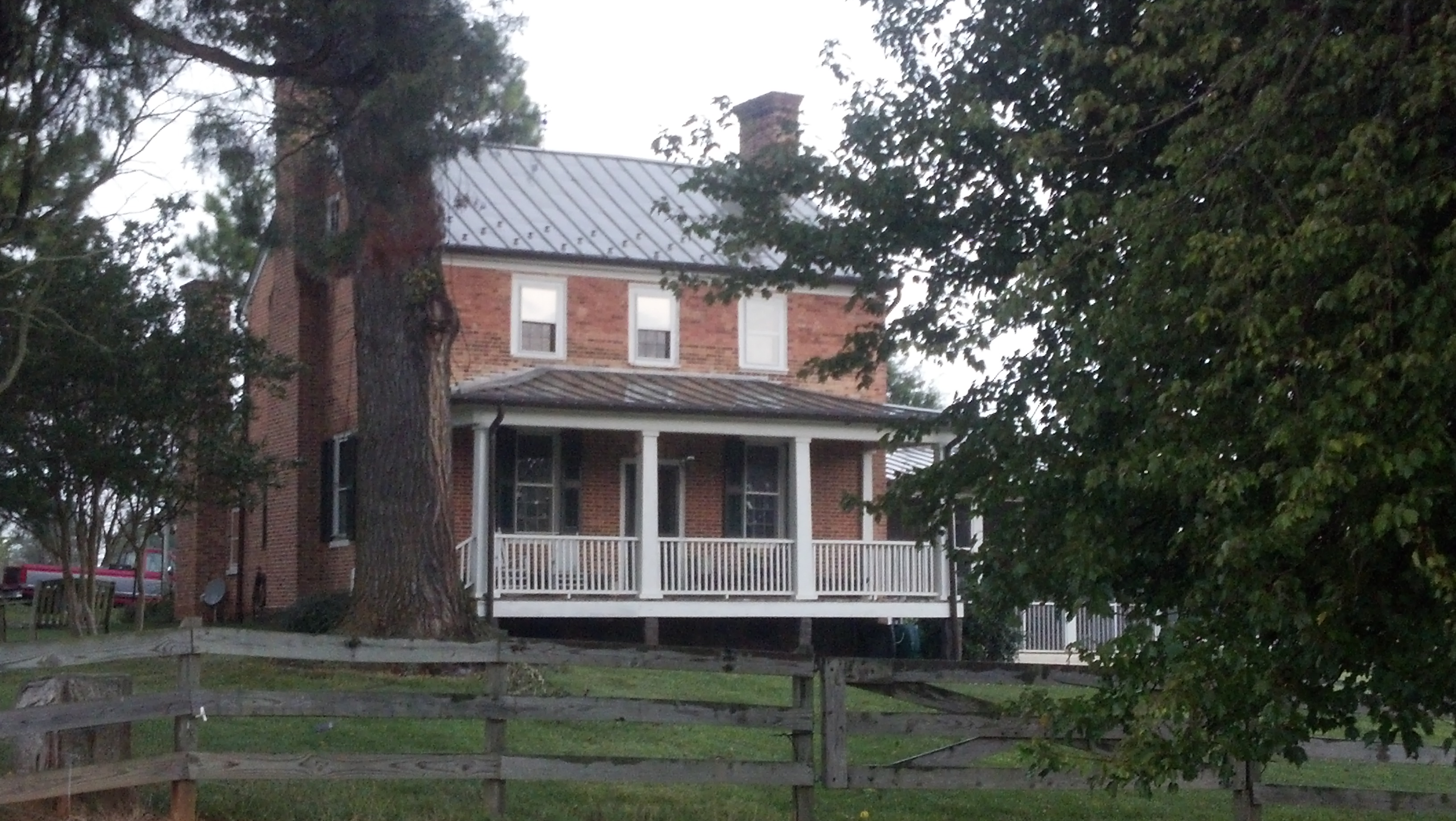
- Wood Grove, September 2012

- Location within North Carolina Location within the United States
- Location: 185 Cress Road, near Bear Poplar, North Carolina
- Coordinates: 35°40′54.066″N 80°40′35.5326″W
- Area: 83.8 acres (33.9 ha)
- Built: c. 1825
- Architectural style: Federal
- NRHP reference No.: 82003504
- Added to NRHP: September 23, 1982

Wood Grove is a historic plantation house located near Bear Poplar, Rowan County, North Carolina. It was built about 1825, and is a 2 1/2-story, three-bay, Federal-style brick dwelling. A portion of the brickwork is laid in Flemish bond. It sits on a stone foundation, has a hipped roof front porch, and one-story rear kitchen ell.

It was listed on the National Register of Historic Places in 1982.

== History ==
The original owners were Thomas Cowan (1748-1817) and Abel Cowan (1789-1843).
