= Chambersburg Township, North Carolina =

Chambersburg Township
- Township
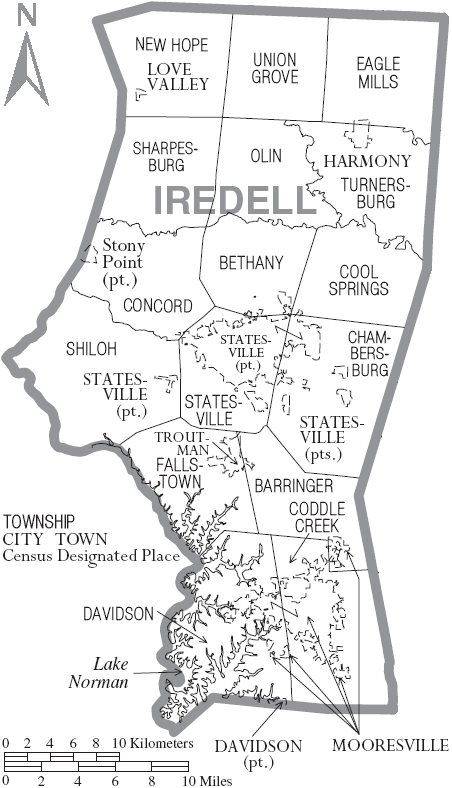
- Barringer Township in Iredell County
- Country: United States
- State: North Carolina
- County: Iredell
- Established: 1868

Government
  - Type: non-functioning county subdivision

Area
  - Total: 48.40 sq mi (125.36 km^{2})
  - Land: 48.10 sq mi (124.58 km^{2})
  - Water: 0.30 sq mi (0.78 km^{2})
- Elevation: 866 ft (264 m)

Population (2010)
  - Total: 11,344
  - Density: 236/sq mi (91.1/km^{2})
- Time zone: UTC-5 (Eastern (EST))
  - Summer (DST): UTC-4 (EDT)
- ZIP Codes: 27013, 28166, 28625, 28677
- Area codes: 704, 980
- FIPS code: 097-90616
- GNIS feature ID: 1026814

Chambersburg Township is a township in Iredell County, North Carolina, United States. The 2010 United States census reported a total population of 11,344.

== Geography ==
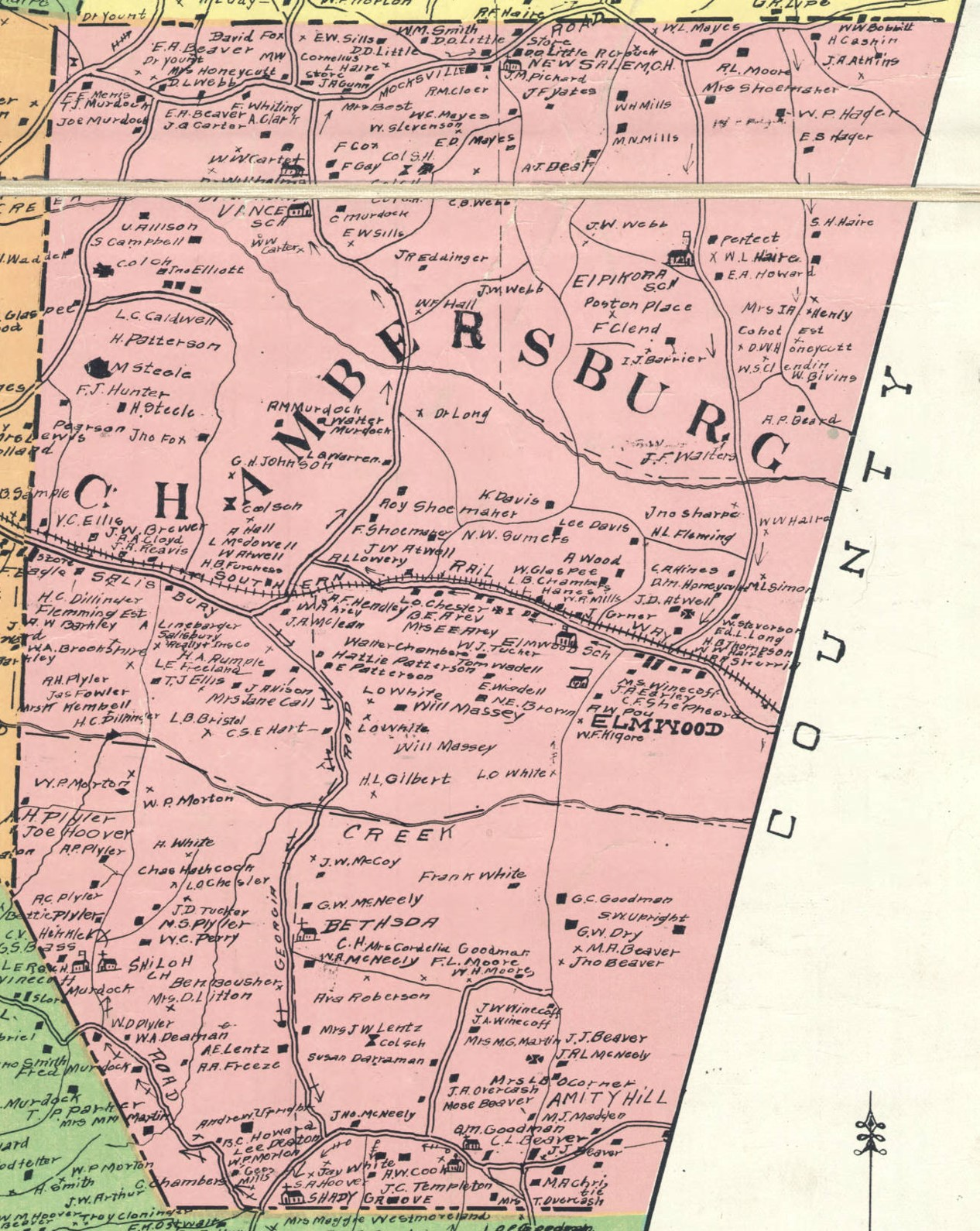
Chambersburg Township in 1917

Chambersburg Township covers an area of 48.4 square miles (125.36 km^{2}), and of this, 0.3 square miles (0.78 km^{2}), or 0.62 percent, is water.

Chambersburg Township lies within the Yadkin–Pee Dee River Basin. Bodies of water within Chambersburg Township include the following. This is not a complete list.

- South Yadkin River
- Duck Creek
- Fourth Creek
- Greasy Creek
- I-L Creek
- Little Creek
- Third Creek

=== City ===
- Statesville (part)

=== Unincorporated communities ===
- Amity Hill

=== Historical sites of interest ===
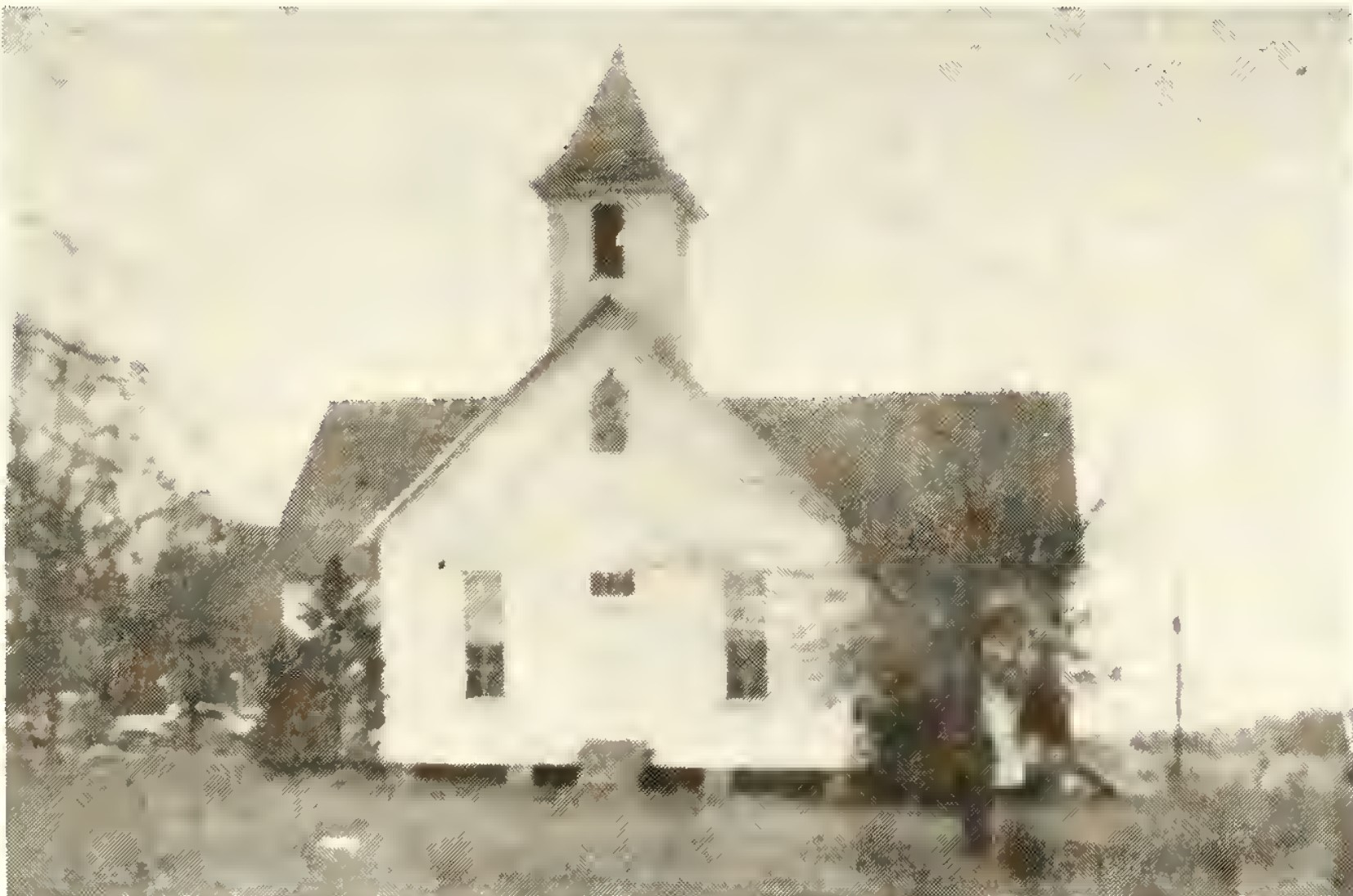
Second church building of the New Salem Methodist Church in 1900

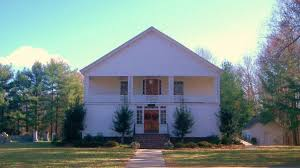
Bethesda Presbyterian Church

- Beavers Country Store, 35°48′30″N 80°48′17″W
- Bethesda Methodist Church, organized as AME Zion in early 1900s
- Bethesda Presbyterian Church (oldest existing church building in Iredell County, built in 1853), 35°43′15″N 80°48′19″W
- Cool Springs Volunteer Fire Department, organized in 1960, 35°48′27″N 80°48′10″W
- Congers Post Office (1874–1880)
- Elpikora Two Room School, destroyed by fire in May 1916
- Elmwood
- Elmwood Post Office (1878–1954), 35°45′22″N 80°45′27″W
- Elmwood First Baptist Church
- Elmwood Presbyterian Church, organized in 1887
- Elmwood School
- Enola Post Office (1858–1872)
- First demonstration, J.F. Eagles became the first North Carolina farmer to undertake a demonstration under the supervision of a county agent, 35°45′58″N 80°50′27″W
- Farmville Plantation, formerly known as the Chambers Plantation
- Lingle School
- New Salem Methodist Church, organized in 1870
- New Union Methodist Church, established in 1836
- Plyers Church, became Shiloh Church, early 1800s
- Plyers School
- Vance School and Post Office (historical), 35°48′21″N 80°48′28″W

The Enola Post Office (1858–1872) was established west of Statesville at the intersection of the Western Road and Georgia Road when the Western North Carolina Railroad was completed in 1858. The first postmaster was Robert Wallace Leslie (1835–1894). The Enola Post Office was used in enumeration of residents in the 1860 and 1870 U.S. Federal Census. The postal route covered residents north of the rail line to the South Yadkin River and south of the rail line in School District 51. While the name "Enola" is reported to have come from a popular novel of the day (Enola; Or, Her Fatal Mistake by Mary Young Ridenbaugh, published in 1886), it most likely predates this book. "Enola" is "Alone" spelled backwards. Although the Enola Post Office was discontinued in 1872, Thomas J. Conger established a post office there in 1889, called Conger's. Conger's was discontinued in 1880. The main post office and rail station east of Statesville was later known as Elmwood.

The community of Vance was located in Chambersburg Springs Township from 1882 to 1901 with William W. Turner (1844–1926) as first post master.

=== Cemeteries ===
Cemeteries exist within the boundaries of Chambersburg Township at the following locations. This is not to be considered a complete list.

- Abilene Church – 35°48′20.5″N 80°48′20.3″W
- Amity Evangelical Lutheran Church – 35°41′54.7″N 80°47′04.4″W
- Antioch Baptist Church – 35°42′26.2″N 80°46′40.7″W
- Belmont Cemetery – 35°46′23.9″N 80°50′57.1″W
- Bethesda Presbyterian Church Cemetery – 35°43′15″N 80°48′20″W
- Faith Baptist Church – 35°48′17″N 80°45′13.5″W
- Gays Chapel – 35°48′07.5″N 80°46′17.2″W
- New Salem United Methodist Church – 35°48′18.4″N 80°46′55.4″W
- Oakdale Baptist Church – 35°48′30.5″N 80°48′30.3″W
- Shady Grove Baptist Church – 35°41′57.5″N 80°48′43.4″W
- Shiloh United Methodist Church – 35°43′26″N 80°49′45″W

== Transportation ==
=== Major highways ===
- I-40
- I-77
- US 64
- US 70

== Recreation ==
Chambersburg Township has several public and private places for recreation.

=== Public ===
- Statesville Greenway (part, including two access points)
- Statesville Park and Soccer Complex

== See also ==
- Chambersburg Township, Illinois

== Adjacent townships ==
The United States Census Bureau shows the following townships adjacent to Chambersburg.

- Cool Springs (north)
- Scotch Irish, Rowan County (northeast)
- Cleveland, Rowan County (east)
- Mount Ulla, Rowan County (southeast)
- Barringer (south)
- Statesville Township (west)
- Bethany (northwest)
