= Owen-Harrison House =

Historic house in North Carolina, United States

- U.S. National Register of Historic Places
- Location within North Carolina Location within the United States
- Location: 1420 Sloan Rd, Mount Ulla, NC, near Mill Bridge, North Carolina
- Coordinates: 35°39′10″N 80°39′37″W
- Area: 41 acres (17 ha)
- Built: 1843
- Built by: Rainey, J.W.
- Architectural style: Greek Revival, Federal
- NRHP reference No.: 83001911
- Added to NRHP: July 21, 1983

Owen-Harrison House is a historic plantation house located near Mill Bridge, Rowan County, North Carolina. It was built in 1843, and is a 2 1/2-story, four-bay, double pile brick dwelling with Federal/Greek Revival-style design elements. The front facade has a restored one-story pedimented porch and there are two chimneys on each gable end.

It was listed on the National Register of Historic Places in 1983.
