= Atwell Township, Rowan County, North Carolina =

Township in Rowan County, North Carolina, U.S.

Coordinates: 35.577446°N 80.6992633°W

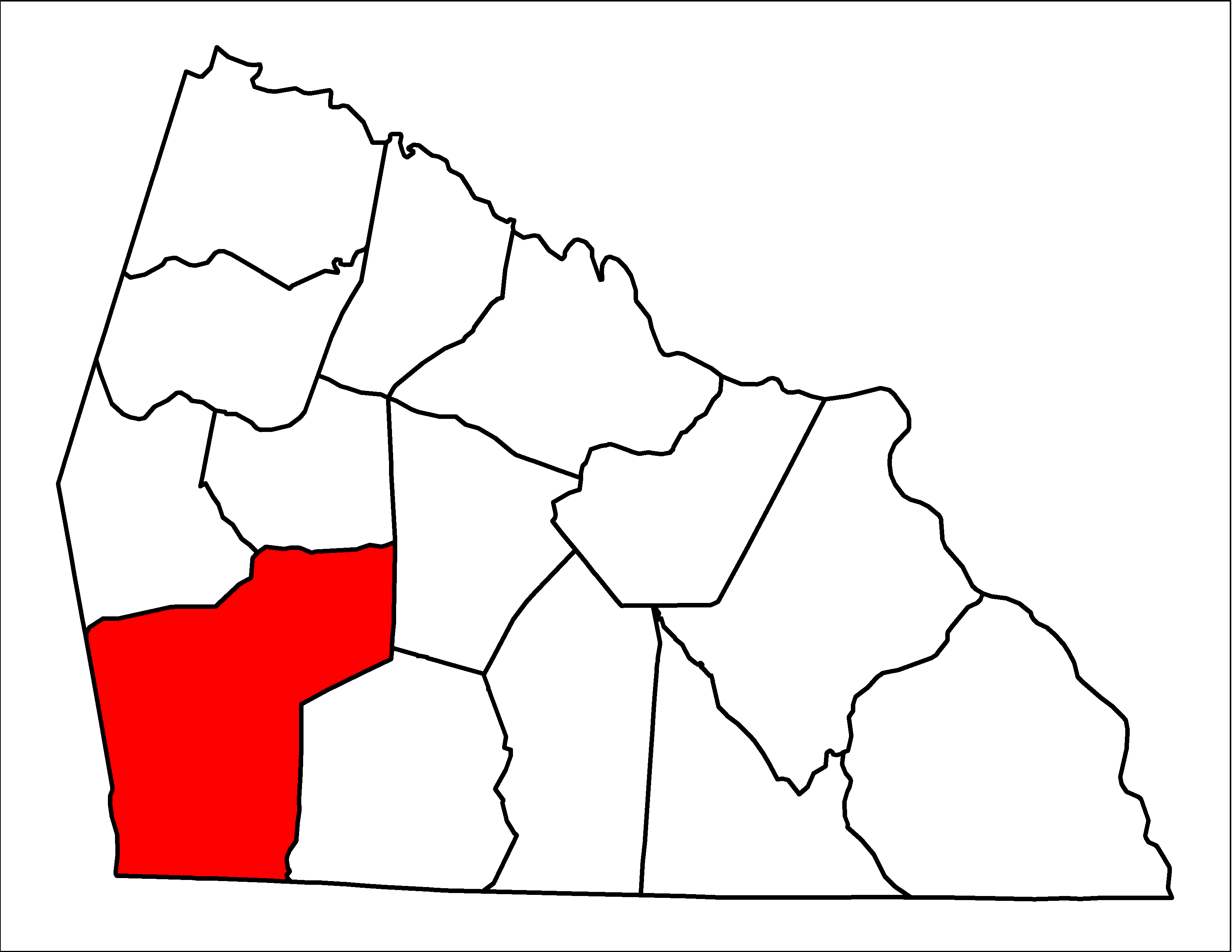
Location of Atwell Township in Rowan County, N.C.

Atwell Township is one of the fourteen townships in Rowan County, North Carolina, United States. The township had a population of 11,226 according to the 2022 census data.

Geographically, Atwell Township covers an area of 60.1 square miles (156 km^{2}) in southwestern Rowan County. There are no incorporated municipalities in Atwell Township; however, there are other unincorporated communities located here, including Enochville. The township's southern boundary is adjacent to Cabarrus County.
