= Chambersburg Township, Pike County, Illinois =

Coordinates: 39°47′56″N 90°38′09″W

Chambersburg Township
- Township
- Location in Pike County

- Pike County's location in Illinois
- Country: United States
- State: Illinois
- County: Pike
- Established: November 8, 1853

Area
  - Total: 29.63 sq mi (76.7 km^{2})
  - Land: 29.09 sq mi (75.3 km^{2})
  - Water: 0.54 sq mi (1.4 km^{2}) 1.82%

Population (2010)
  - Estimate (2016): 195
  - Density: 6.9/sq mi (2.7/km^{2})
- Time zone: UTC-6 (CST)
  - Summer (DST): UTC-5 (CDT)
- FIPS code: 17-149-12359

Chambersburg Township is located in Pike County, Illinois. As of the 2018 census, its population was 241 and it contained 89 housing units.

Chambersburg Township was named for a family of first settlers.

== Geography ==
According to the census conducted in 2018, the township has a total area of 29.63 square miles (76.7 km^{2}), of which 29.09 square miles (75.3 km^{2}) (or 98.18%) is land and 0.54 square miles (1.4 km^{2}) (or 1.82%) is water.

== Population Distribution ==
The township had 138 males and 103 females.

Historical population
Census	Pop.	Note	%±
2016 (est.)	195
U.S. Decennial Census
