= Cleveland, North Carolina =

- Town
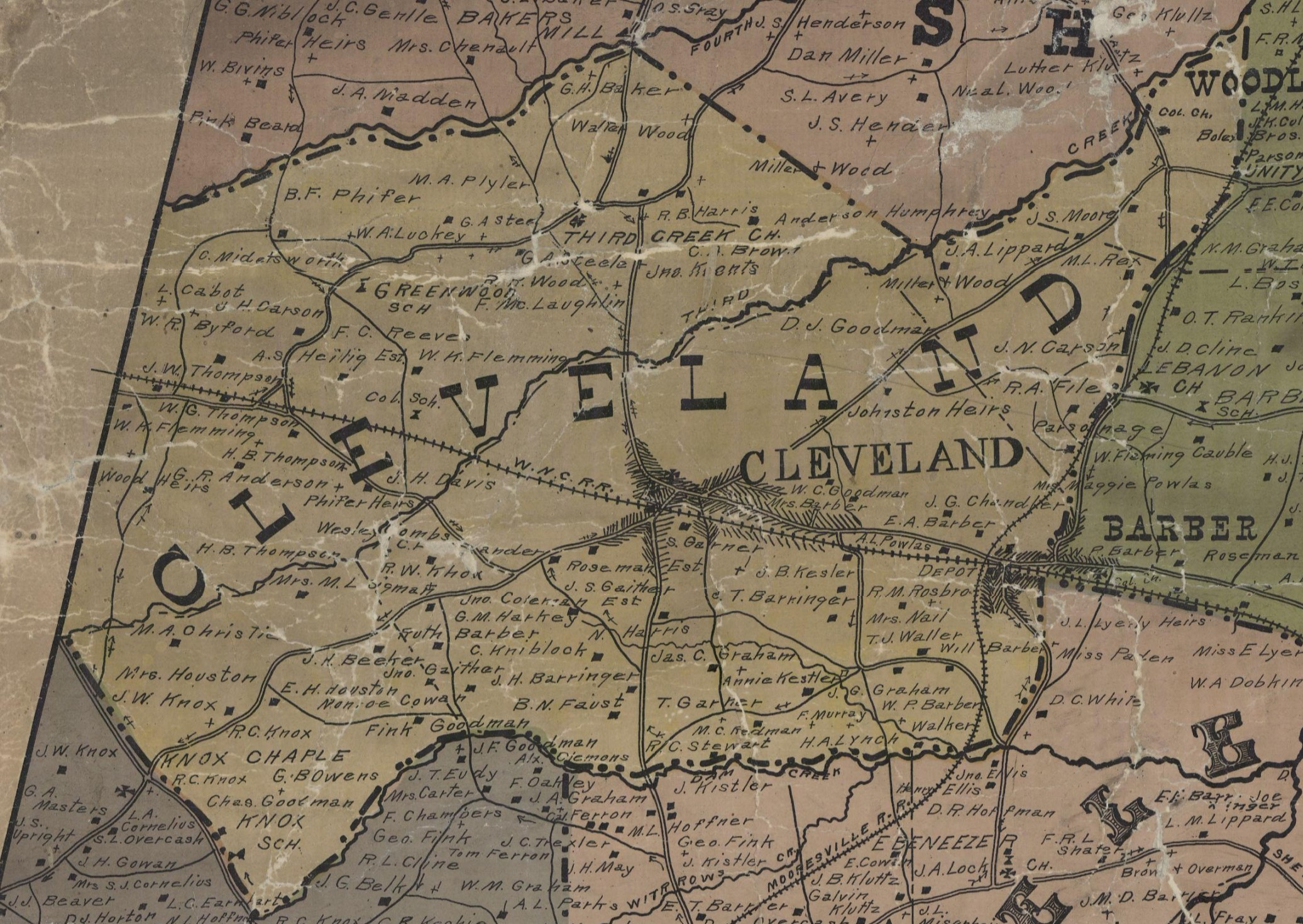
- Cleveland in Cleveland Township

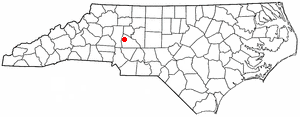
- Location of Cleveland, North Carolina
- Coordinates: 35°43′59″N 80°40′54″W
- Country: United States
- State: North Carolina
- County: Rowan

Area
  - Total: 1.54 sq mi (3.98 km^{2})
  - Land: 1.54 sq mi (3.98 km^{2})
  - Water: 0 sq mi (0.00 km^{2})
- Elevation: 807 ft (246 m)

Population (2020)
  - Total: 846
  - Density: 551.1/sq mi (212.79/km^{2})
- Time zone: UTC-5 (Eastern (EST))
  - Summer (DST): UTC-4 (EDT)
- ZIP code: 27013
- Area codes: 704, 980
- FIPS code: 37-13000
- GNIS feature ID: 2406279
- Website: townofclevelandnc.gov

Cleveland is a town in the Cleveland Township of Rowan County, North Carolina, United States. As of the 2020 census, Cleveland had a population of 846.

== History ==
The town dates from 1831 but was not incorporated until 1833. The first post office in Cleveland—which was named Cowansville at that time—was established on 18 March 1831 with John Cowan the first postmaster. On 7 January 1856, prior to the US Civil War and the completion of the Western Carolina Railroad, the town was renamed to Rowan Mills. Rowan Mills was the name the nearby plantation owned by Osborn Giles Foard. Foard was also the first postmaster of the Rowan Mills Post Office. The Rowan Mills Post Office served the area until 25 February 1884 when it was renamed to Third Creek. In the 1880 U.S. Census, there were 17 families and 89 persons living in the Third Creek community. It was not until 2 March 1887 that the townspeople renamed the town after Grover Cleveland, who is supposed to have visited the town during his presidential campaign. William L. Allison was the first postmaster of both the Third Creek Post Office and the Cleveland Post Office.

== Geography ==
According to the United States Census Bureau, the town has a total area of 1.5 square miles (3.9 km^{2}), all land.

== Demographics ==
Historical population
Census	Pop.	Note	%±
1900	198		—
1910	426		115.2%
1920	366		−14.1%
1930	435		18.9%
1940	506		16.3%
1950	580		14.6%
1960	594		2.4%
1970	614		3.4%
1980	595		−3.1%
1990	696		17.0%
2000	808		16.1%
2010	871		7.8%
2020	846		−2.9%
U.S. Decennial Census

=== 2020 census ===
Cleveland racial composition
Race	Number	Percentage
White (non-Hispanic)	527	62.29%
Black or African American (non-Hispanic)	191	22.58%
Native American	1	0.12%
Asian	4	0.47%
Pacific Islander	1	0.12%
Other/Mixed	65	7.68%
Hispanic or Latino	57	6.74%

As of the 2020 United States census, there were 846 people, 392 households, and 283 families residing in the town.

=== 2010 census ===
As of the census of 2010, there were 871 people, 328 households, and 236 families residing in the town. The population density was 580.7 inhabitants per square mile (224.2/km^{2}). There were 377 housing units at an average density of 251.3 per square mile (97.0/km^{2}). The racial makeup of the town was 66.9% White, 24.1% African American, 5.4% from other races, and 3.6% from two or more races. Hispanic or Latino of any race were 6.5% of the population.

There were 328 households, out of which 34.1% had children under the age of 18 living with them, 47.6% were married couples living together, 16.5% had a female householder with no husband present, and 28.0% were non-families. 24.1% of all households were made up of individuals, and 9.4% had someone living alone who was 65 years of age or older. The average household size was 2.66 and the average family size was 3.10.

In the town, the population was spread out, with 28.4% under the age of 18, 7.2% from 18 to 24, 29.3% from 25 to 44, 23.4% from 45 to 64, and 11.7% who were 65 years of age or older. The median age was 34.8 years. For every 100 females, there were 95.3 males. For every 100 females age 18 and over, there were 90.2 males.

The median income for a household in the town was $39,474, and the median income for a family was $58,000. Males had a median income of $51,000 versus $29,500 for females. The per capita income for the town was $19,506. About 13.1% of families and 20.5% of the population were below the poverty line, including 25.0% of those under age 18 and 8.9% of those age 65 or over.

== Town twinning / sister city ==
Since February 8, 2008, Cleveland has been twinned with Killyleagh, Northern Ireland.

== Notable people ==
- Bobby Dale Earnhardt, motor racing driver

== See also ==
- Cleveland Township
- 2007 Freightliner wildcat strike
