= Dunbar School =

Dunbar School may refer to:

- Dunbar School (Phoenix, Arizona)
- Dunbar School (Tucson, Arizona)
- Dunbar Magnet Middle School, in Little Rock, Arkansas
- Dunbar School (Ardmore, Oklahoma), listed on the National Register of Historic Places (NRHP) in Carter County, Oklahoma
- Dunbar School (Elsemere, Kentucky) (later Wilkins Heights School)
- Dunbar Public School, in Loudon, Tennessee, listed on the NRHP in Loudon County, Tennessee
- Paul Laurence Dunbar High School (Fort Worth, Texas)
- Dunbar School (East Spencer, North Carolina)
- Dunbar School (Fairmont, West Virginia)
- Dunbar High School (Washington, D.C.)

== See also ==
- Paul Lawrence Dunbar School (disambiguation)
- Dunbar High School (disambiguation)
