= East Spencer, North Carolina =

- Town
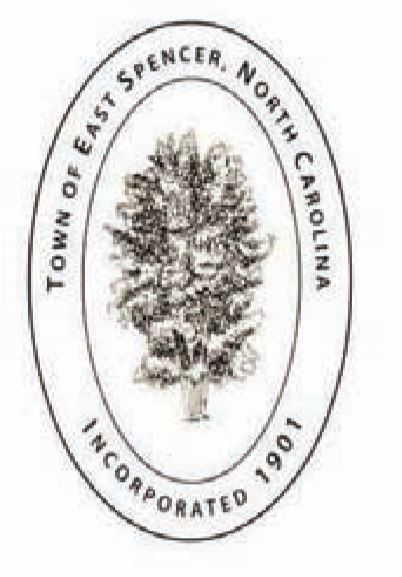
- Seal

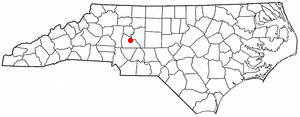
- Location of East Spencer, North Carolina
- Coordinates: 35°40′54″N 80°25′22″W
- Country: United States
- State: North Carolina
- County: Rowan

Area
  - Total: 2.11 sq mi (5.46 km^{2})
  - Land: 2.11 sq mi (5.46 km^{2})
  - Water: 0 sq mi (0.00 km^{2})
- Elevation: 696 ft (212 m)

Population (2020)
  - Total: 1,567
  - Density: 743.5/sq mi (287.08/km^{2})
- Time zone: UTC-5 (Eastern (EST))
  - Summer (DST): UTC-4 (EDT)
- ZIP code: 28039
- Area code: 704
- FIPS code: 37-19860
- GNIS feature ID: 2406415
- Website: https://eastspencer.gov/

East Spencer is a town in Rowan County, North Carolina, United States. As of the 2020 census, East Spencer had a population of 1,567. Originally called "Southern City" because of significance of the railway to the area, it was incorporated in 1901 as East Spencer. It was named for the Spencer shops that opened in the area in 1896.

== Geography ==
East Spencer is located adjacent to and south of the town of Spencer, North Carolina. The Southern Railway tracks separate the two towns.

According to the United States Census Bureau, the town has a total area of 1.6 square miles (4.1 km^{2}), all land.

== Government ==
The town of East Spencer is governed by a mayor and six board of alderman members. The mayor serves a two-year term and the board members serve staggered four-year terms. The board of alderman selects a town manager, who conducts the business of the Town, supervise staff, manages finances, prepares meetings and assists the town as needed.

A post office was first established in East Spencer on February 12, 1919, with William J. Hatley as postmaster.

== Demographics ==
Historical population
Census	Pop.	Note	%±
1910	1,729		—
1920	2,239		29.5%
1930	2,098		−6.3%
1940	2,181		4.0%
1950	2,444		12.1%
1960	2,171		−11.2%
1970	2,217		2.1%
1980	2,150		−3.0%
1990	2,055		−4.4%
2000	1,755		−14.6%
2010	1,534		−12.6%
2020	1,567		2.2%
U.S. Decennial Census

=== 2020 census ===
East Spencer racial composition
Race	Number	Percentage
White (non-Hispanic)	233	14.87%
Black or African American (non-Hispanic)	1,078	68.79%
Native American	6	0.38%
Asian	7	0.45%
Pacific Islander	4	0.26%
Other/Mixed	86	5.49%
Hispanic or Latino	153	9.76%

As of the 2020 census, East Spencer had a population of 1,567. The median age was 36.0 years. 29.6% of residents were under the age of 18 and 14.7% of residents were 65 years of age or older. For every 100 females there were 91.1 males, and for every 100 females age 18 and over there were 82.0 males age 18 and over.

98.2% of residents lived in urban areas, while 1.8% lived in rural areas.

There were 653 households in East Spencer, including 287 family households. Of all households, 36.1% had children under the age of 18 living in them, 21.3% were married-couple households, 25.6% were households with a male householder and no spouse or partner present, and 45.9% were households with a female householder and no spouse or partner present. About 33.3% of all households were made up of individuals, and 11.8% had someone living alone who was 65 years of age or older.

There were 784 housing units, of which 16.7% were vacant. The homeowner vacancy rate was 5.2% and the rental vacancy rate was 11.8%.

=== 2000 census ===
As of the census of 2000, there were 1,755 people, 697 households, and 450 families residing in the town. The population density was 1,115.3 inhabitants per square mile (430.6/km^{2}). There were 796 housing units at an average density of 505.8 per square mile (195.3/km^{2}). The racial makeup of the town was 11.79% White, 85.81% African American, 0.17% Native American, 0.06% Asian, 0.06% Pacific Islander, 0.91% from other races, and 1.20% from two or more races. Hispanic or Latino of any race were 2.74% of the population.

There were 697 households, out of which 35.2% had children under the age of 18 living with them, 25.1% were married couples living together, 34.1% had a female householder with no husband present, and 35.4% were non-families. 32.1% of all households were made up of individuals, and 12.8% had someone living alone who was 65 years of age or older. The average household size was 2.52 and the average family size was 3.18.

In the town, the population was spread out, with 33.8% under the age of 18, 8.7% from 18 to 24, 25.5% from 25 to 44, 20.2% from 45 to 64, and 11.7% who were 65 years of age or older. The median age was 30 years. For every 100 females, there were 80.0 males. For every 100 females age 18 and over, there were 73.8 males.

The median income for a household in the town was $18,947, and the median income for a family was $22,222. Males had a median income of $23,203 versus $21,801 for females. The per capita income for the town was $10,180. About 32.2% of families and 35.8% of the population were below the poverty line, including 47.4% of those under age 18 and 27.5% of those age 65 or over.

== Schools ==
- East Spencer Negro School was established in East Spencer in 1900. It was originally a one room school with a major expansion in 1921 to include an 11-classroom building. In 1958, it was renamed Dunbar High School, named for the poet Paul Laurence Dunbar. In the 1990s, it ceased to become a school and was renamed the Paul Laurence Community Center. It continued to be owned by the school system until 2006 when it was sold. The building was destroyed by fire in 2015.
- Essie Mae Kiser Foxx Charter School: This charter school was named for a prominent community leader in East Spencer. It opened in August 2018 as a free, community-centric public school of choice with grades kindergarten through four and plans to add a grade each year until grades kindergarten through eighth grade are included. The enrollment is 150 students.

== Churches ==
The following religious organizations are located in East Spencer:

- East Spencer Baptist Church
- Faith Temple Triumphant Ministries, Inc.
- Long Street Methodist-Episcopal Church
- North Carolina-Virginia Primitive Baptist State Convention Worship and Conference Center
- Shady Grove Baptist Church
- Solid Rock Baptist Church
- Southern City AME Zion Church
- The Guiding Light Baptist Association
- Word of God Street Ministry

== Notable people ==
- Javon Hargrave, American football player
- Bobby Jackson (1973– ), NBA guard
- Carl Torbush, American football coach

== See also ==
- Spencer, North Carolina
- Samuel Spencer (railroad executive)
