= Dunbar High School =

Dunbar High School may refer to:

- Dunbar High School (Bessemer, Alabama) in Bessemer, Alabama
- Dunbar High School (East Spencer, North Carolina) in East Spencer, North Carolina
- Dunbar High School (Little Rock, Arkansas) in Little Rock, Arkansas
- Dunbar High School (Dayton, Ohio) in Dayton, Ohio
- Dunbar High School (Fort Myers, Florida) in Fort Myers, Florida
- Dunbar High School (Livingston, Texas) in Livingston, Texas
- Dunbar High School in Quincy, Florida
- Dunbar High School (Washington, D.C.) in Washington, D.C.
- Dunbar Vocational High School in Chicago, Illinois
- Paul Laurence Dunbar High School (Baltimore, Maryland) in Baltimore, Maryland

== See also ==
- Dunbar School (disambiguation)
- Paul Lawrence Dunbar School (disambiguation)
