= Gil Robinson =

American football player (1910–1985)

No. 25
- Position: End

Personal information
- Born: April 18, 1910; Spencer, North Carolina, U.S.
- Died: July 11, 1985 (aged 75); Hemet, California, U.S.
- Listed height: 6 ft 0 in (1.83 m)
- Listed weight: 180 lb (82 kg)

Career information
- High school: Spencer (North Carolina)
- College: Catawba

Career history
- Pittsburgh Pirates (1933)
- Stats at Pro Football Reference

Gilmer George Robinson (April 18, 1910 – July 11, 1985) was an American professional football end who played one season with the Pittsburgh Pirates of the National Football League (NFL). He played college football at Catawba College.

== Early life ==
Gilmer George Robinson was born on April 18, 1910, in Spencer, North Carolina. He played three sports at Spencer High School, and graduated in 1929.

== College career ==
Robinson played college football for the Catawba Indians of Catawba College as an end. He played 1,140 consecutive minutes in 19 games during his final two years at Catawba. He played 2,100 minutes in total during his college career, only missing one game during his sophomore year due to a hip injury suffered in practice. Robinson was also substituted for one minute of game action as a freshman. He was a team captain at Catawba.

Robinson played guard on the Catawba basketball team and was a team captain. He played baseball at Catawba as well. Overall, he earned 13 varsity letters at the college; four in football, four in basketball, four in baseball, and one in tennis. Robinson graduated in 1933.

== Professional career ==
Robinson played in one game for the Pittsburgh Pirates of the National Football League during the team's inaugural 1933 season. He wore jersey number 25 while with the Pirates. He stood 6'0" and weighed 180 pounds.

== Personal life ==
Robinson later enrolled at George Williams College to in order to earn a physical education degree. In 1936, he was one of 30 American students chosen by the American Olympic Committee and the American Academy of Physical Education to be guests of the Nazi German government at a physical education congress held in Berlin two weeks before the 1936 Summer Olympics. The 30 students sailed to Berlin with the American Olympic team and afterwards visited Switzerland, France, and England.

In 1937, Robinson was named director of intramural athletics and a freshman football coach at the University of Michigan. He died on July 11, 1985, in Hemet, California.
