= Paul Laurence Dunbar School =

Paul Laurence Dunbar School may refer to:

- Paul Laurence Dunbar High School (Baltimore, Maryland)
- Paul Laurence Dunbar School (Fort Myers, Florida)
- Paul Laurence Dunbar High School (Fort Worth, Texas)
- Paul Laurence Dunbar High School (Lexington, Kentucky)
- Paul Laurence Dunbar School (Philadelphia)
- Paul Laurence Dunbar High School (Simmesport, Louisiana)
- M Street High School in Washington D.C.
- Dunbar High School (Washington, D.C.)

== See also ==
- Paul Laurence Dunbar (1872–1906), American writer
- Dunbar School (disambiguation)
- Dunbar High School (disambiguation)
