= Javon Hargrave =

American football player (born 1993)

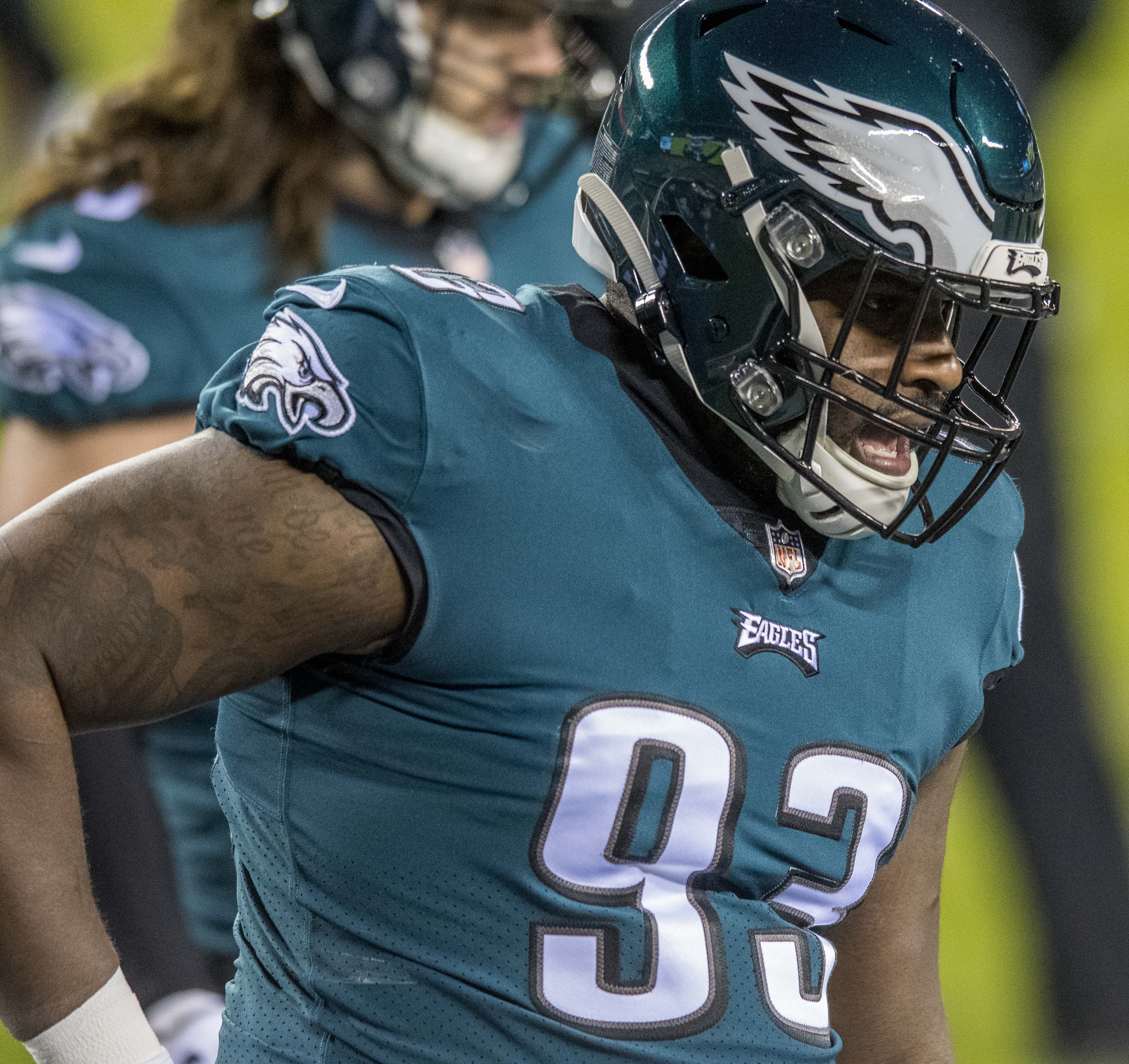
- Hargrave with the Philadelphia Eagles in 2021

No. 98 – Green Bay Packers
- Position: Defensive tackle
- Roster status: Injured reserve

Personal information
- Born: February 7, 1993 (age 33); Salisbury, North Carolina, U.S.
- Listed height: 6 ft 2 in (1.88 m)
- Listed weight: 307 lb (139 kg)

Career information
- High school: North Rowan (Spencer, North Carolina)
- College: South Carolina State (2012–2015)
- NFL draft: 2016: 3rd round, 89th overall pick

Career history
- Pittsburgh Steelers (2016–2019); Philadelphia Eagles (2020–2022); San Francisco 49ers (2023–2024); Minnesota Vikings (2025); Green Bay Packers (2026–present)

Awards and highlights
- 2× Pro Bowl (2021, 2023); Black College Football Pro Player of the Year Award (2020); 2× First-team All-MEAC (2014, 2015)

Career NFL statistics as of 2026
- Total tackles: 438
- Sacks: 49.0
- Forced fumbles: 5
- Fumble recoveries: 5
- Pass deflections: 9
- Defensive touchdowns: 1
- Stats at Pro Football Reference

Javon DeAndre Hargrave (/ˈdʒeɪvɒn/ JAY-von; born February 7, 1993) is an American professional football defensive tackle for the Green Bay Packers of the National Football League (NFL). He played college football for the South Carolina State Bulldogs and he was selected by the Pittsburgh Steelers in the third round of the 2016 NFL draft.

== College career ==
Hargrave began attending South Carolina State University in 2011 where he redshirted as a true freshman. As a redshirt freshman with the Bulldogs in 2012, he finished with 45 tackles and 4.5 tackles for a loss.

The following season, he had 12.5 tackles for a loss and 3.5 sacks.

On October 25, 2014, he tied a Football Championship Subdivision (FCS) record after finishing with a total of 6 sacks against Bethune-Cookman. He finished third among the FCS with 16 sacks as a junior in 2014 and was named a first-team All-Mid-Eastern Athletic Conference (MEAC).

In the 2015 season opener he made 6 solo tackles, 4.5 tackles for losses, and 2.5 sacks in a 35–7 victory against Arkansas-Pine Bluff. On September 16, 2015, he made 3 tackles and 2.5 tackles for a loss in a 36–0 shutout of Florida A&M. On October 3, 2015, he had 10 tackles and a sack in a loss to Furman. On October 24, 2015, Hargrave had one of his best games of the season, finishing with 6 solo tackles, 8 total tackles, 4 tackles for losses, forced a fumble, and had 3 sacks against Delaware State. In Week 11, he again had a season-high 3 sacks, 7 tackles, and 4 tackles for losses in a victory over Norfolk State. In his last career collegiate game he made a total of 4 tackles, 2 sacks, and a forced fumble in a win over Savannah State. He finished his last season with South Carolina State with 45 solo tackles, 59 total tackles, 22 tackles for losses, 13.5 sacks, and 2 forced fumbles. For the second consecutive season he was named a First-team All-MEAC.

== Professional career ==
=== Pre-draft ===
On January 23, 2016, Hargrave participated in the 2016 East–West Shrine Game and raised his draft stock with a good performance. Hargrave was invited to the NFL Scouting Combine and participated in all workouts and positional drills. At South Carolina State's Pro Day, he stood on his combine numbers and only did positional drills. Representatives and scouts from 23 NFL teams attended his Pro Day and four defensive line coaches from the Cincinnati Bengals, Pittsburgh Steelers, Philadelphia Eagles, and Tennessee Titans also came to watch Hargrave, along with 14 other prospects. Although analysts and scouts gave him positive reviews for his motor, playmaking ability, quick footwork, athleticism, and strength they also criticized him for his short arms, stocky frame, small hands, lack of instincts, and also considered him a raw talent. At the conclusion of the pre-draft process, Hargrave was projected by many analysts as a third or fourth round selection. He was ranked as the 11th best defensive tackle prospect in the draft by NFLDraftScout.com.

Pre-draft measurables
Height	Weight	Arm length	Hand span	Wingspan	40-yard dash	10-yard split	20-yard split	20-yard shuttle	Three-cone drill	Vertical jump	Broad jump	Bench press
6 ft 1 3/8 in (1.86 m)	309 lb (140 kg)	32 in (0.81 m)	9 5/8 in (0.24 m)	6 ft 6 in (1.98 m)	4.93 s	1.70 s	2.85 s	4.70 s	7.90 s	34.5 in (0.88 m)	9 ft 1 in (2.77 m)	29 reps
All values from NFL Combine

=== Pittsburgh Steelers ===
==== 2016 ====
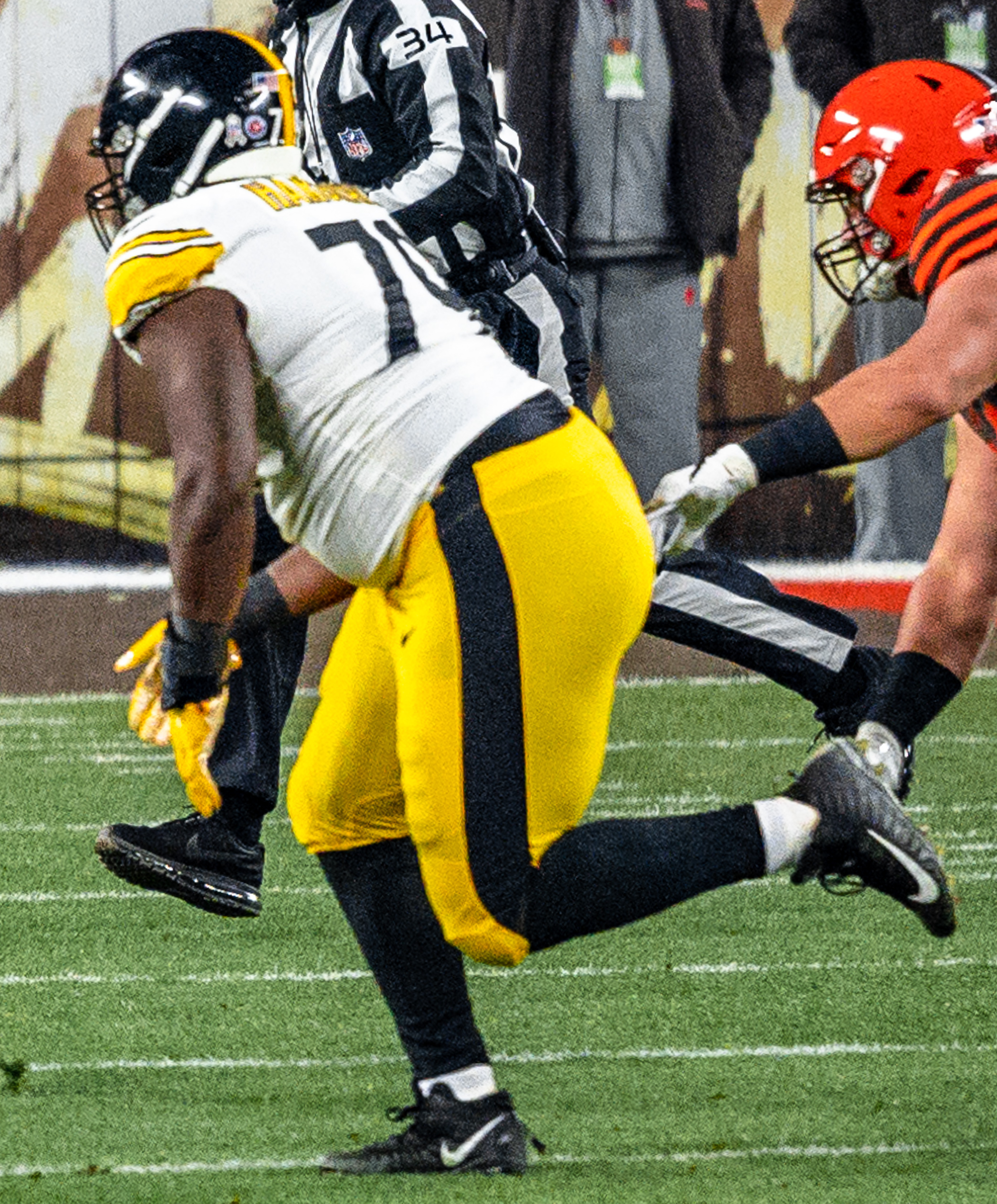
Hargrave with the Pittsburgh Steelers in 2019

The Steelers selected Hargrave in the third round (89th overall) of the 2016 NFL draft.

On June 10, 2016, the Steelers signed him to a four-year, $3.114 million rookie contract with a $693,000 signing bonus. Hargrave was the last player of the Steelers' 2016 draft class to sign a contract with the Steelers.

After competing with fellow nose tackle Daniel McCullers in training camp and the preseason, Hargrave won the starting job as the starting nose tackle to begin the 2016 season.

He made his professional regular season debut during Steelers' season-opener at the Washington Redskins and helped them win 38–16. The following game, Hargrave made his first career start and recorded his first career tackle in a 24–16 victory over the Bengals. On November 20, 2016, Hargrave scored his first career NFL touchdown after Ryan Shazier stripped Cleveland Browns quarterback Josh McCown. During the Steelers' victory he recorded his first career sack on McCown and also finished with a tackle. The next game, Hargrave five total tackles in the Steelers' 28–7 victory over the Indianapolis Colts. On December 4, 2016, he suffered a concussion during a victory over the New York Giants and was inactive the following game against the Buffalo Bills. He finished the 2016 season with 27 combined tackle (18 solo), two sacks, and one touchdown in 13 starts and 15 games.

The Steelers received a playoff berth after finishing atop the American Football Conference (AFC) North with an 11–5 record. On January 8, 2017, Hargrave started his first career playoff game and recorded one tackle, as the Steelers routed the Miami Dolphins 30–12 in the AFC Wild Card Round. After defeating the Kansas City Chiefs in the Divisional Round, the Steelers went on to face the New England Patriots in the AFC Championship. Hargrave made five combined tackles as the Steelers lost 17–36 to the eventual Super Bowl LI Champions.

==== 2017 ====
Hargrave returned as the starting nose tackle to start the 2017 season after winning the job over Daniel McCullers and Roy Philon. He started the Steelers' season-opener against the Browns and made three solo tackles and sacked DeShone Kizer in the Steelers' 21–18 victory. On October 8, 2017, Hargrave recorded a career-high ten total tackles in a 30–9 loss to the Jacksonville Jaguars. He finished the 2017 season with two sacks, 32 total tackles, one pass defended, and one forced fumble in 16 games and 12 starts.

==== 2018 ====
In week 11 against the Jacksonville Jaguars, Hargrave recorded four tackles, two sacks, and one pass defended as the Steelers won 20–16. Hargrave finished the season with 41 tackles, six sacks, and one pass defended.

==== 2019 ====
In week 4 against the Bengals, Hargrave recorded his first sack of the season on Andy Dalton in the 27–3 win. In week 10 against the Los Angeles Rams, Hargrave recorded a strip sack on Jared Goff which was recovered by teammate Minkah Fitzpatrick who returned it for a 43 yard touchdown in the 17–12 win. He finished the 2019 season with four sacks, 60 total tackles (35 solo), and one forced fumble in 16 games and 13 starts.

=== Philadelphia Eagles ===
==== 2020 ====
On March 21, 2020, Hargrave signed a three-year $39 million contract with the Eagles. On August 17, it was reported that Hargrave was dealing with a pectoral injury which ultimately would force him to miss week 1, but he returned the following week and played in the remaining 15 games for the Eagles. In week 14 against the Saints, Hargrave recorded 2 sacks on Taysom Hill and recovered a fumble forced by Josh Sweat in the 24–21 win. He finished the season playing in 15 games, starting 11 of them.

==== 2021 ====
Before the season, Hargrave changed his jersey number to #97 (the number he wore in college) which became available after the departure of Malik Jackson.

In Week 1 of the Eagles season, Hargrave recorded two sacks on Matt Ryan in the 32–6 win against the Falcons. During Week 3 against the Cowboys, Hargrave recorded two sacks on Dak Prescott which included a forced fumble in the endzone which was recovered by Fletcher Cox for a touchdown. Hargrave started 16 games, while only missing the final game where all of the Eagles starters were benched. Hargrave had the best season of his career in 2021, as he ended the year with career high totals in sacks (7.5), combined tackles (63), and quarterback hits (18).

In the Wild Card game against the Buccaneers, Hargrave recorded four tackles, two quarterback hits and a sack on Tom Brady in the 31–15 loss. As a result of his breakout campaign, Hargrave was announced as the injury replacement for Kenny Clark in the 2022 Pro Bowl.

==== 2022 ====
In 2022, Hargrave recorded 60 tackles, 11 sacks, one forced fumble, and two fumble recoveries. Hargrave helped the Eagles reach Super Bowl LVII. In the Super Bowl, Hargrave recorded five tackles, but the Eagles lost 38–35 to the Chiefs.

=== San Francisco 49ers ===
On March 16, 2023, Hargrave signed a four-year, $84 million contract with the San Francisco 49ers. In the 2023 season, Hargrave finished with seven sacks, 44 total tackles (25 solo), and two passes defended in 16 games and starts. In Super Bowl LVIII, Hargrave recorded one sack, one fumble recovery, and six total tackles in the 25–22 overtime loss to the Chiefs.

Three games into the 2024 season, Hargrave partially tore his right triceps during the 49ers' loss to the Los Angeles Rams, an injury requiring surgery which ended his season.

On March 12, 2025, Hargrave was released by the 49ers.

=== Minnesota Vikings ===
On March 12, 2025, Hargrave signed a two-year, $30 million contract with the Minnesota Vikings. In the 2025 season, he finished with 3.5 sacks, 52 total tackles, one forced fumble, and one fumble recovery. On March 11, 2026, Hargrave was released by the Vikings.

=== Green Bay Packers ===
On March 11, 2026, Hargrave signed a two-year, $23 million contract with the Green Bay Packers. On October 11, 2026, he suffered a season-ending torn Achilles during a week 5 win over the Chicago Bears, and had to be carted off the field. The Packers placed him on injured reserve six days later.

== Career statistics ==
=== NFL ===
Legend
	Led the league
**Bold**	Career high

==== Regular season ====
Year	Team	Games		Tackles					Interceptions						Fumbles			
Year	Team	GP	GS	Cmb	Solo	Ast	Sck	Sfty	PD	Int	Yds	Avg	Lng	TD	FF	FR	Yds	TD
2016	PIT	15	13	14	15	16	2.0	–	0	–	–	–	–	–	0	1	0	**1**
2017	PIT	16	12	32	21	11	2.0	–	1	–	–	–	–	–	**1**	0	0	0
2018	PIT	16	14	49	32	17	6.5	–	1	–	–	–	–	–	–	–	–	–
2019	PIT	16	13	60	35	25	4.0	–	0	–	–	–	–	–	**1**	0	0	0
2020	PHI	15	11	38	16	22	4.5	–	1	–	–	–	–	–	0	1	0	0
2021	PHI	16	16	**63**	27	**36**	7.5	–	1	–	–	–	–	–	**1**	0	0	0
2022	PHI	**17**	**17**	60	**37**	23	**11.0**	–	**2**	–	–	–	–	–	**1**	**2**	0	0
2023	SF	16	16	44	25	19	7.5	–	**2**	–	–	–	–	–	–	–	–	–
2024	SF	3	3	7	4	3	1.0	–	0	–	–	–	–	–	–	–	–	–
2025	MIN	16	15	52	18	34	3.5	–	0	–	–	–	–	–	**1**	1	0	0
2026	GB	4	0	6	2	4	0.0	–	1	–	–	–	–	–	0	0	0	0
Career		150	130	438	235	203	49.0	0	9	0	0	0.0	0	0	5	5	0	1

==== Postseason ====
Year	Team	Games		Tackles					Interceptions						Fumbles			
Year	Team	GP	GS	Cmb	Solo	Ast	Sck	Sfty	PD	Int	Yds	Avg	Lng	TD	FF	FR	Yds	TD
2016	PIT	**3**	**3**	8	4	4	**1.0**	–	0	–	–	–	–	–	–	–	–	–
2017	PIT	1	1	1	1	0	0.0	–	0	–	–	–	–	–	–	–	–	–
2021	PHI	1	1	4	0	4	**1.0**	–	0	–	–	–	–	–	–	–	–	–
2022	PHI	**3**	**3**	9	**6**	3	**1.0**	–	**1**	–	–	–	–	–	–	–	–	–
2023	SF	**3**	**3**	**10**	4	**6**	**1.0**	–	0	–	–	–	–	–	0	**1**	0	0
Career		11	11	32	15	17	4.0	0	1	0	0	0.0	0	0	0	1	0	0

=== College ===
South Carolina State Bulldogs
Season	GP	Cmb	Solo	Ast	TfL	Sck	FF	FR
2012	11	45	26	19	4.5	2.0	0	0
2013	11	51	27	24	12.5	5.5	3	1
2014	12	55	47	8	24	16.0	3	1
2015	11	59	43	16	22	13.5	2	0
Total	45	210	143	67	63.0	37.0	8	2
