= North Rowan High School =

American public school in North Carolina

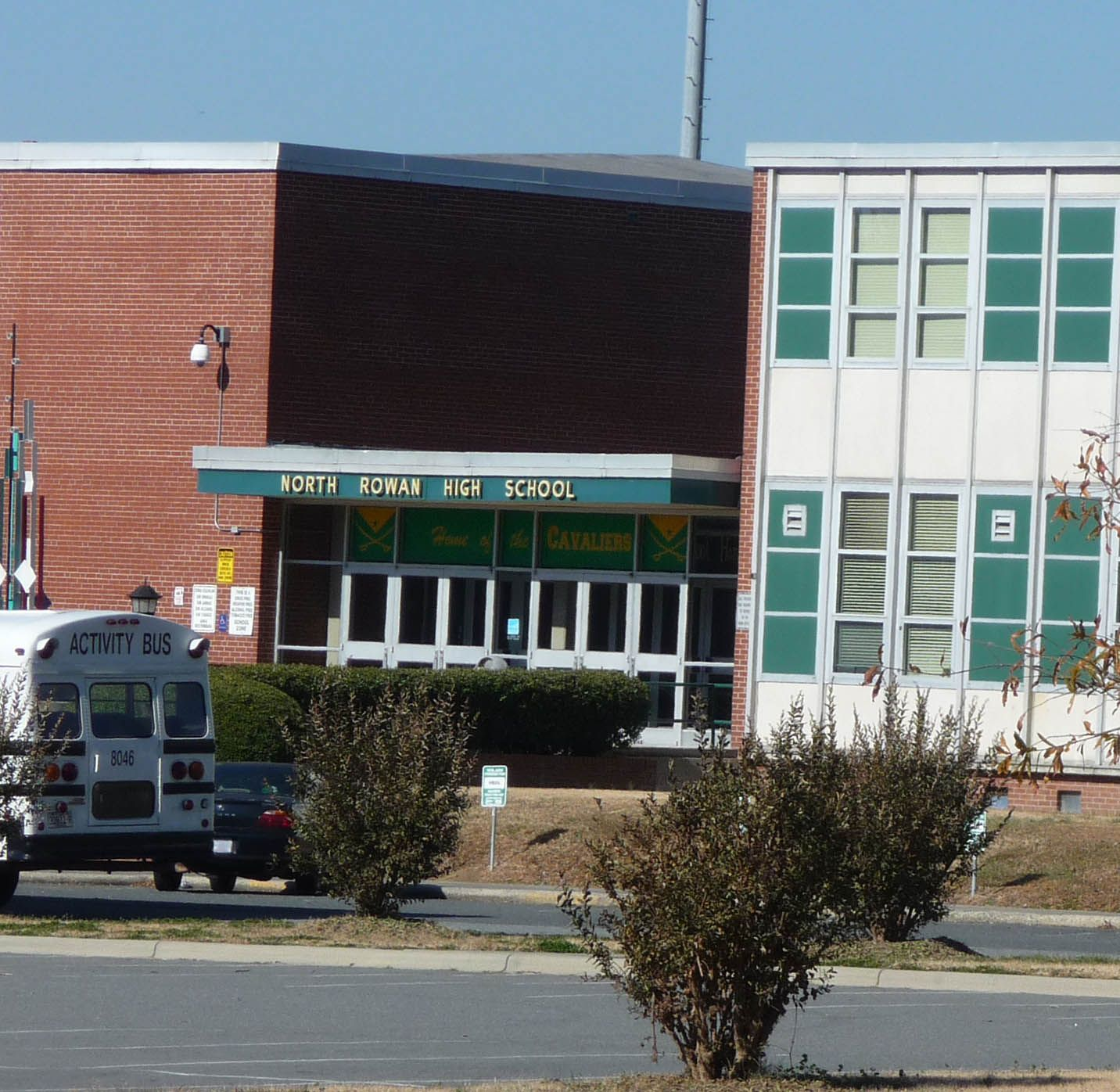
- North Rowan High School entrance

Location
- 300 North Whitehead Avenue; Spencer, North Carolina 28159; United States; 35°41′50″N 80°25′47″W

Information
- Type: Public
- Founded: 1958 (68 years ago)
- CEEB code: 343705
- NCES School ID: 370405001625
- Principal: Michael White
- Teaching staff: 38.11 (FTE)
- Enrollment: 592 (2023-2024)
- Student to teacher ratio: 15.53
- Schedule type: Block, 4-period
- Colors: Kelly green, white, and gold
- Athletics: NCHSAA 2A
- Athletics conference: Yadkin Valley 2A/3A
- Mascot: Cavaliers
- Website: nrhs.rssed.org

North Rowan High School, formerly Spencer High School and East Spencer High School, is located in the north eastern end of Rowan County in Spencer, North Carolina. It is part of the Rowan–Salisbury School System.

== History ==
=== Establishment ===
In the spring of 1959, North Rowan High School was accredited by the Southern Association of Secondary Schools and Colleges. The first principal of North Rowan was Johnson H. Steelman. Camden was the second.

=== The James Carr Eagle Athletic Field ===
On August 4, 1958, the Rowan County Board voted unanimously to name the North Rowan High School athletic field "The James Carr Eagle Athletic Field". On September 21, 1958, the building was dedicated with Dr. Charles Carroll, State Superintendent of Public Instruction, as speaker at the ceremonies.

== Scholarship ==
Begun in 2001 by the Class of 1973, the North Rowan Alumni Memorial Scholarship has assisted nine outstanding graduates with college expenses. These students are currently enrolled in college. The campaign goal is to create a fund of $500,000.00 from which the earnings will be used to fund a full four-year tuition scholarship for a graduate of North Rowan High School deemed worthy.

== Controversies ==
In May 2012, a social studies teacher by the name of Tanya Dixon-Neely was suspended for telling a student not to disrespect President Barack Obama, claiming that "criticism of the president could lead to jail time."

== Notable alumni ==
- Javon Hargrave (2011), NFL defensive tackle, 2-time Pro Bowl selection

== See also ==
- Dunbar High School (East Spencer, North Carolina)
