= Spencer Historic District =

Historic district in North Carolina, United States

- U.S. National Register of Historic Places
- U.S. Historic district
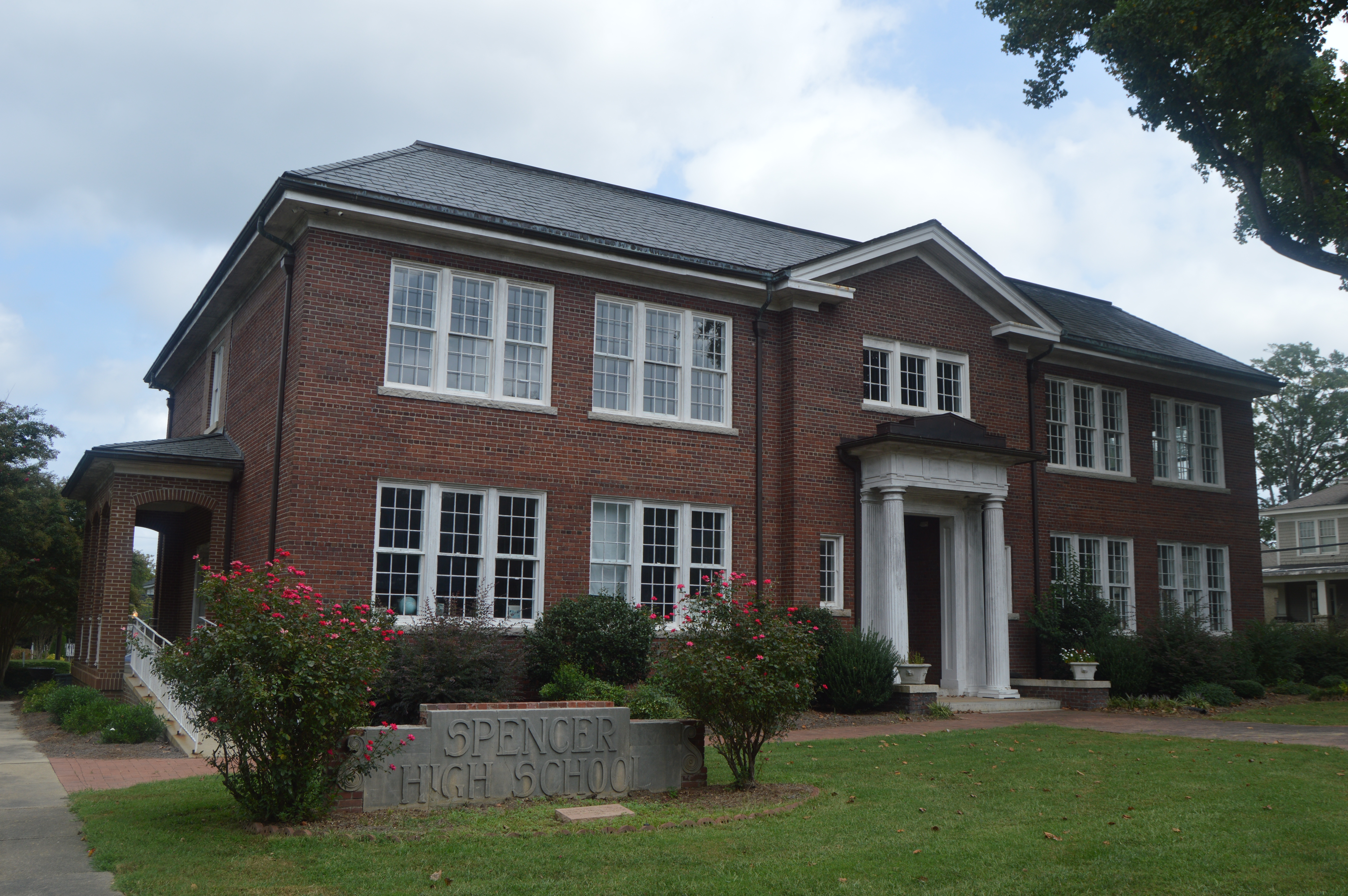
- Town Library and former high school

- Location within North Carolina Location within the United States
- Location: Roughly bounded by N to S Salisbury Ave., 8th St., Whitehead Ave., and Jefferson St., Spencer, North Carolina
- Coordinates: 35°41′32″N 80°26′04″W
- Area: 120 acres (49 ha)
- Built: c. 1902
- Architect: Multiple
- Architectural style: Bungalow/craftsman, Queen Anne, L-plan;Triple-A;foursquare
- NRHP reference No.: 84000619
- Added to NRHP: December 20, 1984

Spencer Historic District is a national historic district located at Spencer, Rowan County, North Carolina. The district encompasses 242 contributing buildings in the central business district and surrounding residential sections of Spencer. It largely developed between about 1902 and 1937, and includes notable examples of Queen Anne style architecture. Notable buildings include Cooke's Drug Store (c. 1902), the Julian Building (c. 1902), Wachovia-First National Bank Building (1903), Arey Building (1908), First Baptist Church (1926), Presbyterian Church (1903). Central Methodist Church (1921), Spencer Library (1913), Spencer Town Hall (1937), the John Hatley House (1901), and the Morrison House (c. 1910).

It was listed on the National Register of Historic Places in 1984.
