= Alexander Long House =

Historic house in North Carolina, United States

- U.S. National Register of Historic Places
- Location within North Carolina Location within the United States
- Location: N of Spencer on Sowers Ferry Rd., near Spencer, North Carolina
- Coordinates: 35°42′10″N 80°25′13″W
- Area: 36 acres (15 ha)
- Built: 1783
- NRHP reference No.: 72000995
- Added to NRHP: February 1, 1972

Alexander Long House is a historic plantation home located near Spencer, Rowan County, North Carolina. Alexander Long, the original owner of the home, owned the ferry that crossed the Yadkin River one mile east of the home's location. The property was built in about 1783 and once boasted a 2,500 acre spread. It was listed on the National Register of Historic Places in 1972.

The home's wide granite foundation supports the hand-hewn four story frame, which is sheathed in plain lapped siding over beaded weatherboard. The roof is a hand-split cedar shake gable roof. Seven fireplaces warm the home, which features two large, double-shouldered brick chimneys, adorned with the original owner's initials and highlighted with hearts. Although many homes in New England have this type of Flemish bond brickwork, the Alexander Long House is considered the finest example in the Southern United States and is the only example in North Carolina.

The property is now a private residence with a three-acre spring-fed bass pond. An additional 18 acres of manicured lawns and flower and vegetable gardens surround the home. The remaining 15 acres of the property are wooded with trails.
