= Dunbar School (Phoenix, Arizona) =

Dunbar Elementary School
- 707 W. Grant St., Phoenix, Arizona

Information
- Other name: Dunbar School; Paul Dunbar Lawrence School; Paul Laurence Dunbar School
- School district: Phoenix Elementary School District
- NCES District ID: 0406300
- NCES School ID: 040630000520
- Principal: Gina Millsaps
- Grades: PK–8

- Dunbar School
- U.S. National Register of Historic Places
- Location within Arizona Location within the United States
- Location: 707 W. Grant St., Phoenix, Arizona
- Coordinates: 33.440443°N 112.084408°W
- Built: 1925
- Architect: Fitzhugh & Byron
- Architectural style: Second Renaissance Revival
- NRHP reference No.: 93000740
- Added to NRHP: August 12, 1993

Dunbar Elementary School (also known as Dunbar School) is an elementary school in Phoenix, Arizona that was once segregated.

== History ==
Dunbar School was one of the first elementary schools built by Phoenix Elementary School District specifically for African-American students. It is named after poet Paul Laurence Dunbar.

While officials with the Dunbar School have labeled the school as a "historically Black school" during the era of segregation, contemporary sources have described the school as a segregated school during the era. At the time, segregation was optional for high schools in Arizona, but mandatory for elementary schools. The school, along with Frederick Douglass and Booker T. Washington, were the three segregated elementary schools in Phoenix.

By 1925, the school outgrew its two classrooms, and parents of those who attended the school demanded a new school, resulting in the construction of a one-story brick building. The school's construction was funded with monies from a $650,000 bond issue that passed in 1924.

Now, the school, like all schools in the United States following the 1954 Brown v. Board of Education ruling, is operated as an integrated institution.

The school was listed in the National Register of Historic Places in 1993, and was added to the City of Phoenix's Historic Property Register in 2005.

== Student population ==
In the 2014–2015 school year, the school had a student population of 304, with an overwhelming majority of the students either classified as "Hispanics" or African Americans.
