= Spencer, North Carolina =

- Town
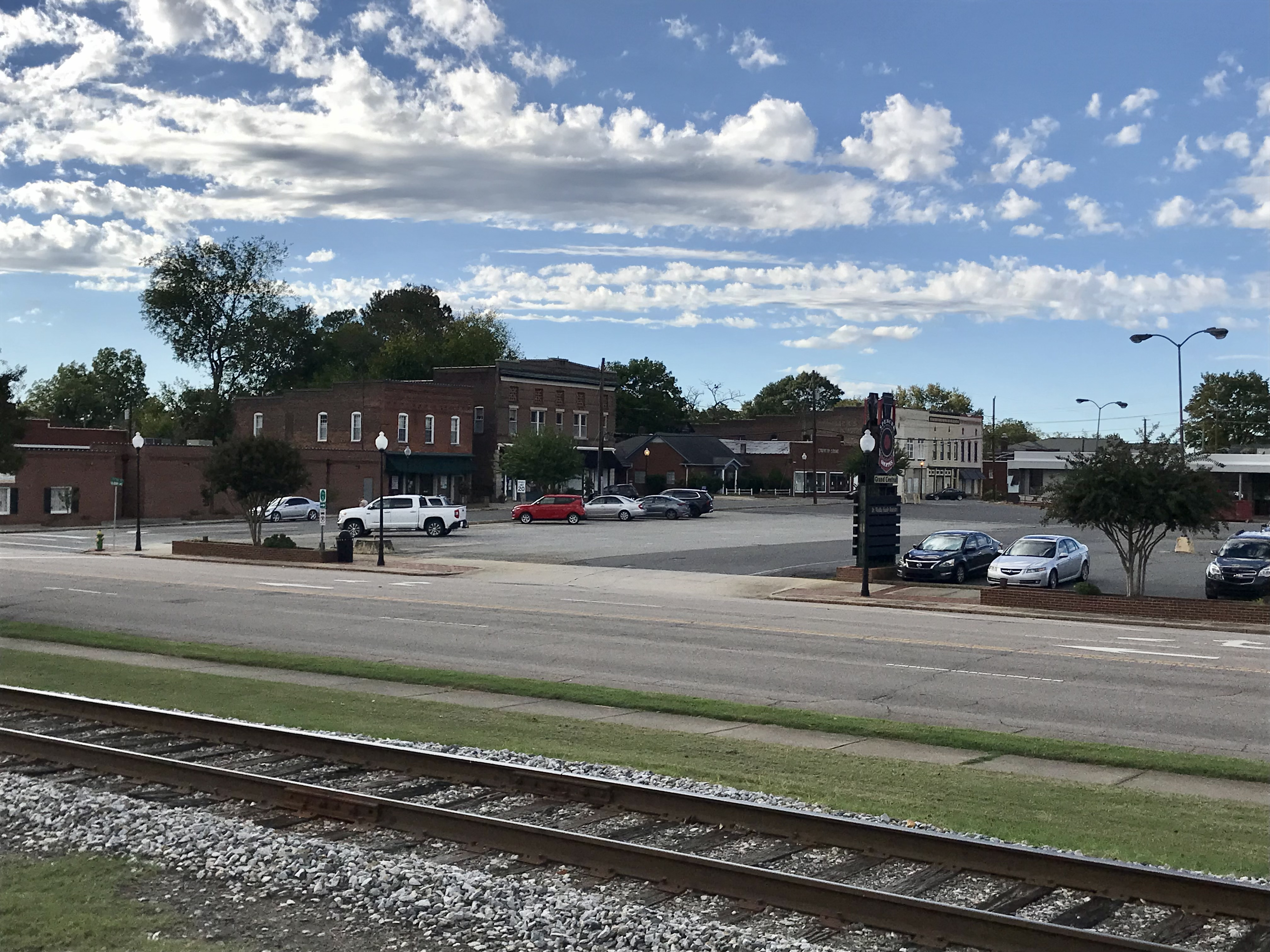
- Downtown Spencer

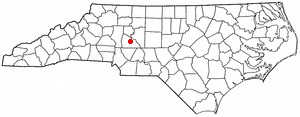
- Location of Spencer, North Carolina
- Coordinates: 35°41′55″N 80°25′31″W
- Country: United States
- State: North Carolina
- County: Rowan

Government
  - Mayor: Jonathan Williams

Area
  - Total: 3.07 sq mi (7.95 km^{2})
  - Land: 3.07 sq mi (7.95 km^{2})
  - Water: 0 sq mi (0.00 km^{2})
- Elevation: 719 ft (219 m)

Population (2020)
  - Total: 3,308
  - Density: 1,077.8/sq mi (416.14/km^{2})
- Time zone: UTC-5 (Eastern (EST))
  - Summer (DST): UTC-4 (EDT)
- ZIP code: 28159
- Area code: 704
- FIPS code: 37-63760
- GNIS feature ID: 2407381
- Website: spencernc.gov

Spencer is a town in Rowan County, North Carolina, United States, incorporated in 1905. As of the 2020 census, Spencer had a population of 3,308.

== History ==
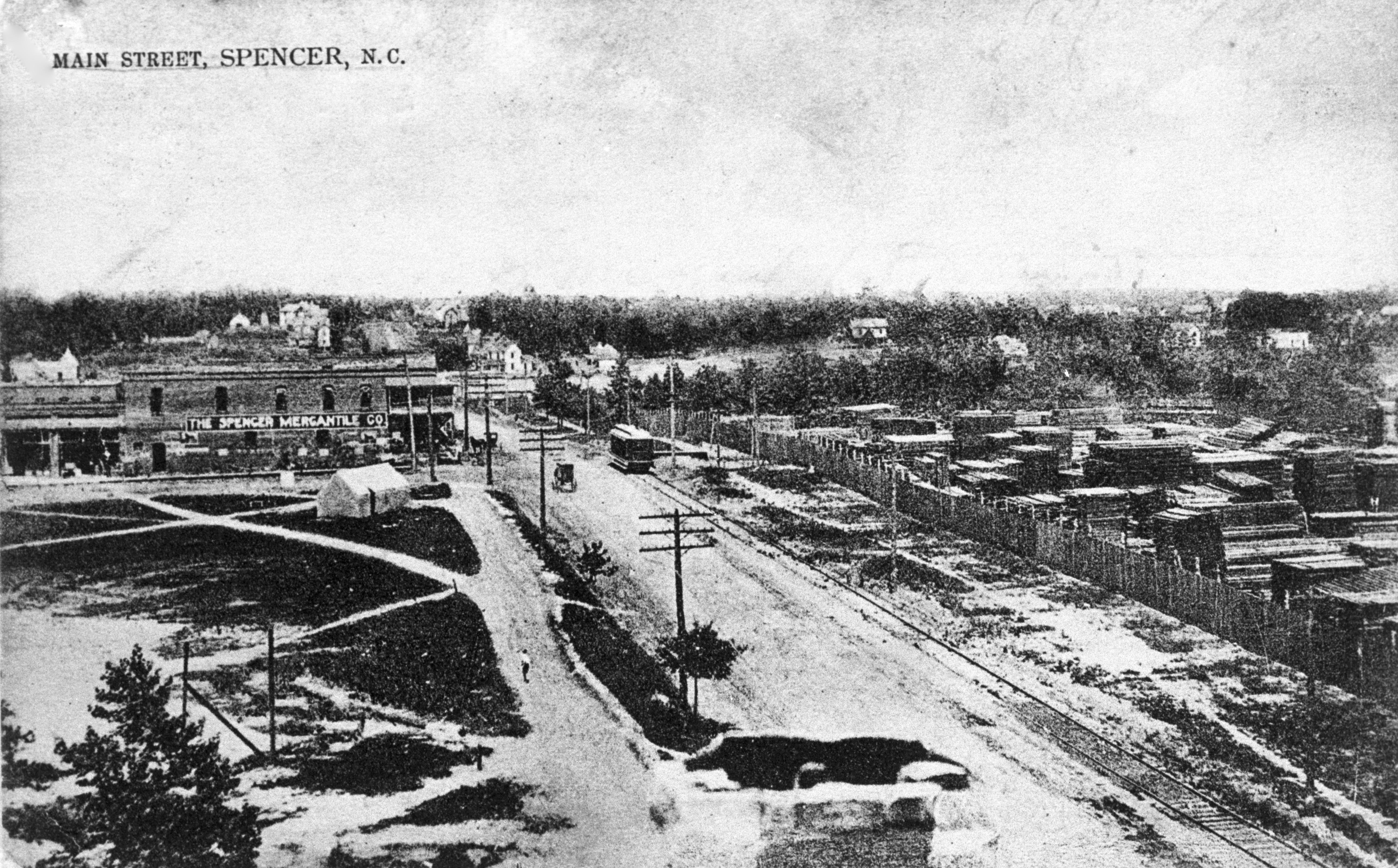
Main Street of Spencer, 1900s

The town was named for Samuel Spencer, first president of the Southern Railway, who is credited with establishment of the railroad's mechanical Spencer Shops at the site in 1896. The site was approximately the midpoint of the railroad's mainline between Atlanta, Georgia and Washington, D.C. As the shops were being built the Southern Railway developed a town, also named Spencer, alongside the shops for worker housing. Initially, the Southern partitioned 85 acres into 500 lots. Instead of creating a traditional "company" town in which the workers rented houses Southern sold the lots to workers or businesses for $100 apiece. The deeds did contain restrictive covenants which maintained that a dwelling costing in excess of $400 and approved by a Southern appointed architect be built within a year. The Southern donated lots for religious institutions. Southern also helped establish a YMCA in the town. The community grew quickly and by 1901 had 625 residents. By the 1920s it had 4,000 residents.

The former Spencer Shops were phased out during the 1950s through 1970s and have now become the location of the North Carolina Transportation Museum.

The Alexander Long House, Southern Railway Spencer Shops, and Spencer Historic District are listed on the National Register of Historic Places.

== Geography ==
According to the United States Census Bureau, the town has a total area of 2.7 square miles (7.0 km^{2}), all land.

== Demographics ==
Historical population
Census	Pop.	Note	%±
1910	1,915		—
1920	2,510		31.1%
1930	3,128		24.6%
1940	3,072		−1.8%
1950	3,242		5.5%
1960	2,904		−10.4%
1970	3,075		5.9%
1980	2,938		−4.5%
1990	3,219		9.6%
2000	3,355		4.2%
2010	3,267		−2.6%
2020	3,308		1.3%
U.S. Decennial Census

=== 2020 census ===
As of the 2020 census, Spencer had a population of 3,308. The median age was 39.9 years. 23.5% of residents were under the age of 18 and 17.7% were 65 years of age or older. For every 100 females, there were 93.9 males, and for every 100 females age 18 and over, there were 90.5 males age 18 and over.

96.1% of residents lived in urban areas, while 3.9% lived in rural areas.

There were 1,277 households in Spencer, of which 31.4% had children under the age of 18 living in them. Of all households, 38.1% were married-couple households, 20.6% were households with a male householder and no spouse or partner present, and 32.0% were households with a female householder and no spouse or partner present. About 29.2% of all households were made up of individuals, and 10.8% had someone living alone who was 65 years of age or older.

There were 1,473 housing units, of which 13.3% were vacant. The homeowner vacancy rate was 3.6% and the rental vacancy rate was 8.2%.

Spencer racial composition
Race	Number	Percentage
White (non-Hispanic)	1,686	50.97%
Black or African American (non-Hispanic)	1,065	32.19%
Native American	10	0.3%
Asian	22	0.67%
Pacific Islander	7	0.21%
Other/Mixed	175	5.29%
Hispanic or Latino	343	10.37%

=== 2000 census ===
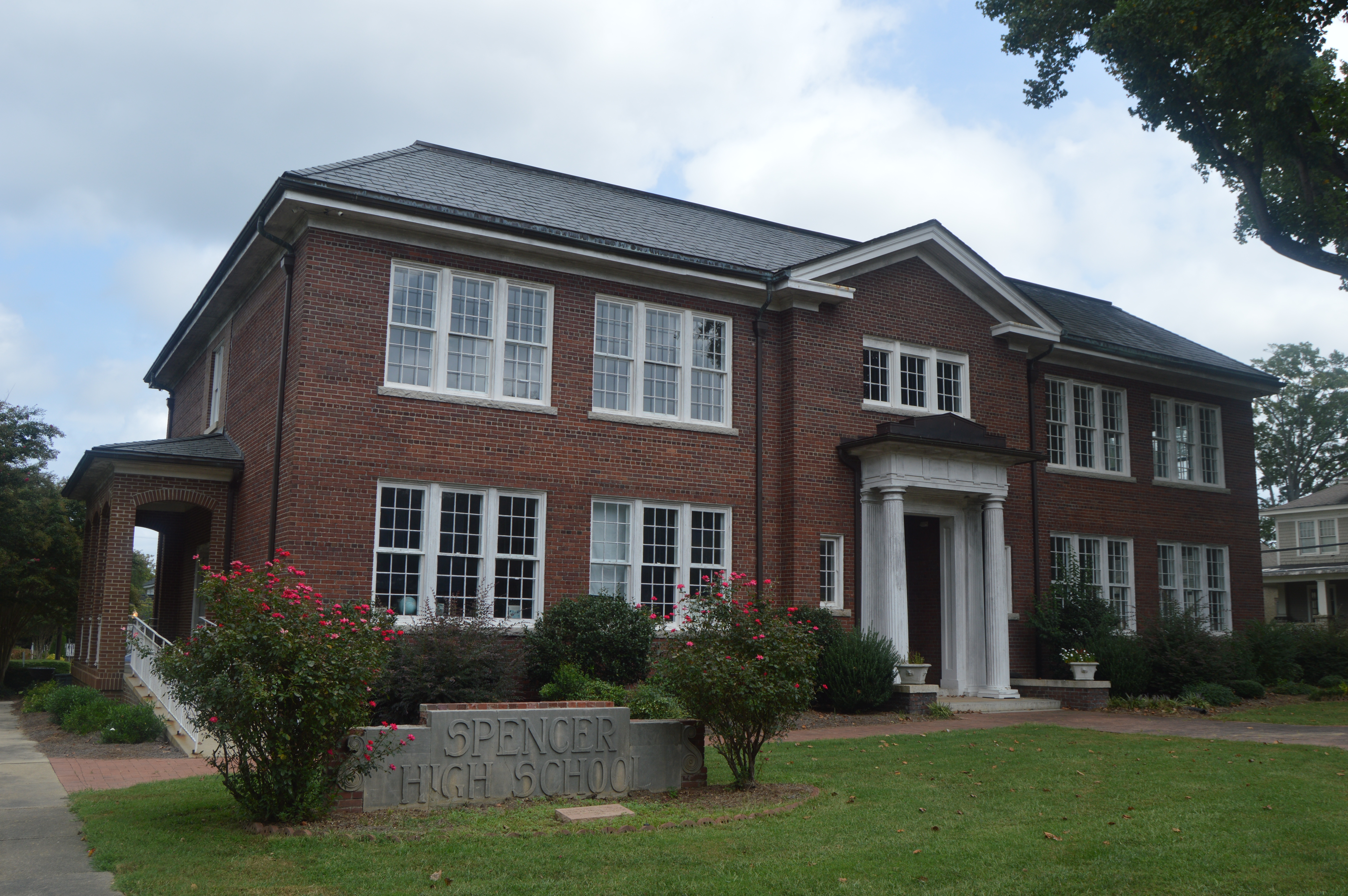
Town hall

As of the census of 2000, there were 3,355 people, 1,308 households, and 844 families residing in the town. The population density was 1,264.3 inhabitants per square mile (488.1/km^{2}). There were 1,427 housing units at an average density of 537.8 per square mile (207.6/km^{2}). The racial makeup of the town was 70.28% White, 23.61% African American, 0.36% Native American, 0.48% Asian, 0.03% Pacific Islander, 3.61% from other races, and 1.64% from two or more races. Hispanic or Latino of any race were 6.77% of the population.

There were 1,308 households, out of which 29.1% had children under the age of 18 living with them, 46.9% were married couples living together, 13.5% had a female householder with no husband present, and 35.4% were non-families. 29.9% of all households were made up of individuals, and 14.1% had someone living alone who was 65 years of age or older. The average household size was 2.46 and the average family size was 3.04.

In the town, the population was spread out, with 23.5% under the age of 18, 8.3% from 18 to 24, 29.4% from 25 to 44, 20.2% from 45 to 64, and 18.5% who were 65 years of age or older. The median age was 38 years. For every 100 females, there were 94.2 males. For every 100 females age 18 and over, there were 91.0 males.

The median income for a household in the town was $36,687, and the median income for a family was $43,702. Males had a median income of $28,860 versus $25,766 for females. The per capita income for the town was $16,354. About 7.7% of families and 9.5% of the population were below the poverty line, including 14.0% of those under age 18 and 8.7% of those age 65 or over.

== Education ==
- North Rowan High School
- North Rowan Middle School
- North Rowan Elementary School

== Notable person ==
- Gil Robinson (1910–1985), NFL player

== Works cited ==
- Neal, Larry K. Jr. (2011). Southern Railway's Historic Spencer Shops. Arcadia Publishing. ISBN 9780738587806.
