= Dunbar High School (East Spencer, North Carolina) =

School in Spencer, North Carolina (1900–1969)

Location
- East Spencer, North Carolina, U.S.
- 35.677117°N 80.443938°W

Information
- Other name: East Spencer Negro School (1900–1957); Dunbar High School (1958–1969)
- Established: 1900
- Closed: 1969

Dunbar High School was a public black school located in East Spencer, North Carolina, active from 1900 until the 1969. It was formerly known as East Spencer Negro School, and the Dunbar School. It was founded as a one-room school, and by 1958 it became a high school. After the school closure in the 1960s it was the site of North Rowan Middle School, followed by the Paul Laurence Dunbar Center.

== History ==
Dunbar High School, was founded as East Spencer Negro School, history that dates back to 1900 when it was a one-room schoolhouse. Over time, the school grew to multiple rooms, then in 1921, the school built an 11-classroom building with an auditorium, library, office, lunchroom, and basement. In 1958, the school became a high school and was named in honor of Paul Laurence Dunbar, a poet whose parents were freed slaves from Kentucky; and was one of the first African American poets to gain national recognition. In 1964, the school was the subject of a school bus driver protest which gained national attention.

=== Closure ===
After integration in 1969, Dunbar High School was renamed again to North Rowan Middle School. In the 1994, North Rowan Middle School moved to an alternate site, and the original building (still owned by the Rowan-Salisbury School System) became a community center with the name Paul Laurence Dunbar Center.

== See also ==
- North Rowan High School
