= National Register of Historic Places listings in Davidson County, North Carolina =

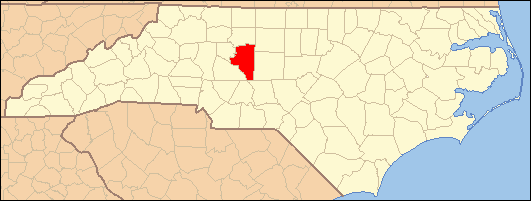

This list includes properties and districts listed on the National Register of Historic Places in Davidson County, North Carolina. Click the "Map of all coordinates" link to the right to view an online map of all properties and districts with latitude and longitude coordinates in the table below.

== Current listings ==
This National Park Service list is complete through NPS recent listings posted May 15, 2026.

	Name on the Register	Image	Date listed	Location	City or town	Description
1	Abbott's Creek Primitive Baptist Church Cemetery	Abbott's Creek Primitive Baptist Church Cemetery	July 10, 1984 (#84001982)	SR 1743; 36°00′20″N 80°05′01″W	Thomasville	
2	Adderton-Badgett House		July 10, 1984 (#84001988)	SR 2529; 35°34′02″N 80°08′36″W	Denton	
3	Beallmont		July 10, 1984 (#84001991)	SR 1133; 35°44′51″N 80°20′23″W	Linwood	
4	Beck's Reformed Church Cemetery	Beck's Reformed Church Cemetery	July 10, 1984 (#84001992)	SR 2250; 35°45′29″N 80°13′33″W	Lexington	
5	Bethany Reformed and Lutheran Church Cemetery		July 10, 1984 (#84001994)	SR 1716; 35°57′25″N 80°09′50″W	Midway	
6	Beulah Church of Christ Cemetery		July 10, 1984 (#84001995)	SR 1457; 35°53′17″N 80°16′43″W	Welcome	
7	Brummell's Inn		November 25, 1980 (#80002822)	North of Thomasville; 35°56′55″N 80°06′17″W	Thomasville	
8	Chapel Hill Church Tabernacle		April 24, 2012 (#12000235)	1457 Chapel Hill Church Rd. 35°33′13″N 80°04′16″W	Denton	
9	Church Street School	Church Street School	March 1, 1990 (#90000355)	Jasper St., West of Church St. 35°53′21″N 80°05′21″W	Thomasville	
10	City Memorial Hospital and Nurses' Home		December 29, 2025 (#100012433)	11 and 15 Pine Street, 608 Thomas Street; 35°52′30″N 80°04′42″W	Thomasville	
11	Dunbar High School		May 21, 2026 (#100013049)	301 Smith Avenue; 35°48′13″N 80°15′31″W	Lexington	
12	Emanuel United Church of Christ Cemetery	Emanuel United Church of Christ Cemetery	July 10, 1984 (#84001997)	SR 2060; 35°50′34″N 80°06′56″W	Thomasville	
13	Erlanger Mill Village Historic District	Erlanger Mill Village Historic District	January 9, 2008 (#07001371)	Roughly bounded by Winston Rd., Short, 7th, Hames, 2nd, Rainbow, Park Circle, and Olympia Sts. 35°50′23″N 80°15′20″W	Lexington	
14	Hamilton Everhart Farm		July 10, 1984 (#84002000)	US 52; 35°55′46″N 80°13′31″W	Midway	
15	Riley Everhart Farm and General Store		July 10, 1984 (#84002001)	SR 1468; 35°53′30″N 80°16′28″W	Arnold	
16	Fair Grove Methodist Church Cemetery	Fair Grove Methodist Church Cemetery	July 10, 1984 (#84002004)	NC 109, SR 2072 and 2070; 35°51′05″N 80°04′42″W	South Thomasville	
17	T. Austin and Ernestine L. Finch House	T. Austin and Ernestine L. Finch House	August 26, 2019 (#100004321)	17 E. Main St. 35°52′58″N 80°04′48″W	Thomasville	
18	First Reformed Church	First Reformed Church	April 28, 2000 (#00000417)	22 E. Center S. 35°49′25″N 80°15′08″W	Lexington	
19	Good Hope Methodist Church Cemetery		July 10, 1984 (#84002007)	Junction of NC 150 and SR 1445; 35°55′45″N 80°20′11″W	Welcome	
20	Grace Episcopal Church	Grace Episcopal Church	December 20, 2006 (#06001138)	419 S. Main St. 35°49′13″N 80°15′26″W	Lexington	
21	Grimes Brothers Mill	Grimes Brothers Mill	May 2, 2002 (#02000443)	2 North State St. 35°49′31″N 80°15′17″W	Lexington	
22	Grimes School	Grimes School	December 28, 1988 (#88002832)	Hege Dr. 35°50′00″N 80°15′22″W	Lexington	
23	Grimes-Crotts Mill		July 10, 1984 (#84002008)	SR 1445; 35°55′13″N 80°22′15″W	Reedy Creek	
24	Haden Place		July 10, 1984 (#84002009)	SR 1156; 35°45′56″N 80°21′34″W	Tyro	
25	Hampton House		July 10, 1984 (#84002025)	SR 483; 35°56′47″N 80°22′17″W	Arcadia	
26	Hedrick's Grove Reformed Church		January 31, 2008 (#07001496)	3840 Allred Rd. 35°46′18″N 80°10′48″W	Lexington	
27	Dr. William Rainey Holt House	Dr. William Rainey Holt House	June 23, 1983 (#83001876)	408 S. Main St. 35°49′15″N 80°15′27″W	Lexington	
28	Jersey Baptist Church Cemetery		July 10, 1984 (#84002027)	SR 1272; 35°43′57″N 80°18′43″W	Linwood	
29	Jersey Settlement Meeting House		July 10, 1984 (#84002032)	SR 1272; 35°43′55″N 80°18′42″W	Linwood	
30	Junior Order United American Mechanics National Orphans Home		July 10, 1984 (#84002034)	NC 8; 35°45′49″N 80°16′38″W	Lexington	
31	Capt. John Koonts Jr. Farm		July 10, 1984 (#84002131)	SR 1186; 35°50′43″N 80°22′59″W	Tyro	
32	Shadrach Lambeth House	Shadrach Lambeth House	July 10, 1984 (#84002135)	SR 2062; 35°51′24″N 80°03′19″W	Thomasville	
33	Lexington Industrial Historic District	Lexington Industrial Historic District	May 15, 2019 (#100003927)	Roughly bounded by E. 1st and S. Salisbury Sts., the North Carolina Railroad corridor, and Wennonah Cotton Mill village's western lot lines 35°49′22″N 80°15′06″W	Lexington	
34	Lexington Memorial Hospital	Lexington Memorial Hospital	May 24, 2012 (#12000313)	111 North Carolina Ave. 35°48′35″N 80°14′53″W	Lexington	
35	Lexington Residential Historic District	Lexington Residential Historic District	April 19, 2007 (#07000350)	Roughly bounded by State St., W. 5th St., Martin St., Westside Dr., Southbound St., and W. 9th Ave. 35°49′34″N 80°15′34″W	Lexington	
36	Lincoln Park Historic District		May 21, 2026 (#100013053)	Roughly bounded by South Talbert Blvd., Arthur Drive. and Booker; 35°48′55″N 80°15′17″W	Lexington	
37	Mitchell House	Mitchell House	September 20, 2000 (#00001121)	411 Biggs Ave. 35°52′39″N 80°05′38″W	Thomasville	
38	Eli Moore House		July 10, 1984 (#84002137)	SR 1741; 35°58′52″N 80°03′41″W	High Point	
39	Mor-Val Hosiery Mill	Mor-Val Hosiery Mill	October 5, 2001 (#01001074)	N. Main and E. 1st Sts. 35°38′04″N 80°06′49″W	Denton	
40	Mount Ebal Methodist Protestant Church		July 10, 1984 (#84002143)	End of SR 2518; 35°37′34″N 80°04′05″W	Denton	
41	Old Davidson County Courthouse	Old Davidson County Courthouse	June 24, 1971 (#71000576)	Main and Center Sts. 35°49′30″N 80°15′13″W	Lexington	
42	Pilgrim Reformed Church Cemetery		July 10, 1984 (#84002145)	SR 1843; 35°51′10″N 80°13′03″W	Lexington	
43	Randolph Street Historic District	Randolph Street Historic District	August 28, 2012 (#12000571)	100-200 blocks of Randolph St., & 10 W. Colonial Dr. 35°52′48″N 80°04′51″W	Thomasville	
44	Reid Farm		January 25, 1979 (#79001700)	West of Jackson Hill on SR 2537; 35°34′10″N 80°11′58″W	Jackson Hill	
45	St. Stephen United Methodist Church		August 6, 2021 (#100006812)	102 East First St. 35°49′25″N 80°15′05″W	Lexington	
46	Salem Street Historic District	Salem Street Historic District	August 9, 2006 (#06000688)	108-301 Salem St., 6-12 Forsyth St., and 6 Leonard St. 35°53′19″N 80°05′02″W	Thomasville	
47	Henry Shoaf Farm	Henry Shoaf Farm	July 13, 1984 (#84002148)	NC 64; 35°50′07″N 80°16′49″W	Lexington	
48	Smith Clinic	Smith Clinic	November 29, 1991 (#91001746)	17 Randolph St. 35°52′54″N 80°04′51″W	Thomasville	
49	Philip Sowers House	Philip Sowers House	November 25, 1980 (#80002821)	SR 1162; 35°47′30″N 80°27′40″W	Churchland	
50	Adam Spach Rock House Site	Adam Spach Rock House Site	June 14, 2002 (#02000643)	Address Restricted	Winston-Salem	
51	Spring Hill Methodist Protestant Church Cemetery		July 10, 1984 (#84002151)	SR 1755; 35°58′15″N 80°03′20″W	High Point	
52	Spurgeon House	Spurgeon House	April 20, 1983 (#83001877)	West of High Point; 35°59′15″N 80°05′19″W	High Point	
53	St. Luke's Lutheran Church Cemetery		July 10, 1984 (#84002147)	SR 1183; 35°49′00″N 80°22′32″W	Tyro	
54	Thomasville Downtown Historic District	Thomasville Downtown Historic District	September 1, 2005 (#05000940)	Roughly bounded by Main St., Trade St., Guilford St. and Commerce St. 35°53′00″N 80°04′53″W	Thomasville	
55	Thomasville Railroad Passenger Depot	Thomasville Railroad Passenger Depot	July 9, 1981 (#81000423)	W. Main St. 35°52′57″N 80°05′00″W	Thomasville	
56	Tyro Tavern		August 16, 1984 (#84002154)	NC 150; 35°48′23″N 80°22′37″W	Tyro	
57	Uptown Lexington Historic District	Uptown Lexington Historic District	May 16, 1996 (#96000570)	Main St. from 3rd Ave. to 2nd St. 35°49′24″N 80°15′15″W	Lexington	
58	Waggoner Graveyard		July 10, 1984 (#84002158)	SR 1814; 35°55′21″N 80°11′46″W	Welcome	
59	George W. Wall House		July 10, 1984 (#84002161)	NC 109 and SR 1723; 36°00′35″N 80°08′31″W	Wallburg	
60	John Henry Welborn House	John Henry Welborn House	July 10, 1984 (#84002163)	511 S. Main St. 35°49′09″N 80°15′29″W	Lexington	Destroyed 1990;
61	Yadkin College Historic District		February 25, 1988 (#88000165)	Northern and southern sides of SR 1194 west of SR 1436; 35°52′32″N 80°22′56″W	Yadkin College	

== See also ==
- National Register of Historic Places listings in North Carolina
- List of National Historic Landmarks in North Carolina
