= Davidson County Courthouse =

Davidson County Courthouse may refer to:

- Old Davidson County Courthouse (North Carolina), Lexington, North Carolina
- Davidson County Courthouse (Tennessee), Nashville, Tennessee
