= Adam Spach Rock House Site =

Historic site in North Carolina, U.S.

- U.S. National Register of Historic Places
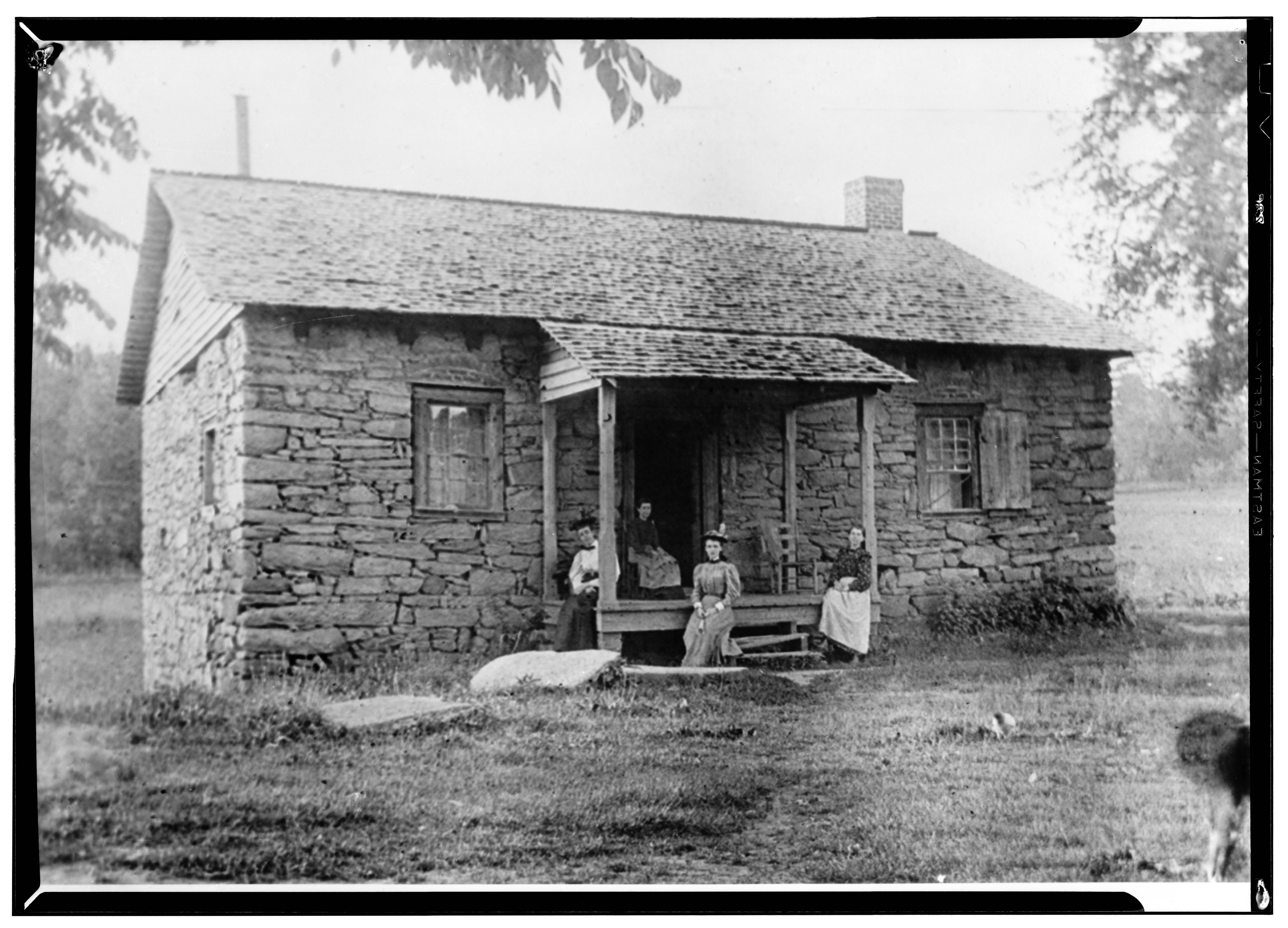
- c. 1900
- Nearest city: Winston-Salem, North Carolina
- Area: 6.3 acres (2.5 ha)
- Built: 1754
- NRHP reference No.: 02000643
- Added to NRHP: June 14, 2002

The Adam Spach Rock House Site is a historic archaeological site in Davidson County, North Carolina. Located near the community of Friedberg, it consists of the ruins of a stone house built in 1774 by Adam Spach, founder of the Friedberg Moravian Church. Spach, who came to the area in 1754, supposedly built the house as a fortified defense against attacks from local Native Americans, setting it on top of a spring to provide a regular water source.

The site was listed on the National Register of Historic Places in 2002.

On Saturday, September 23, 2023, as part of Friedberg Moravian Church's 250th Anniversary Celebration - a "Walk to the Rock House" event was held. This event was an afternoon of learning about the history of Friedberg, where volunteers will share historical relics, photos, & stories. Mid-afternoon approximately 100 people walked from the church to the site of Adam Spach's Rock House site (about a 25-minute walk) for an outdoor vespers & communion service, along with music provided by the Moravian Band. Members of the Wachovia Historical Society were also in attendance.

== See also ==
- National Register of Historic Places listings in Davidson County, North Carolina
