= Vitacost =

American e-commerce company

Vitacost.com, Inc.
- Type: Subsidiary
- Founded: 1994; 32 years ago
- Headquarters: Boca Raton, Florida, United States
- Products: Health foods, nutritional supplements, vitamins, beverages, herbs; bath, baby, pet and beauty products
- Parent: iHerb
- Website: www.vitacost.com

Vitacost.com, Inc. is an American e-commerce company based in Boca Raton, Florida, that sells vitamins, supplements and organic grocery products. The company was bought by Kroger in 2014. Vitacost was inducted into Inc Magazine's "Inc. 500 Lifetime Hall of Fame," in 2006 as one of the US's 500 fastest-growing privately held businesses for five consecutive years (2001–2005). The company was acquired by iHerb on 8 January, 2026.

== History ==
Vitacost began operations in 1994 as a catalog retailer of third-party vitamins and supplements under the name Nature's Wealth Company by its founder Wayne Gorsek.

In 1999, the company launched Vitacost.com and introduced proprietary vitamins and supplements, which has since expanded to include food, beauty products and sports nutrition.

The company completed construction of a manufacturing facility located in Lexington, North Carolina, in 2008. Effective September 1, 2012, Vitacost agreed to lease its manufacturing facilities to a third-party provider.

On September 23, 2009, Vitacost went public.

Vitacost shares traded on the NASDAQ were suspended on December 7, 2010, for financials not adding up. By the time the stock was reinstated by NASDAQ, the stock had lost most of its value with investors losing almost all of their investment. ("Gebben").

During 2010, the company expanded and upgraded its West Coast distribution facility located in Las Vegas, Nevada. The Company began a similar project for its east coast distribution center, located in Lexington, North Carolina in the spring of 2010, with the building construction completed in the first quarter of 2011.

Gorsek was found guilty of securities fraud on January 28, 2003. The SEC Commission announced on this day that the Honorable Jeanne E. Scott, U.S. District Judge for the Central District of Illinois, has found two former brokers and stock promoters, Wayne F. Gorsek ("Gorsek") and Lyndell F. Parks ("Parks"), liable for violating the antifraud provisions of the federal securities laws and has enjoined them from further violations of Sections 17(a) and (b) of the Securities Act of 1933 ("Securities Act"), Section 10(b) of the Securities Exchange Act of 1934 ("Exchange Act") and Exchange Act Rule 10b-5. Judge Scott also imposed additional sanctions against defendants Gorsek, Parks and P. Brenden Gebben.

In October 2012, Vitacost.com launched a cruelty-free specialty store showcasing beauty and personal care products that are independently certified by the Leaping Bunny Program, which is operated by the Coalition for Consumer Information on Cosmetics.

In 2013, Vitacost released several new product lines, including a new sports nutrition line, ARO: Black Series, which includes pre- and post-workout formulas, protein powders, flavored glutamine, creatine and branched-chain amino acids.

Kroger announced in July 2014 that it would purchase Vitacost.com for $280 million. The acquisition was completed in August 2014.

== Reception ==
In 2017, the company received two awards from the ConsumerLab.com Survey for Top-rated Supplement Brands on Overall Consumer Satisfaction and Top-rated Supplement Merchants on Overall Consumer Satisfaction.
