= Beck's Reformed Church Cemetery =

Historic cemetery in Davidson County, North Carolina, US

- U.S. National Register of Historic Places
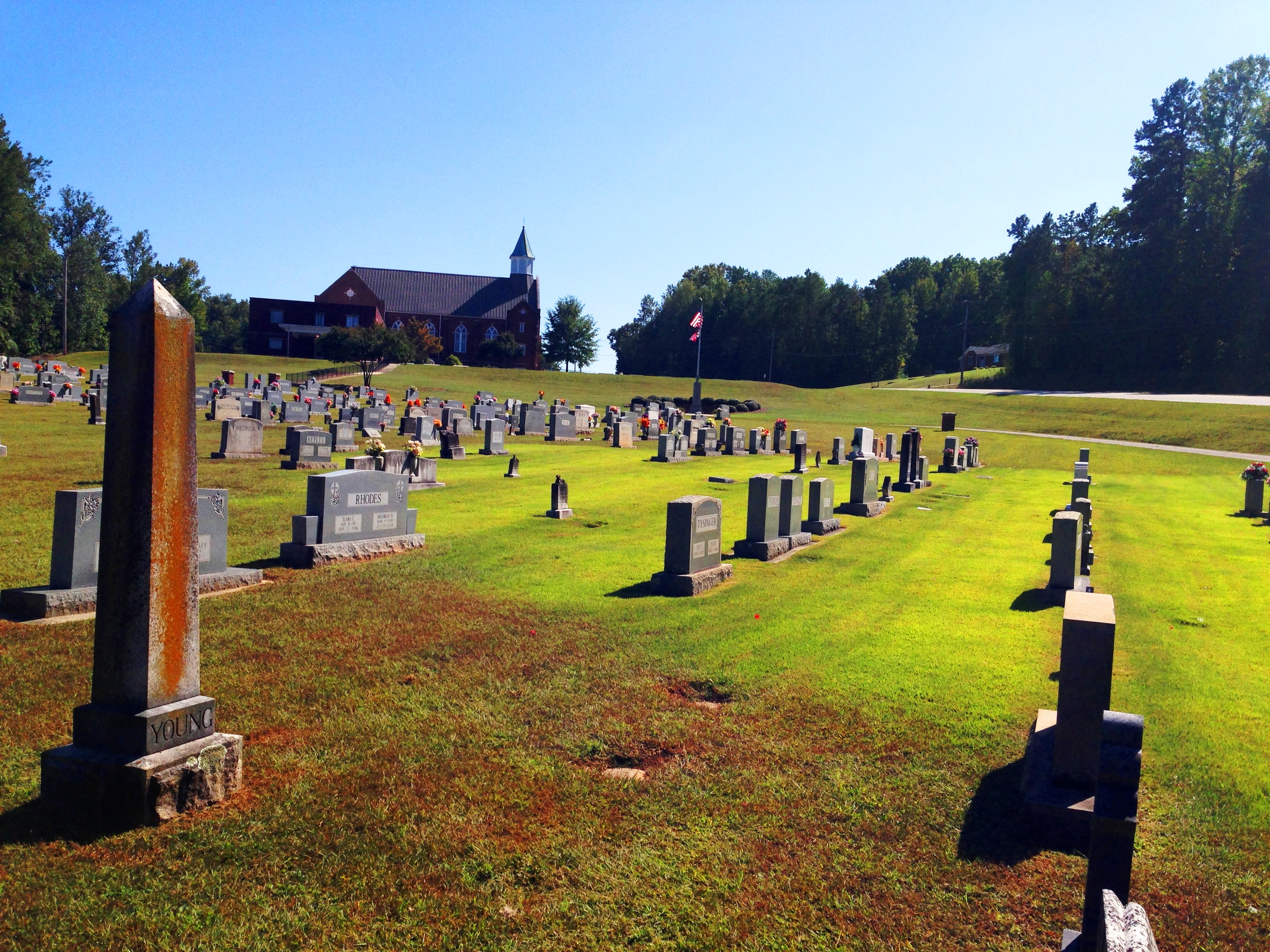

- Location within North Carolina Location within the United States
- Location: SR 2250, Lexington, North Carolina
- Coordinates: 35°45′28″N 80°13′32″W
- Area: 2.5 acres (1.0 ha)
- MPS: Anglo-German Cemeteries TR
- NRHP reference No.: 84001992
- Added to NRHP: July 10, 1984

Beck's Reformed Church Cemetery (also known as Becks United Church of Christ Cemetery) is a historic church cemetery located in Lexington, Davidson County, North Carolina. It contains approximately 100 burials, with the earliest gravestone dated to 1771. It is associated with the Beck's Lutheran and Reformed Church, founded in 1787. It features a unique collection of folk gravestones by local stonecutters erected in Davidson County in the late-18th and first half of the 19th centuries.

It was listed on the National Register of Historic Places in 1984.
