= Grimes School =

Historic school building in North Carolina, United States

- U.S. National Register of Historic Places
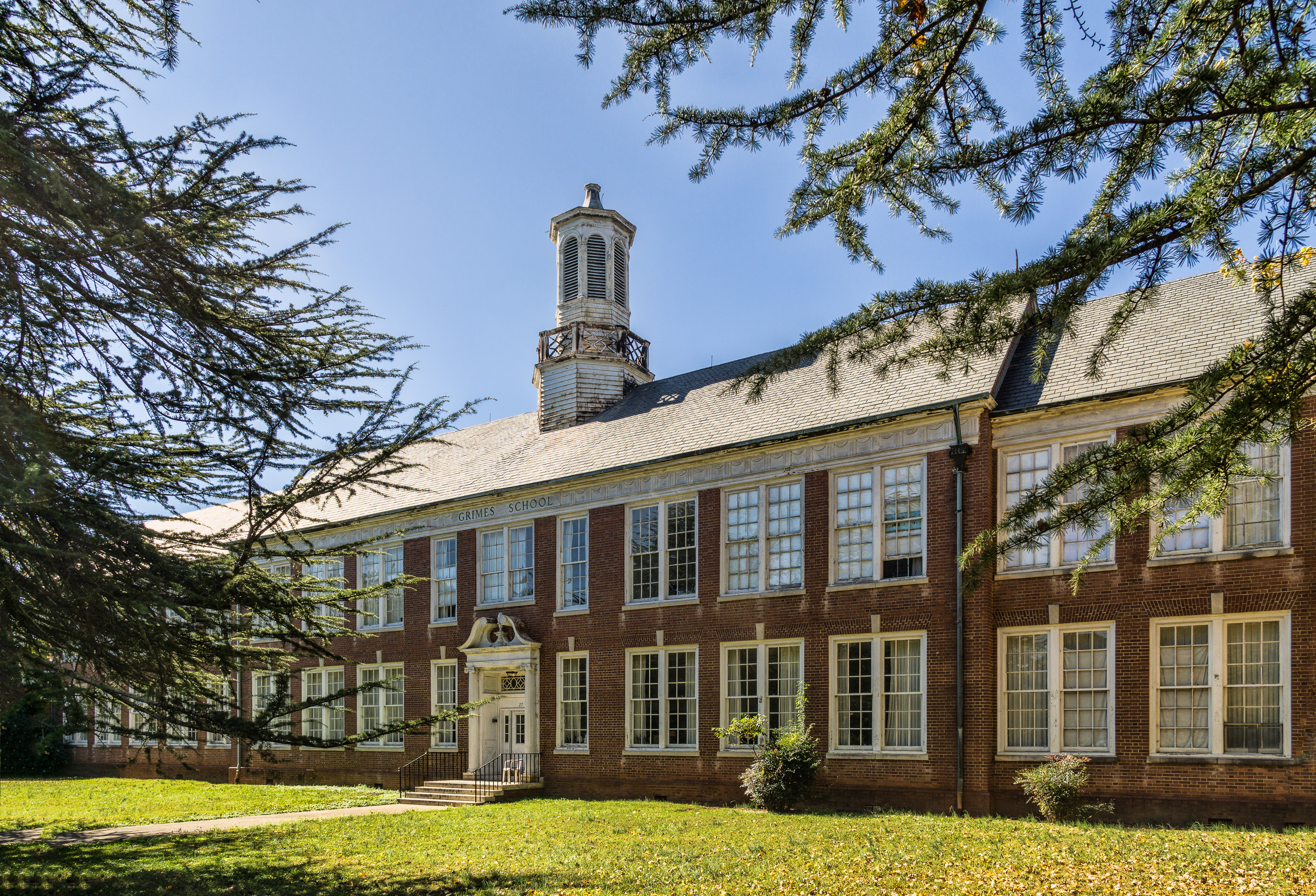

- Location within North Carolina Location within the United States
- Location: Hege Dr., Lexington, North Carolina
- Coordinates: 35°50′0″N 80°15′22″W
- Area: 3 acres (1.2 ha)
- Built: 1935-1936
- Built by: Ward & Thomason
- Architect: Wallace, William Roy
- Architectural style: Colonial Revival, Georgian Revival
- NRHP reference No.: 88002832
- Added to NRHP: December 28, 1988

Grimes School is a historic school building located at Lexington, Davidson County, North Carolina. It was built in 1935–1936, and is a two-story, T-shaped, Colonial Revival-style Flemish bond brick building. It features large windows, an entrance portico with Ionic order fluted columns, and a large octagonal cupola. Some funding for school construction was provided by the Public Works Administration.

It was added to the National Register of Historic Places in 1988.

== See also ==
- National Register of Historic Places listings in Davidson County, North Carolina
