= First Reformed Church (Lexington, North Carolina) =

Historic church in North Carolina, United States

- U.S. National Register of Historic Places
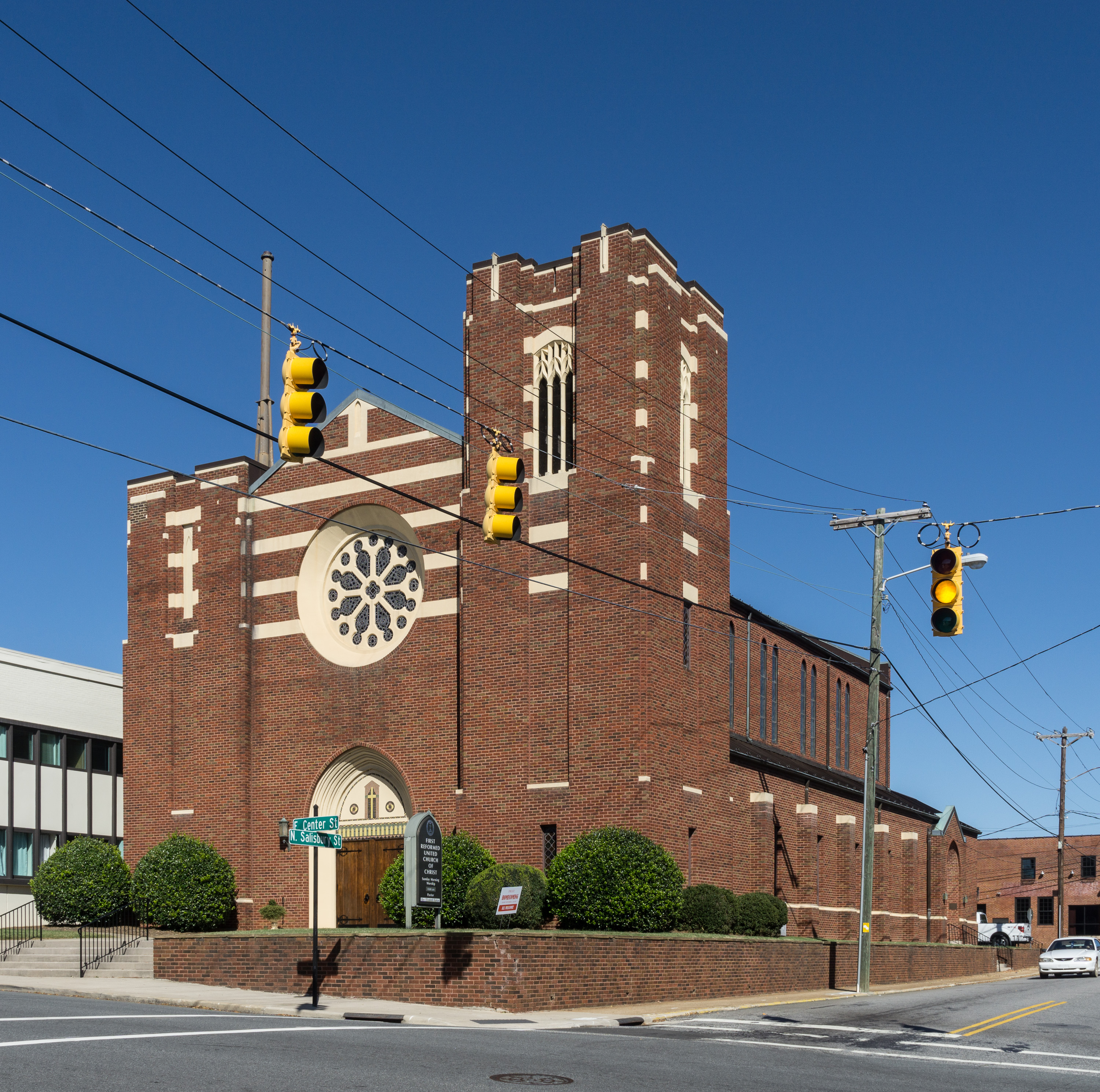

- Location within North Carolina Location within the United States
- Location: 22 E. Center S., Lexington, North Carolina
- Coordinates: 35°49′25″N 80°15′8″W
- Area: less than one acre
- Built: 1927-1928
- Architect: Hunter, Herbert B.
- Architectural style: Late Gothic Revival
- NRHP reference No.: 00000417
- Added to NRHP: April 28, 2000

First Reformed Church, also known as the First Reformed United Church of Christ, is a historic Reformed church located at 22 E. Center Street in Lexington, Davidson County, North Carolina. It was designed by architect Herbert B. Hunter and built in 1927–1928. It is a steel frame building sheathed in tapestry brick, with a Late Gothic Revival-style interior. It features a pair of corner towers of uneven height, pointed-arched portal, and a stone and stained glass rose window.

It was added to the National Register of Historic Places in 2000.

== See also ==
- National Register of Historic Places listings in Davidson County, North Carolina
