= Uptown Lexington Historic District =

Historic district in North Carolina, United States

- U.S. National Register of Historic Places
- U.S. Historic district
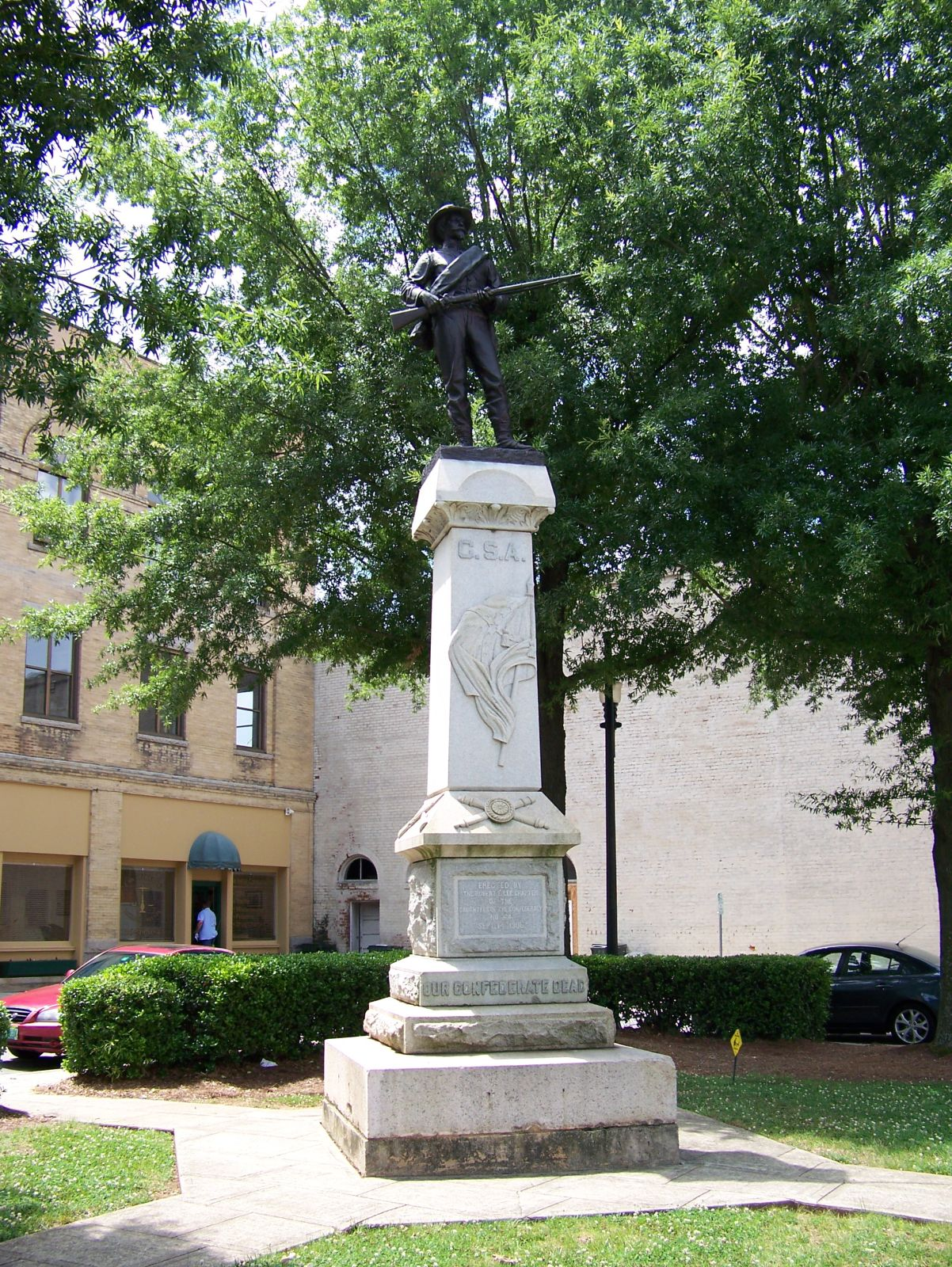
- Confederate monument, 2012, now removed.

- Location within North Carolina Location within the United States
- Location: 3rd Ave. to 3rd St., Lexington, North Carolina
- Coordinates: 35°49′24″N 80°15′15″W
- Area: 13.5 acres (5.5 ha)
- Built: 1824
- Architect: Dudley, George & Ashley, Wm., et al
- Architectural style: Early Commercial, Renaissance, Classical Revival
- NRHP reference No.: 96000570
- Added to NRHP: May 16, 1996

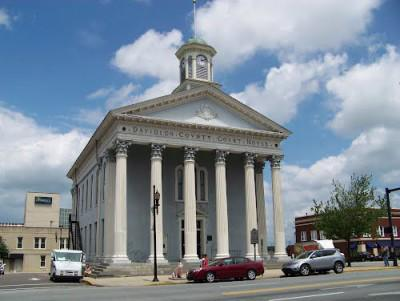
Old Davidson County Courthouse, 2012

Uptown Lexington Historic District is a national historic district located at Lexington, Davidson County, North Carolina. The district encompasses 52 contributing buildings, 3 contributing sites, and 1 contributing object in the central business district of Lexington. It includes commercial and governmental buildings built between 1824 and 1946. Located in the district is the separately listed Old Davidson County Courthouse. Other notable buildings include the former United States Post Office (1911–1912), Raper Building (c. 1907), Moffitt Building (1920s), Smith-Thompson Block (1900), the Development Building (c. 1905), the Buchanan-Siceloff Building (1923–1929), the Hinkle Block (1902–1907), the Hankins Building (1902), Hedrick's Hall (1902), and the Earnhardt Building (1923–1929).

It was added to the National Register of Historic Places in 1996.
