= Henry Shoaf Farm =

Historic farm in North Carolina, United States

- U.S. National Register of Historic Places
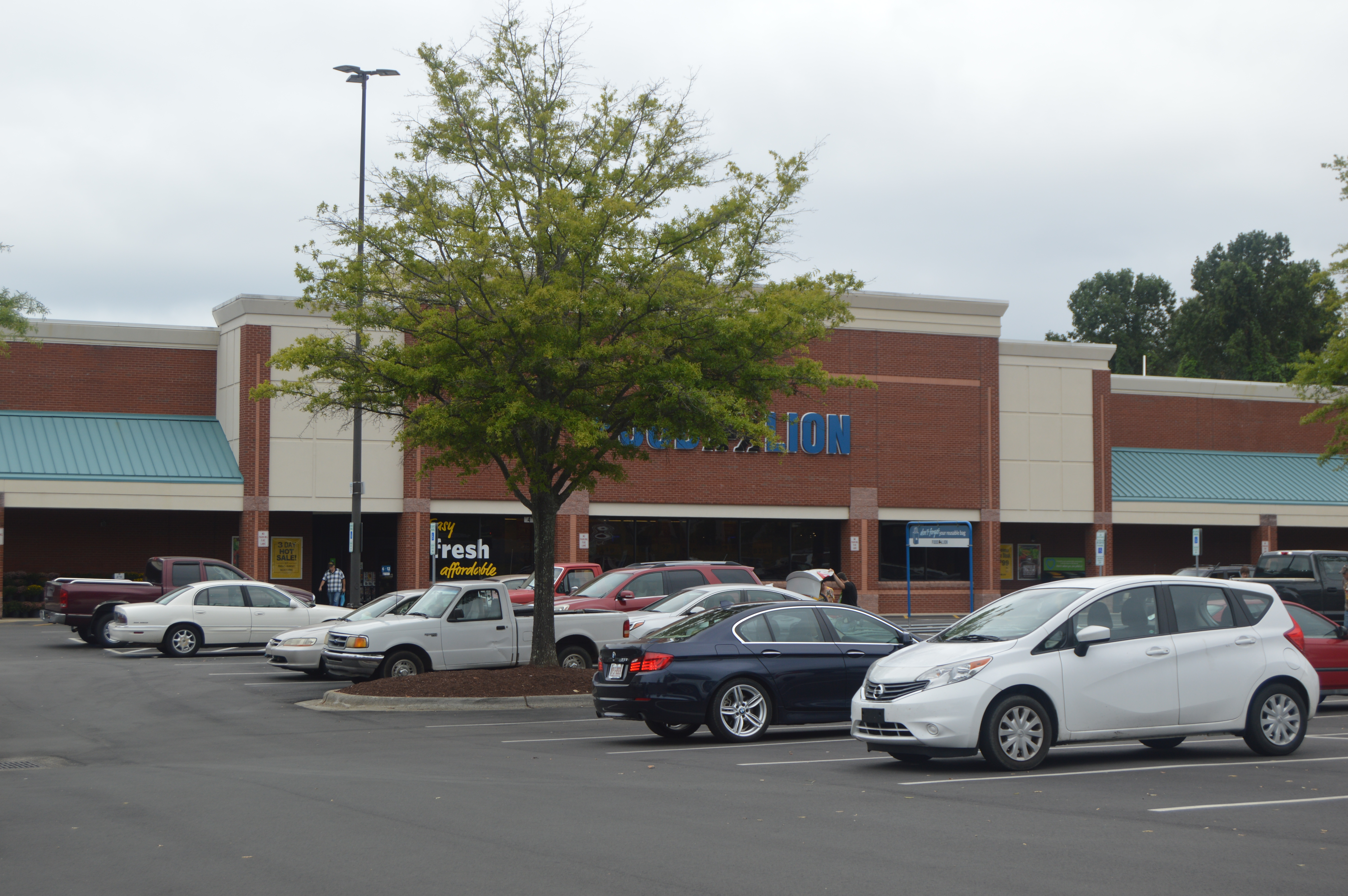
- Site of the farm

- Location within North Carolina Location within the United States
- Location: NC 64, near Lexington, North Carolina
- Coordinates: 35°50′07″N 80°16′49″W
- Area: 10.7 acres (4.3 ha)
- Built: 1811, c. 1860
- Architect: Multiple
- Architectural style: Italianate
- MPS: Davidson County MRA
- NRHP reference No.: 84002148
- Added to NRHP: July 13, 1984

Henry Shoaf Farm was a historic farm complex located near Lexington, Davidson County, North Carolina. The complex included a two-story log house with an Italianate style addition built about 1860, double pen log barn dated to 1811, smokehouse, corn crib, granary, and potato house. It has been demolished.

It was added to the National Register of Historic Places in 1984.
