= Hedrick's Grove Reformed United Church of Christ =

Historic church in North Carolina, United States

- U.S. National Register of Historic Places
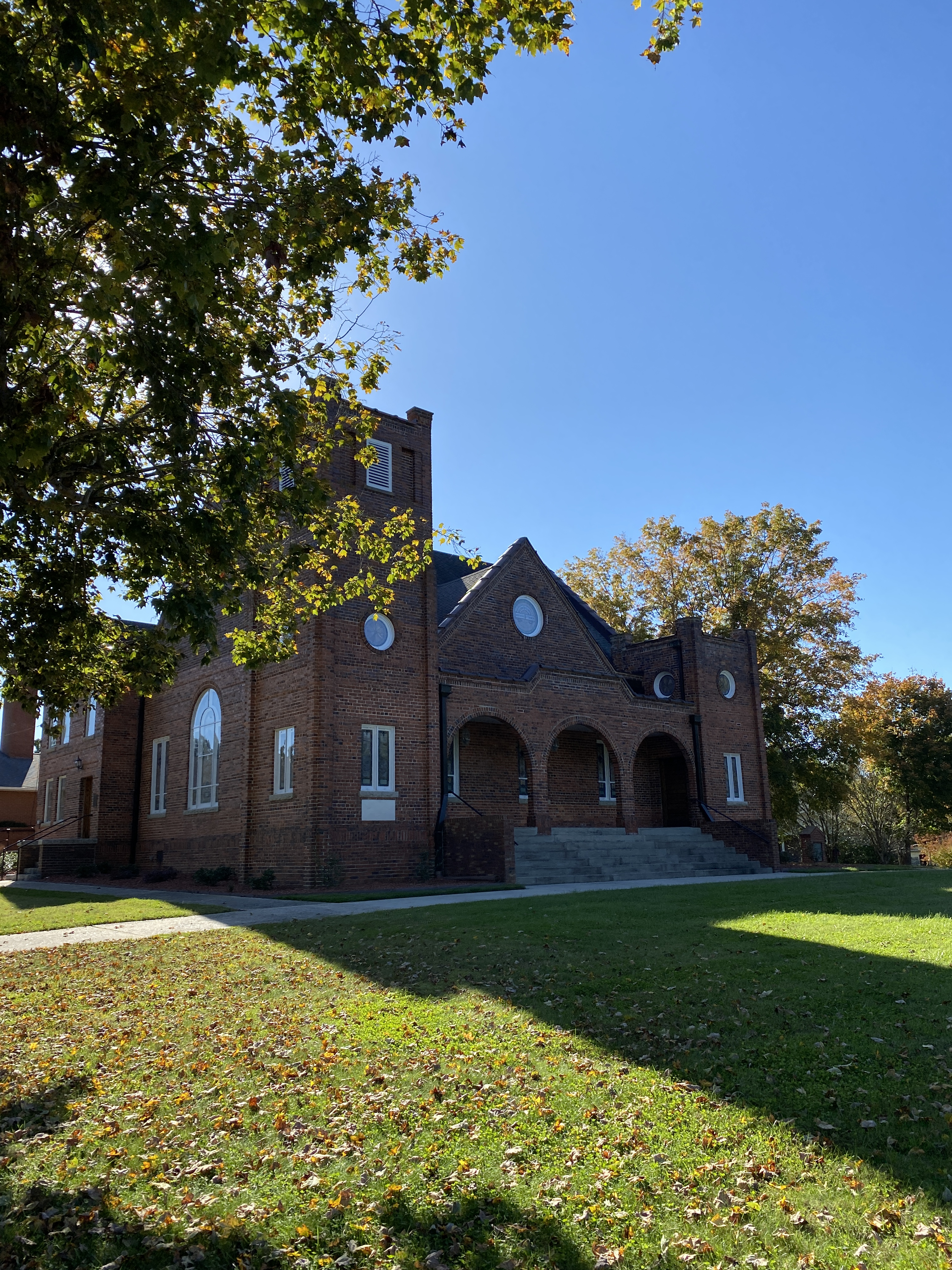
- Front of Hedrick's Grove Reformed United Church of Christ

- Location within North Carolina Location within the United States
- Location: 3840 Allred Rd., near Lexington, North Carolina
- Coordinates: 35°46′18″N 80°10′48″W
- Area: 3.2 acres (1.3 ha)
- Built: 1921-1922
- Architectural style: Romanesque
- NRHP reference No.: 07001496
- Added to NRHP: January 31, 2008

Hedrick's Grove Reformed United Church of Christ is a historic Reformed church located near Lexington, Davidson County, North Carolina. It was established in 1891. The current sanctuary was built in 1921–1922, and is a large Romanesque Revival-style brick structure. It features a pair of corner towers of uneven height joined by a central arcaded loggia. Also on the property is a contributing church cemetery with approximately 375 graves.

The sanctuary was added to the National Register of Historic Places in 2008.

Located directly behind the sanctuary is the Educational Building, which holds Sunday School classrooms, offices, and a Fellowship Hall.
