= John Henry Welborn House =

Historic house in North Carolina, United States

- U.S. National Register of Historic Places
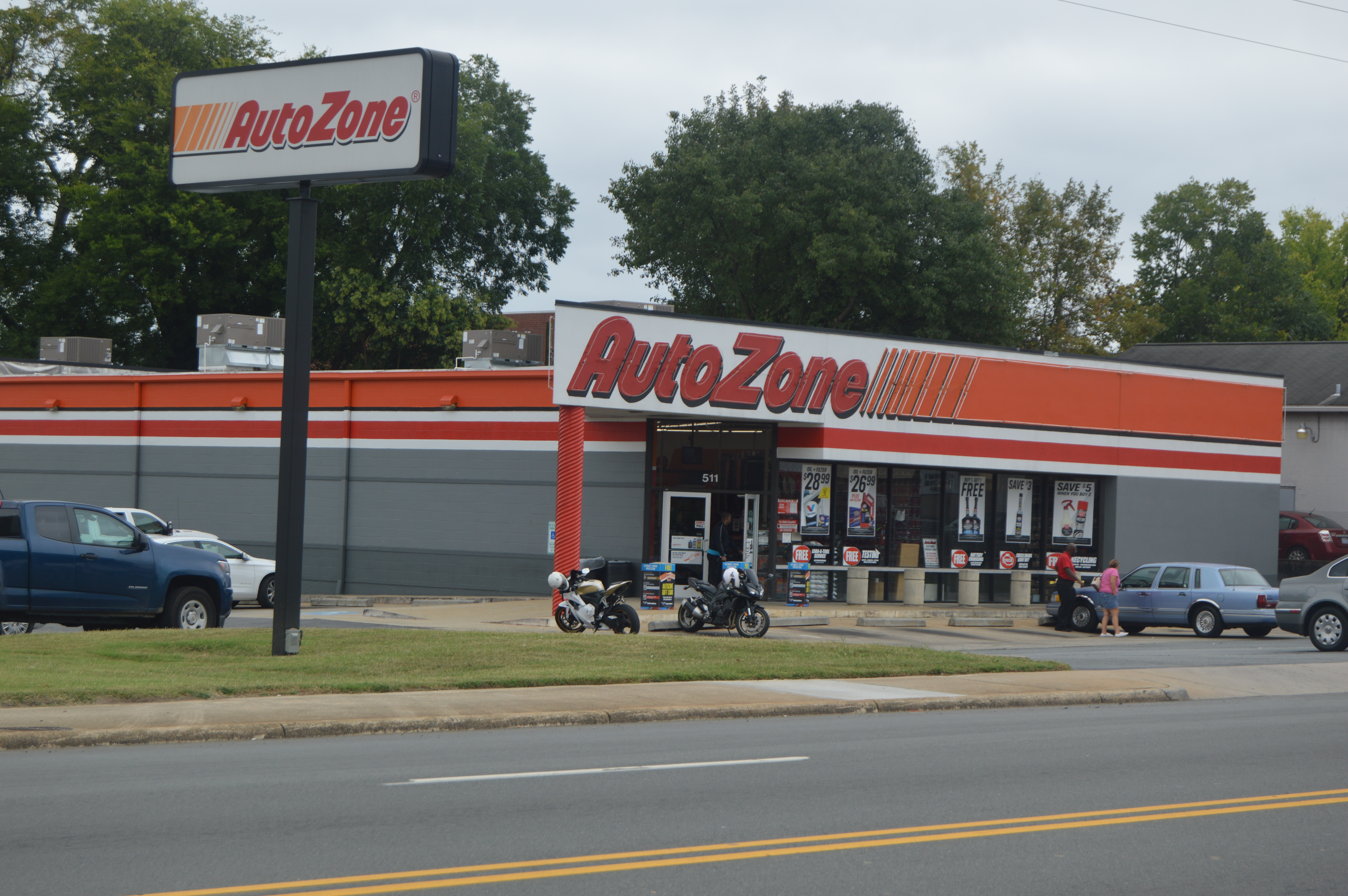
- Site of the house

- Location within North Carolina Location within the United States
- Location: 511 S. Main St., Lexington, North Carolina
- Coordinates: 35°49′9″N 80°15′29″W
- Area: 1.5 acres (0.61 ha)
- Built: c. 1870
- Architectural style: Italianate
- MPS: Davidson County MRA
- NRHP reference No.: 84002163
- Added to NRHP: July 10, 1984

John Henry Welborn House was a historic home located at Lexington, Davidson County, North Carolina. It was built about 1870, and was a two-story, Italianate style frame I-house dwelling. It had a two-story rear wing and "L"-configuration. It was remodeled in the Neo-Classical style around the turn of the 20th century. Also on the property was a contributing smokehouse. The house has been demolished.

It was added to the National Register of Historic Places in 1984.
