= Grimes Brothers Mill =

Historic industrial building in North Carolina, US

- U.S. National Register of Historic Places
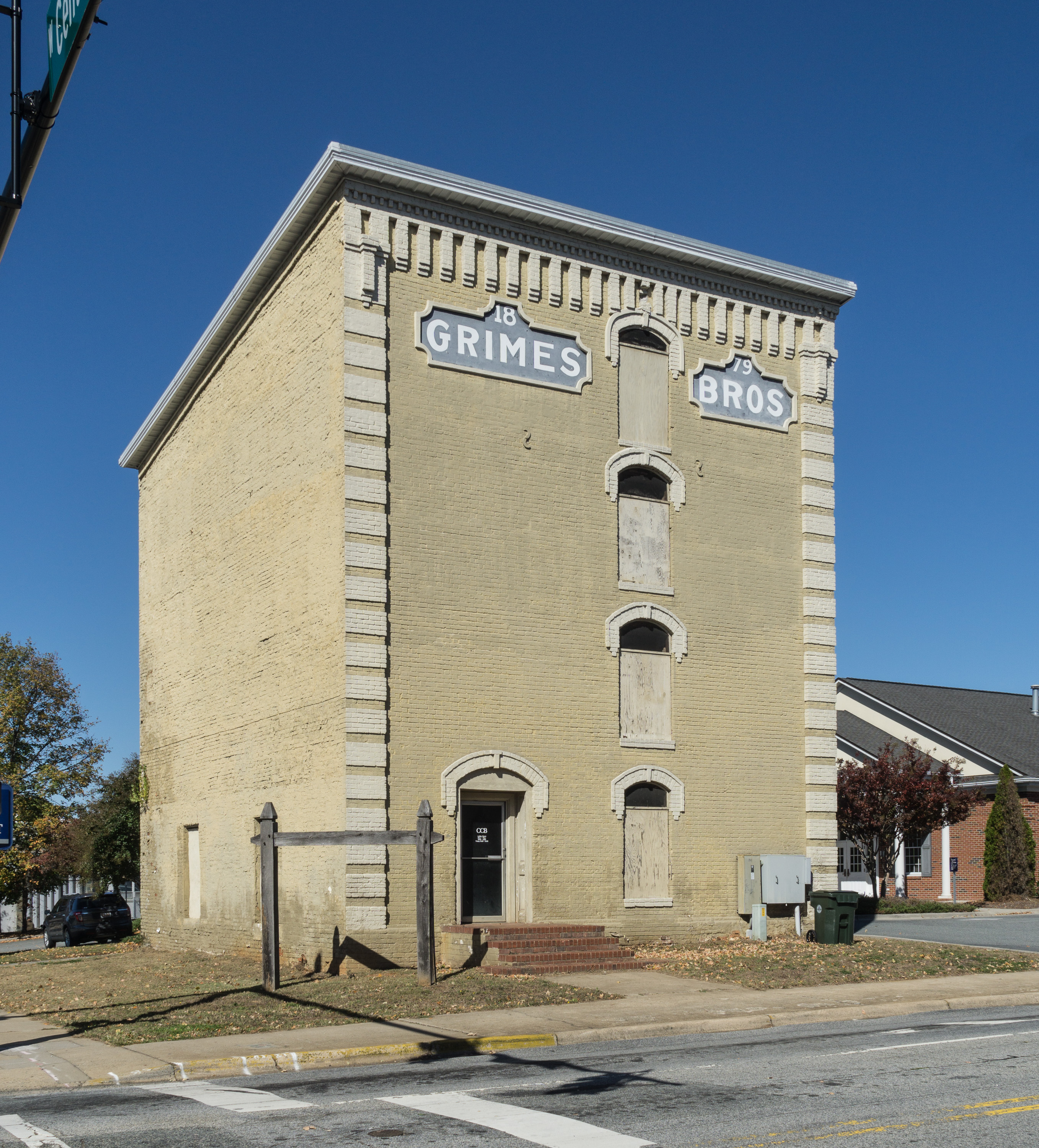

- Location within North Carolina Location within the United States
- Location: 2 North State St., Lexington, North Carolina
- Coordinates: 35°49′31″N 80°15′17″W
- Area: less than one acre
- Built: 1885
- Architectural style: Italianate
- NRHP reference No.: 02000443
- Added to NRHP: May 2, 2002

Grimes Brothers Mill, also known as Lexington Roller Mill and Excelsior Mill, is a historic flour mill located at Lexington, Davidson County, North Carolina. It was built about 1885, and is a four-story brick building with a basement. It measures approximately 34 feet by 40 feet and has a shallow-pitched shed roof. The mill remained in operation until about 1960, and the building was converted to bank use in the early 1960s.

It was added to the National Register of Historic Places in 2002.
