= Riley Everhart Farm and General Store =

Historic farm in North Carolina, United States

- U.S. National Register of Historic Places
- Location within North Carolina Location within the United States
- Nearest city: SR 1468, near Welcome, North Carolina
- Coordinates: 35°53′40″N 80°16′28″W
- Area: 97 acres (39 ha)
- Built: 1885
- Built by: Cecil, D. K.
- Architectural style: Italianate
- MPS: Davidson County MRA
- NRHP reference No.: 84002001
- Added to NRHP: July 10, 1984

Riley Everhart Farm and General Store is a historic farm and general store located near Welcome, Davidson County, North Carolina. The main house was built in 1885, and is an I-house that consists of a two-story, three-bay by two-bay, brick main block with a two-story rear ell with Italianate-style design elements. It has a one-story front porch and one-story porches on the ell. The Arnold General Store and Post Office is a tall, narrow two-story, three-bay, frame building with a gable roof. Also on the property are the contributing original brick dairy and wellhouse, original log barn, granary, gear house, corn crib, woodhouse, chicken house, and garage.

It was added to the National Register of Historic Places in 1984.
