= Lexington, North Carolina =

- City
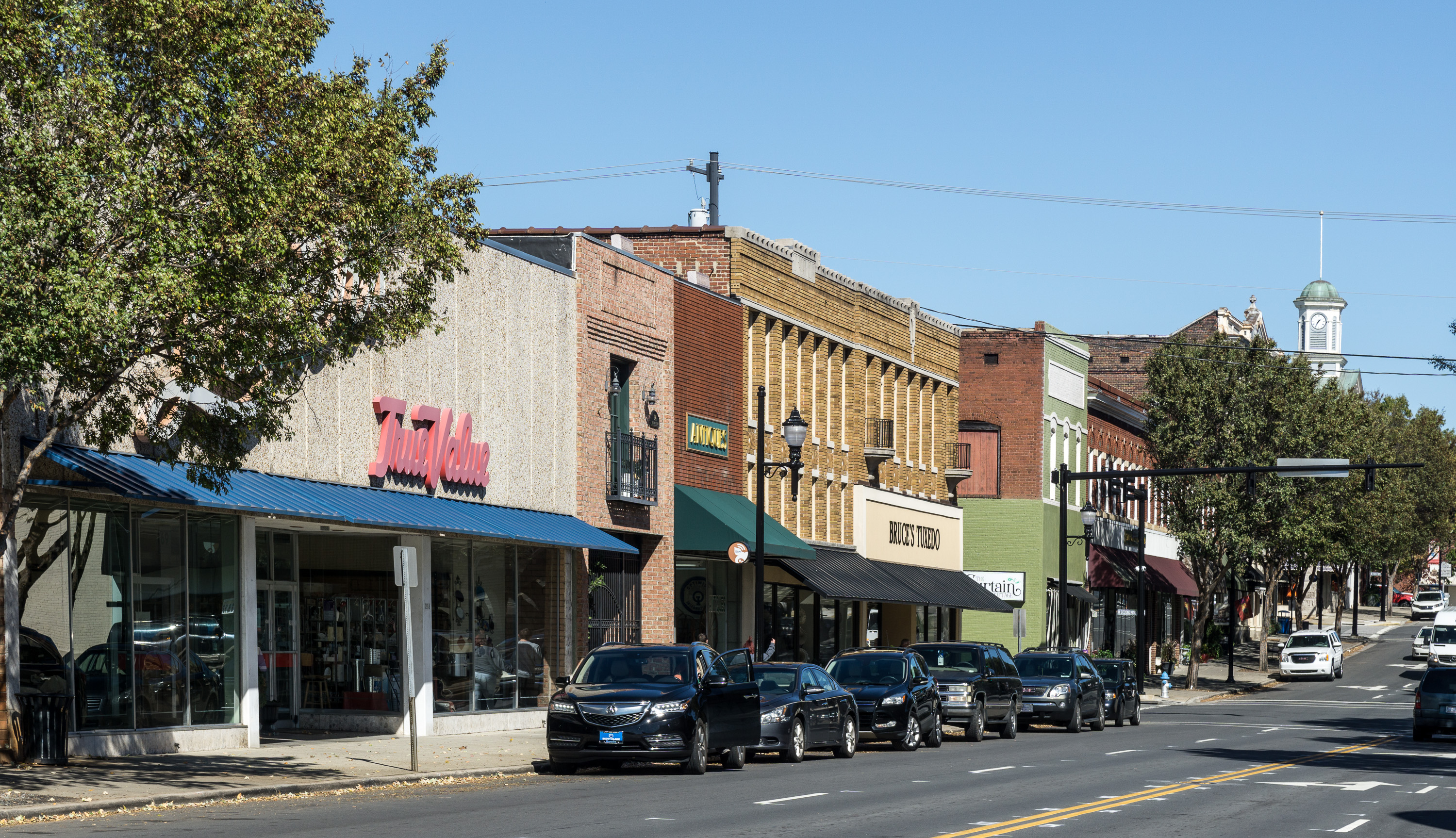
- South Main Street

- Seal
- Nickname: Barbecue Capital of the World
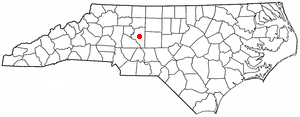
- Location in Davidson County and the state of North Carolina
- Coordinates: 35°47′50″N 80°16′27″W
- Country: United States
- State: North Carolina
- County: Davidson

Government
  - Type: Council-Manager government
  - Mayor: Jason Hayes

Area
  - Total: 19.22 sq mi (49.78 km^{2})
  - Land: 19.22 sq mi (49.78 km^{2})
  - Water: 0 sq mi (0.00 km^{2})
- Elevation: 728 ft (222 m)

Population (2020)
  - Total: 19,632
  - Density: 1,021.5/sq mi (394.39/km^{2})
- Time zone: UTC−5 (EST)
  - Summer (DST): UTC−4 (EDT)
- ZIP codes: 27292-27295
- Area code: 336
- FIPS code: 37-38060
- GNIS feature ID: 2404923
- Website: www.lexingtonnc.gov

Lexington is a city in and the county seat of Davidson County, North Carolina, United States. As of the 2020 census, the town had a population of 19,632. It is located in central North Carolina, 20 miles (32 km) south of Winston-Salem. Lexington is part of the Piedmont Triad region of the state.

Lexington has been noted as one of America's top four best cities for barbecue by U.S. News & World Report. The City calls itself the "Barbecue Capital of the World", and it hosts the annual Lexington Barbecue Festival.

Lexington, Thomasville, and the rural areas surrounding them are slowly developing as residential bedroom communities for nearby cities such as Winston-Salem, Greensboro, High Point and, to a lesser extent, Charlotte and its northeastern suburbs.

== History ==
The Lexington area was at least sparsely settled by Europeans in 1775. The settlers named their community in honor of Lexington, Massachusetts, the site of the first skirmish of the American Revolutionary War. Lexington was incorporated as a city in 1828. Silver Hill Mine, located a few miles south of Lexington, opened in 1838, and was the first operating silver mine in the country.

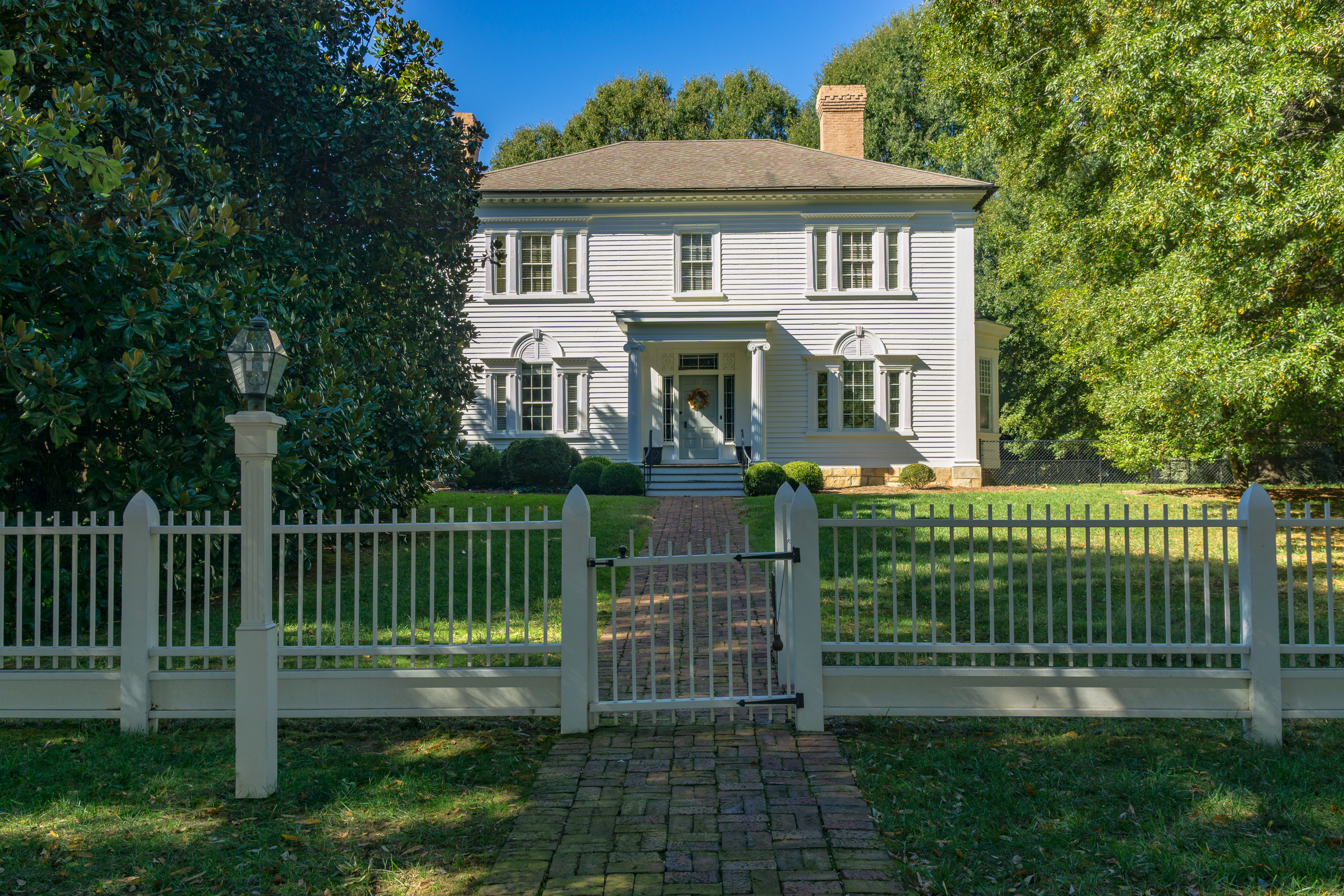
Lexington's oldest home, The Homestead, listed on the National Register of Historic Places.

The oldest surviving house in Lexington is The Homestead, built by Dr. William Rainey Holt (1798–1868), a physician born in what is today Alamance County. The Homestead has windows, sidelights and other Palladian details characteristic of the pattern books of architect Asher Benjamin.

In addition to The Homestead, the Erlanger Mill Village Historic District, First Reformed Church, Grace Episcopal Church, Grimes Brothers Mill, Grimes School, Hedrick's Grove Reformed Church, Junior Order United American Mechanics National Orphans Home, Lexington Memorial Hospital, Lexington Residential Historic District, Old Davidson County Courthouse, Pilgrim Reformed Church Cemetery, Henry Shoaf Farm, Uptown Lexington Historic District, and John Henry Welborn House are listed on the National Register of Historic Places.

== Business and industry ==
In the twentieth century until the late 1990s, Lexington's economy was mainly based on textile and furniture manufacturing. Since then, most local manufacturers have moved their production facilities to Asia and Mexico as a way to reduce costs and remain competitive in a global market. This caused the closure of most textile and furniture factories and contributed to economic difficulties for a community that was heavily dependent on these two industries for employment. The Lexington industrial portfolio has since diversified.

In 2023, Siemens Mobility announced that Lexington will be the home of their new railcar manufacturing facility. Siemens Mobility broke ground on the 220 acre facility in August, 2023 with construction estimated to be completed in Fall, 2024 with manufacturing to begin by October, 2024. This facility is going to manufacture railcar's as well as provide railcar and locomotive overhauling services on the east coast.

Other large employers include:

- Halyard Health
- Jeld-Wen
- PPG Industries
- Vitacost
- Siemens Mobility

== Culture ==
=== Barbecue ===
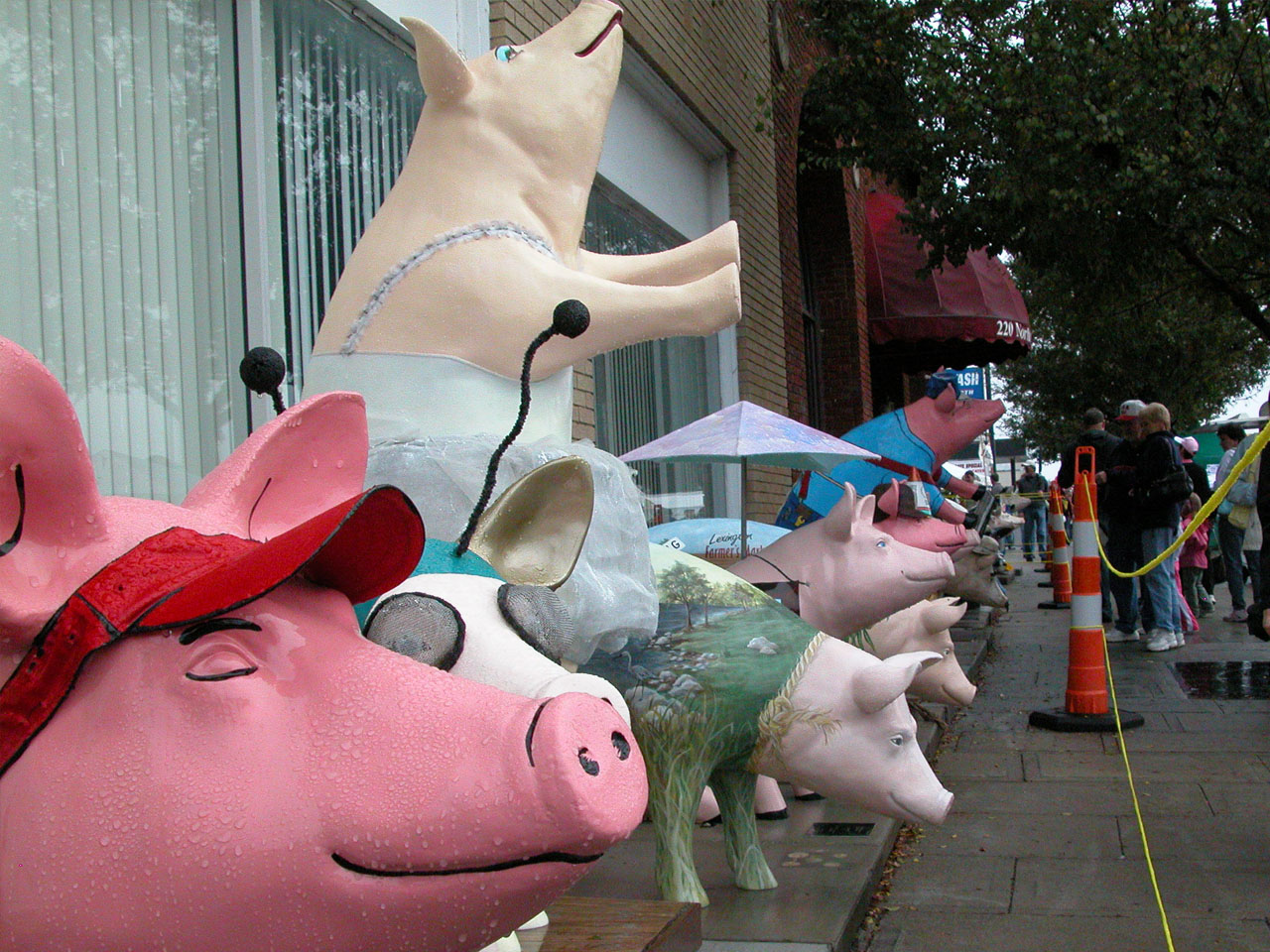
Pigs in the City and the Lexington Barbecue Festival bring in tourists from all over the country.

Lexington calls itself the "Barbecue Capital of the World". Since 1984, the city has hosted the Lexington Barbecue Festival, one of the largest street festivals in North Carolina. As of 2003, the city has over twenty barbecue restaurants, an average of more than one per thousand residents. In 2012, U.S. News & World Report ranked Lexington #4 on its list of the best cities for barbecue.

Lexington-style barbecue is made with pork shoulder cooked slowly over a hardwood fire, usually hickory. It is basted in a sauce (called "dip" locally) made with vinegar, ketchup, water, salt, pepper and other spices. The ingredients vary from restaurant to restaurant, with each restaurant's recipe being a closely guarded secret. While each is vinegar-based, the taste varies widely from tangy to slightly sweet or spicy.

The most distinguishing feature of the "Lexington Barbecue Sandwich" is the inclusion of red slaw (sometimes called "barbecue slaw"). Red slaw is a combination of cabbage, vinegar, ketchup and crushed/ground black pepper; it is distinguishable from coleslaw because it contains no mayonnaise. Many Lexingtonians (and visitors) consider red slaw a staple for a quality barbecue experience. Red slaw is commonly served as a side dish with barbecue, grilled poultry and other meats, and on hot dogs as a relish.

=== Pigs in the City ===
"Pigs in the City" is a public art initiative coordinated by Uptown Lexington, Inc., a non-profit organization created to revitalize the downtown area of Lexington. People paid commissions to artists to decorate life-sized sculptures of pigs, which were installed throughout the city. Pigs in the City began in 2003, and the event drew more than 40,000 visitors from all over the state in its first year. The cost to "sponsor" one of the 20 pigs on display was $1,000 during the first exhibition, which paid for the initiative. The event ran from 2003–2005, and 2008–2009. In 2019, it was announced that Pigs in the City will return in 2020.

=== High Rock Lake ===
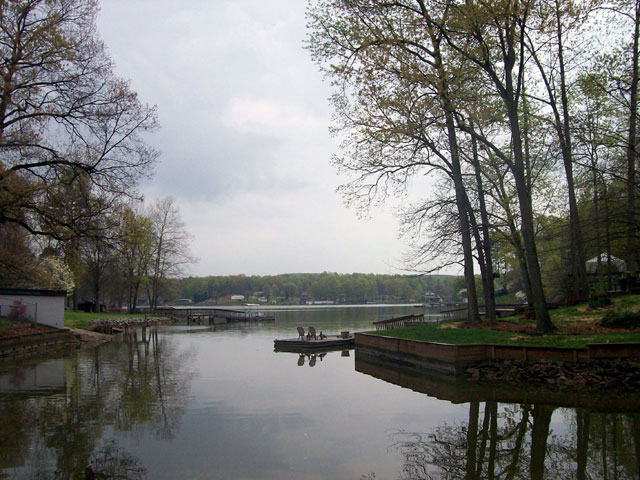
High Rock Lake

The second largest lake in North Carolina, High Rock Lake is located a few miles south of Lexington. Its water surface covers 15,180 acres (61 km^{2}), and it has 365 miles (587 km) of shoreline. It begins at the confluence of the Yadkin and South Yadkin rivers.

High Rock Lake has long been considered one of the best fishing lakes of North Carolina. It is the site of the Bassmaster Tournaments, including the Bassmaster Classic in 1994, 1995, 1997 and 2007 and frequently is used for other angling competitions. The lake is stocked with channel, blue, and flathead catfish, plus crappie and several different sunfish, such as bluegill, shellcracker and others. Striper and their hybrids, as well as white bass, are also abundant.

The lake is best known for its quantity and quality of largemouth bass, which attract anglers from all over the United States. This is likely due to the relatively shallow nature of the lake and the favorable habitat for the bass.

== Geography ==
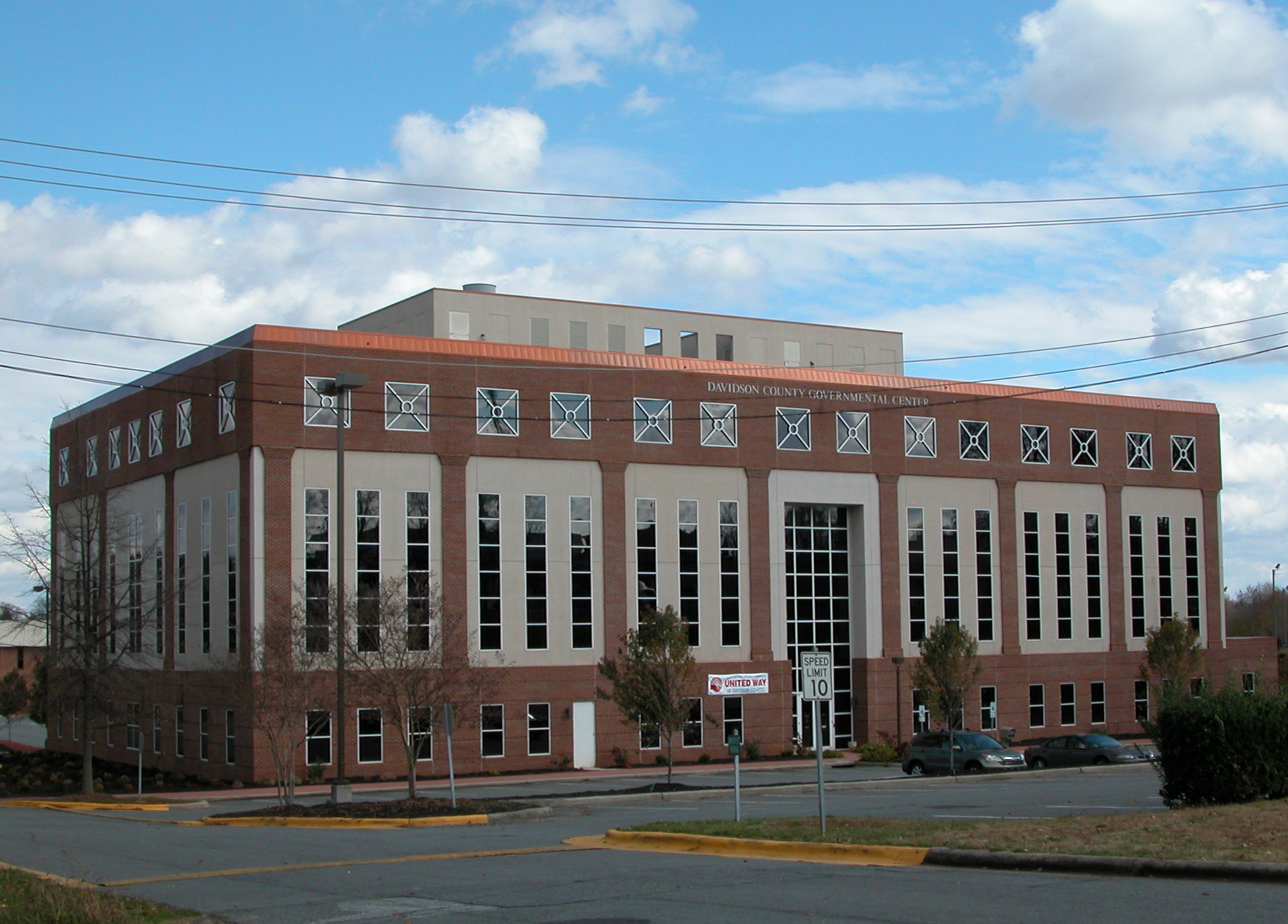
Davidson County Governmental Center

Lexington is located in the Piedmont Triad region. Lexington is 11 miles (18 km) northeast of High Rock Lake, part of the Yadkin-Pee Dee chain of lakes in central North Carolina.

According to the United States Census Bureau, the city has a total area of 18.0 square miles (46.6 km^{2}), all land.

Interstate 85 traverses the southeast edges of the city, with Interstate 285 giving access to Winston-Salem. The two merge, southwest of the core of the city. Additionally, four U.S. highways, U.S. Route 29, 64, 52, and 70, and state highways 8 and 47 intersect in the city.

=== Climate ===
Thunderstorms are common during the spring and summer months, including some severe storms. Located in central North Carolina, between the Appalachian Mountains and the Mid-Atlantic coast, Lexington has a humid subtropical climate, with moderate temperatures during spring and autumn and warm to hot summers. Winters are relatively mild and wet with highs typically in the 40s to 50s and overnight lows averaging just below freezing.

Climate data for Lexington, North Carolina
| Month | Jan | Feb | Mar | Apr | May | Jun | Jul | Aug | Sep | Oct | Nov | Dec | Year |
|---|---|---|---|---|---|---|---|---|---|---|---|---|---|
| Mean daily maximum °F (°C) | 49.6 (9.8) | 54.4 (12.4) | 63.3 (17.4) | 72.5 (22.5) | 79.3 (26.3) | 85.5 (29.7) | 89.1 (31.7) | 87.4 (30.8) | 81.6 (27.6) | 71.9 (22.2) | 61.7 (16.5) | 52.6 (11.4) | 70.7 (21.5) |
| Mean daily minimum °F (°C) | 28.6 (−1.9) | 30.9 (−0.6) | 38.0 (3.3) | 45.3 (7.4) | 54.5 (12.5) | 62.9 (17.2) | 67.1 (19.5) | 65.5 (18.6) | 59.1 (15.1) | 46.7 (8.2) | 37.9 (3.3) | 31.0 (−0.6) | 47.3 (8.5) |
| Average precipitation inches (mm) | 4.06 (103) | 3.78 (96) | 4.31 (109) | 3.63 (92) | 3.93 (100) | 4.06 (103) | 3.85 (98) | 3.63 (92) | 3.84 (98) | 3.52 (89) | 3.47 (88) | 3.37 (86) | 45.45 (1,154) |
| Average snowfall inches (cm) | 2.4 (6.1) | 2.8 (7.1) | 1.2 (3.0) | 0 (0) | 0 (0) | 0 (0) | 0 (0) | 0 (0) | 0 (0) | 0 (0) | 0 (0) | 0.6 (1.5) | 7 (17.7) |
| Average precipitation days | 10.2 | 9.3 | 10.2 | 9.0 | 10.0 | 9.5 | 10.4 | 8.4 | 7.7 | 6.6 | 8.8 | 9.6 | 109.7 |
| Average snowy days | 0.8 | 0.9 | 0.4 | 0 | 0 | 0 | 0 | 0 | 0 | 0 | 0 | 0.3 | 2.4 |
| Mean monthly sunshine hours | 170.5 | 175.2 | 229.4 | 246.0 | 260.4 | 270.0 | 269.7 | 248.0 | 225.0 | 220.1 | 174.0 | 164.3 | 2,652.6 |
Source: NOAA, HKO (sun)

== Demographics ==
Historical population
| Census | Pop. | Note | %± |
|---|---|---|---|
| 1870 | 475 | | — |
| 1880 | 475 | | 0.0% |
| 1890 | 626 | | 31.8% |
| 1900 | 1,440 | | 130.0% |
| 1910 | 4,163 | | 189.1% |
| 1920 | 5,234 | | 25.7% |
| 1930 | 9,652 | | 84.4% |
| 1940 | 10,550 | | 9.3% |
| 1950 | 13,571 | | 28.6% |
| 1960 | 16,093 | | 18.6% |
| 1970 | 17,205 | | 6.9% |
| 1980 | 15,711 | | −8.7% |
| 1990 | 16,581 | | 5.5% |
| 2000 | 19,953 | | 20.3% |
| 2010 | 18,931 | | −5.1% |
| 2020 | 19,632 | | 3.7% |
| 2025 (est.) | 20,238 | ▲ | 3.1% |
U.S. Decennial Census

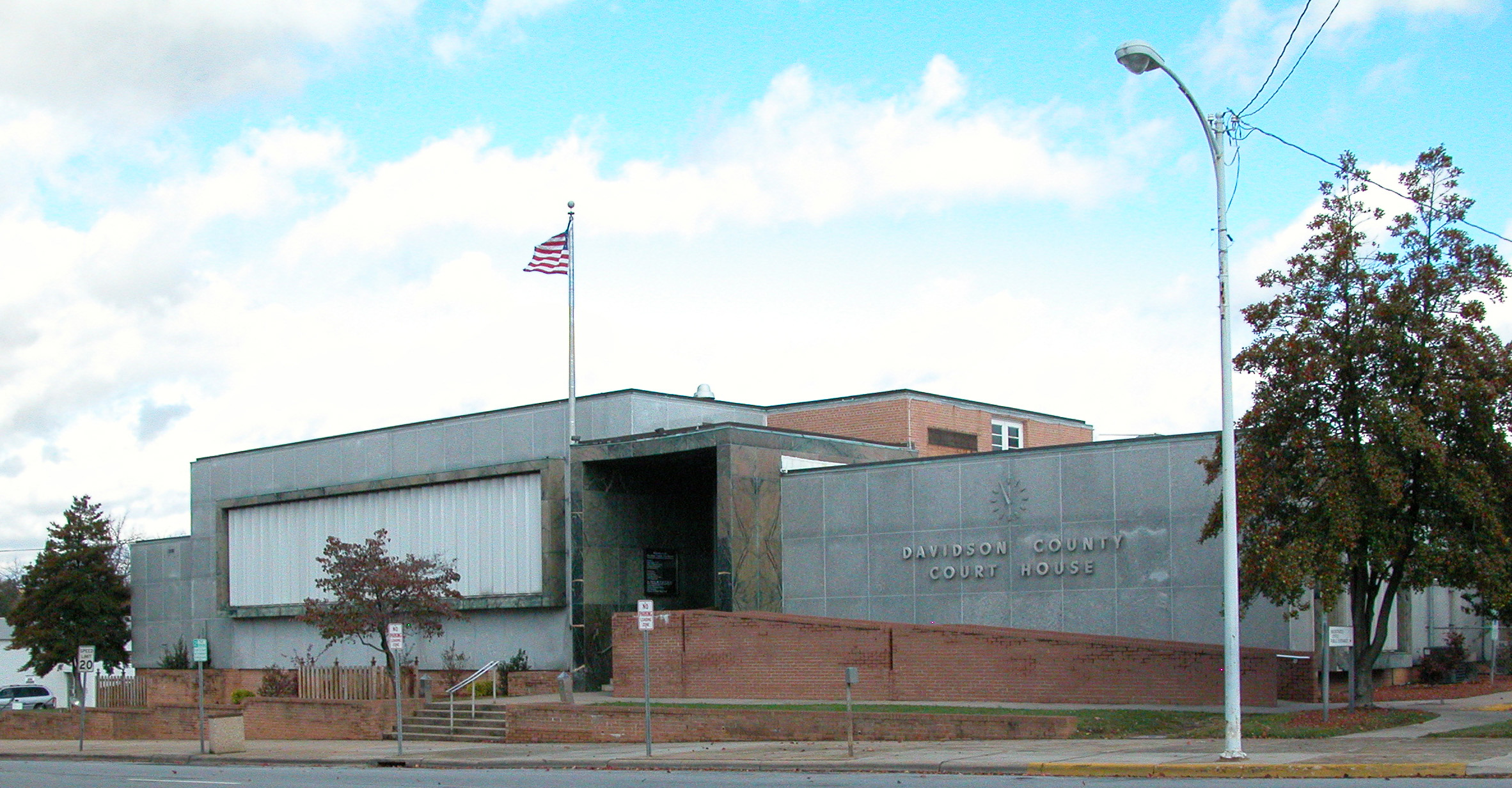
Davidson County Courthouse

=== 2020 census ===
As of the 2020 census, Lexington had a population of 19,632. The median age was 39.2 years; 23.0% of residents were under the age of 18 and 16.8% were 65 years of age or older. For every 100 females there were 92.0 males, and for every 100 females age 18 and over there were 89.6 males age 18 and over.

97.4% of residents lived in urban areas, while 2.6% lived in rural areas.

There were 7,832 households in Lexington, including 4,607 families; 29.9% had children under the age of 18 living in them. Of all households, 33.6% were married-couple households, 20.4% were households with a male householder and no spouse or partner present, and 37.8% were households with a female householder and no spouse or partner present. About 33.3% of all households were made up of individuals and 14.0% had someone living alone who was 65 years of age or older.

There were 8,906 housing units, of which 12.1% were vacant. The homeowner vacancy rate was 2.7% and the rental vacancy rate was 9.9%.

Racial composition as of the 2020 census
| Race | Number | Percent |
|---|---|---|
| White | 9,642 | 49.1% |
| Black or African American | 5,483 | 27.9% |
| American Indian and Alaska Native | 215 | 1.1% |
| Asian | 586 | 3.0% |
| Native Hawaiian and Other Pacific Islander | 6 | 0.0% |
| Some other race | 2,176 | 11.1% |
| Two or more races | 1,524 | 7.8% |
| Hispanic or Latino (of any race) | 3,454 | 17.6% |

=== 2010 census ===
As of the census of 2010, there were 18,931 people in the city, organized into 7,376 households. This represents a population reduction of 1022 persons, or 5%, when compared to the 2000 census. The median age was 37.4 years for all persons (39.4 for females, 35.2 for males).

Of the total population, 15.1% were at least 65 years old, 24.6% were under the age of 18, with the remaining 60.3% of the population being persons from 18 to 64. Males comprise 48.1% and females make up 51.9% of the total population. Caucasians make up 54.7% of the total population (including 16.3% who were Latino), African-Americans 28.4% and Asians represent 2.9% of the population. Fully 10.7% of the population identifies themselves as some other race, while 2.6% were of two or more races. Other races each represent less than 1% each of the total population.

Of the total 7,376 households, 4,581 were considered family households, including 2067 that had children under 18. The average household size was 2.44 persons, and the average family size was 3.08 persons. There were 8,938 total housing units, of which the 7376 were households, for an occupancy rate of 82.5%. 47.6% of these households were owner-occupied, while 52.4% were renters.

=== 2000 census ===
According to the 2000 census, The median income for a household in the city was $26,226, and the median income for a family was $32,339. Males had a median income of $25,555 versus $20,939 for females. The per capita income for the city was $15,310. 21.2% of the population and 16.7% of families were below the poverty line. Out of the total population, 31.7% of those under the age of 18 and 18.0% of those 65 and older were living below the poverty line. The global outsourcing of textile and furniture manufacturing has negatively impacted Lexington's economy.

== Education ==
The vast majority of Lexington is in the Lexington City Schools school district. Some outerlying portions of the municipality to the south and southwest are in the Davidson County Schools school district.

== Notable people ==
- Josh Bush (born 1989), former free safety for the Denver Broncos and New York Jets. Was on the Denver Broncos Super Bowl 50 championship team.
- Mike Dillon, former NASCAR Busch Series race car driver
- Lee Hall (1934–2017), abstract painter, educator, writer, university president.
- Richard Benjamin Harrison, star of the reality television series Pawn Stars
- Rick Harrison, star of the reality television series Pawn Stars
- Deems May (born 1969), former NFL tight end for the San Diego Chargers and the Seattle Seahawks
- Joe McIntosh, NFL player
- Terry McMillan, musician
- Benjamin Merrill, leader in the Regulator Movement who assumed command of the Regulators at the May 9, 1771 Battle of Alamance, a precursor uprising to the American War for Independence.
- Jeffrey Patneau – CIA officer killed in Yemen in 2008 and later remembered on CIA Memorial Wall
- Robert Sink, lieutenant general for the United States Army; commanded the 506th Parachute Infantry Regiment during World War II, which was made famous by the HBO miniseries Band of Brothers
- Caskey Swaim, actor, starred in the television series, Project U.F.O.
- Johnny Temple, six-time All-Star and former MLB second baseman for the Cincinnati Reds, Cleveland Indians, Baltimore Orioles, and Houston Colt .45s
- Rick Terry, NFL defensive tackle for the New York Jets and Carolina Panthers
- Bob Timberlake, realist artist
- Perry Tuttle, former NFL wide receiver for the Buffalo Bills, Atlanta Falcons, and Tampa Bay Buccaneers
- Wednesday 13 (Joseph Poole), horror punk musician

== Image gallery ==
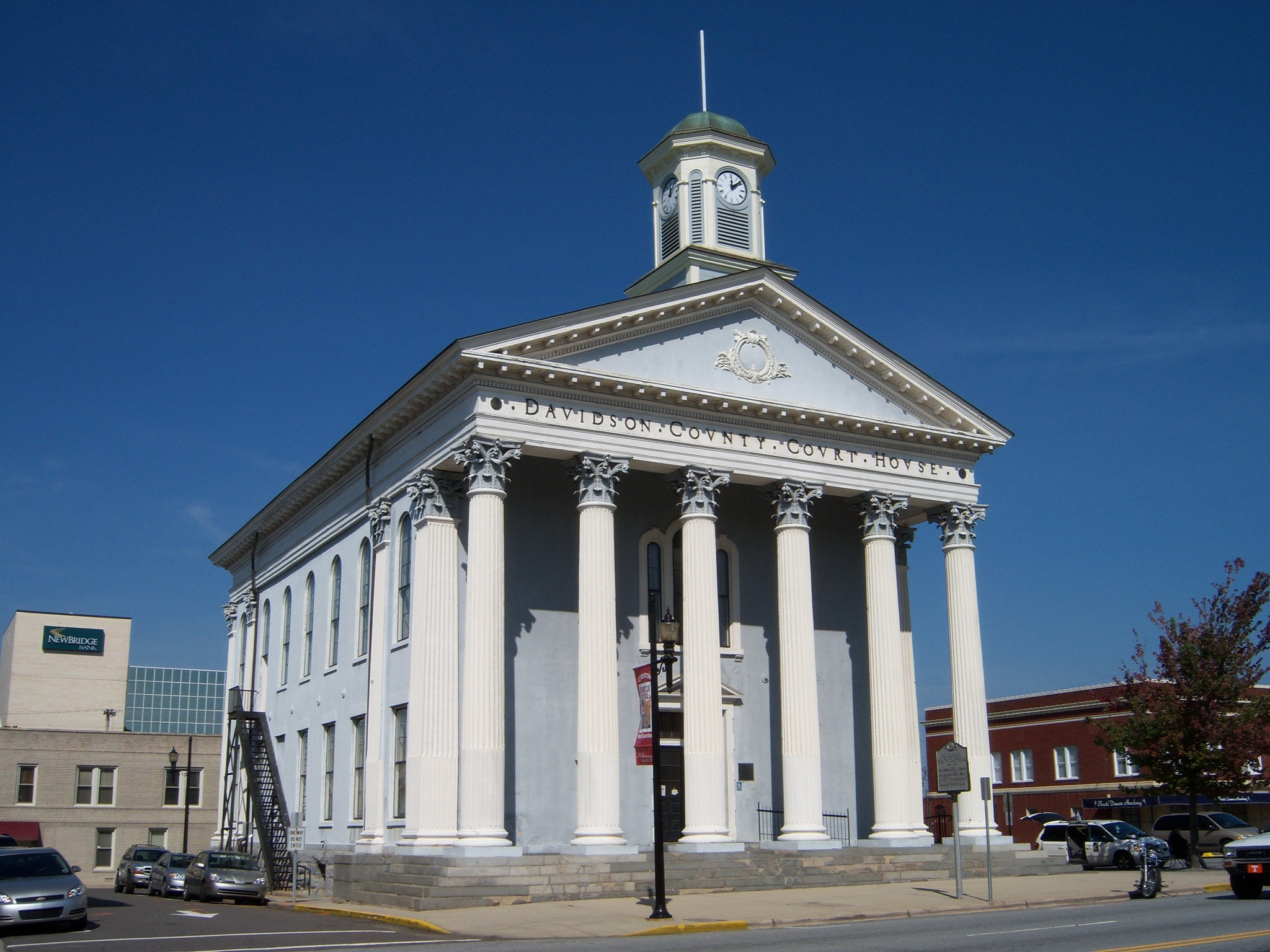
Historic Old Davidson County Courthouse

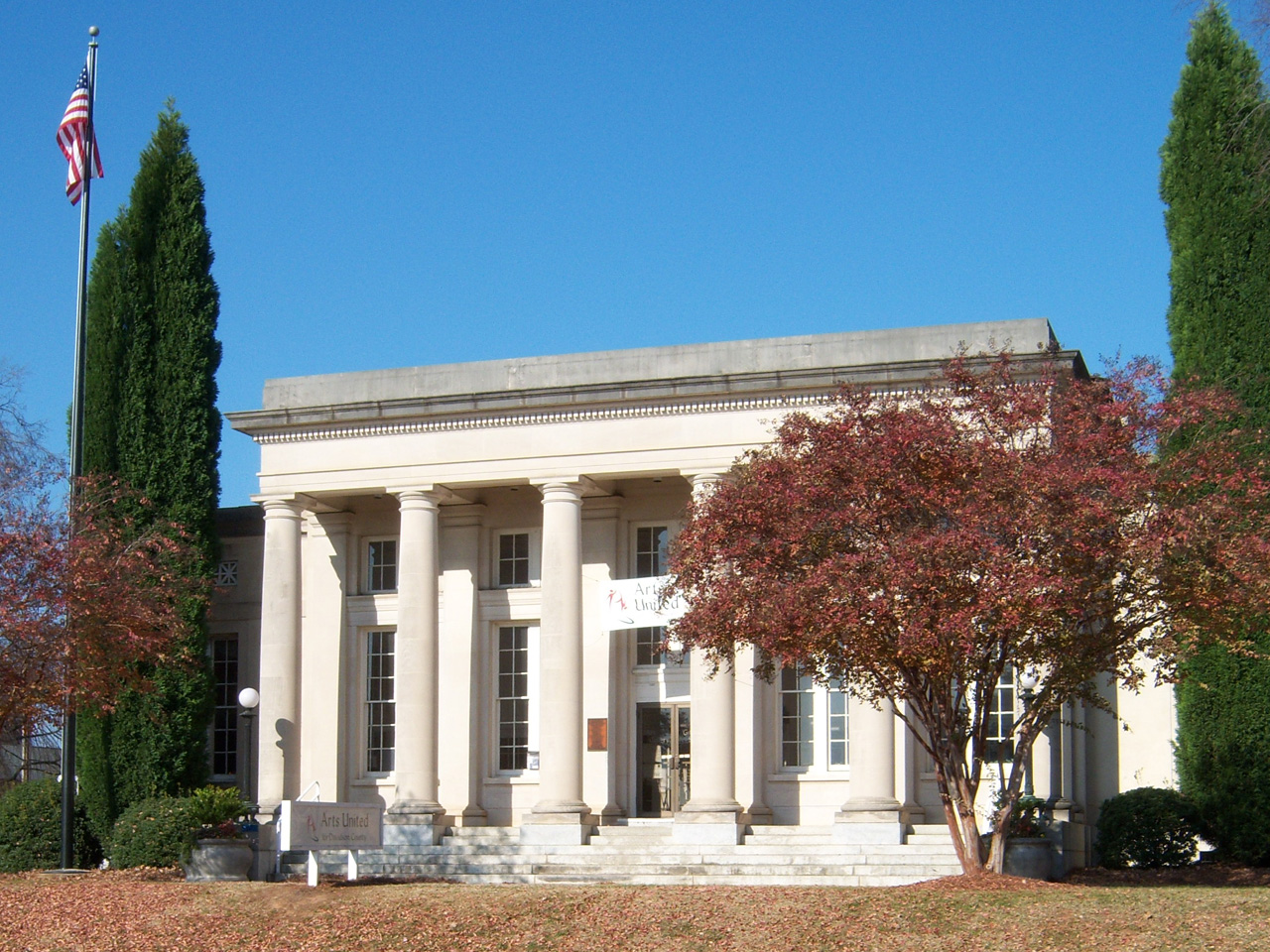
Old Lexington Post Office

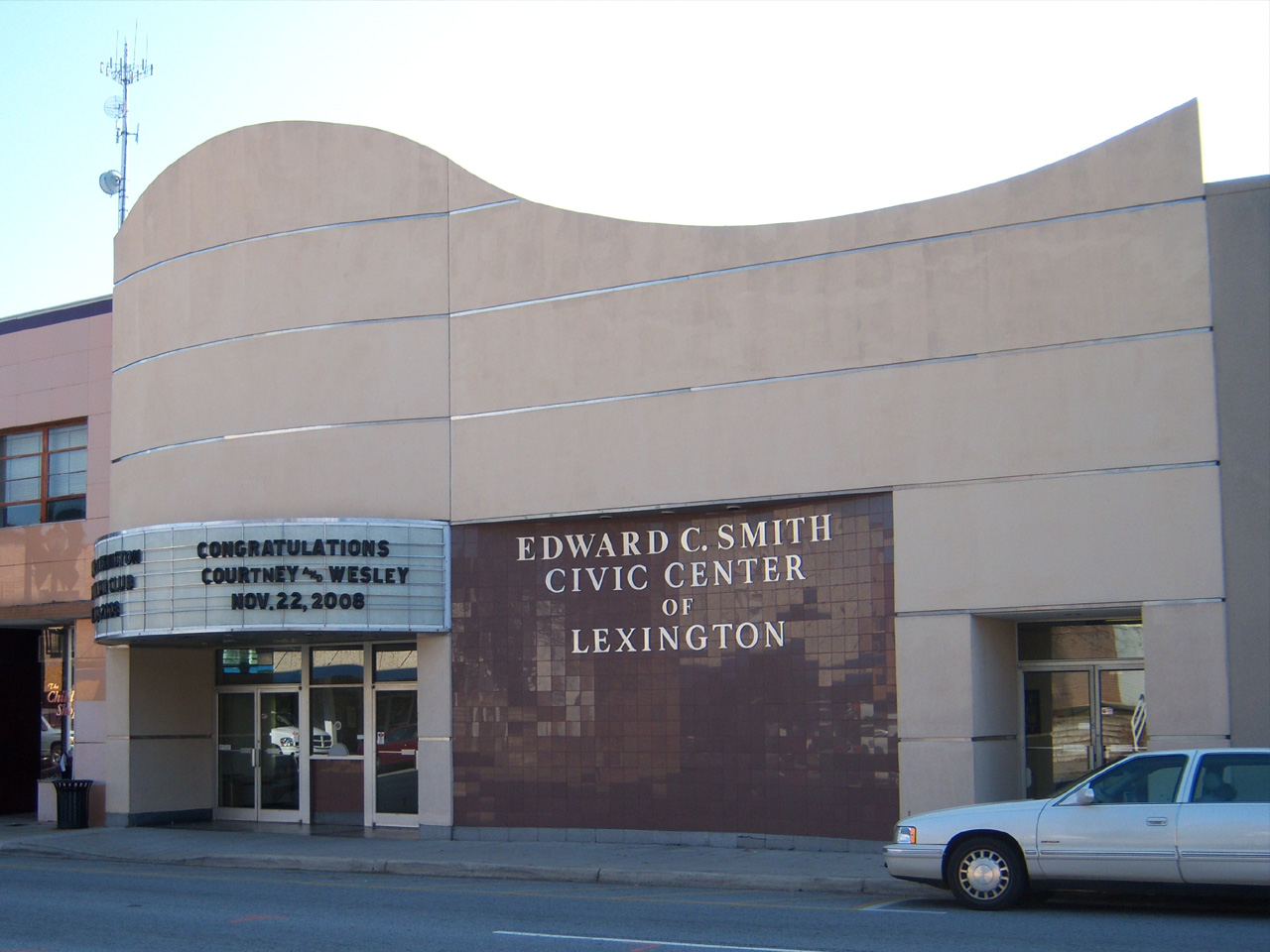
Edward C. Smith Civic Center

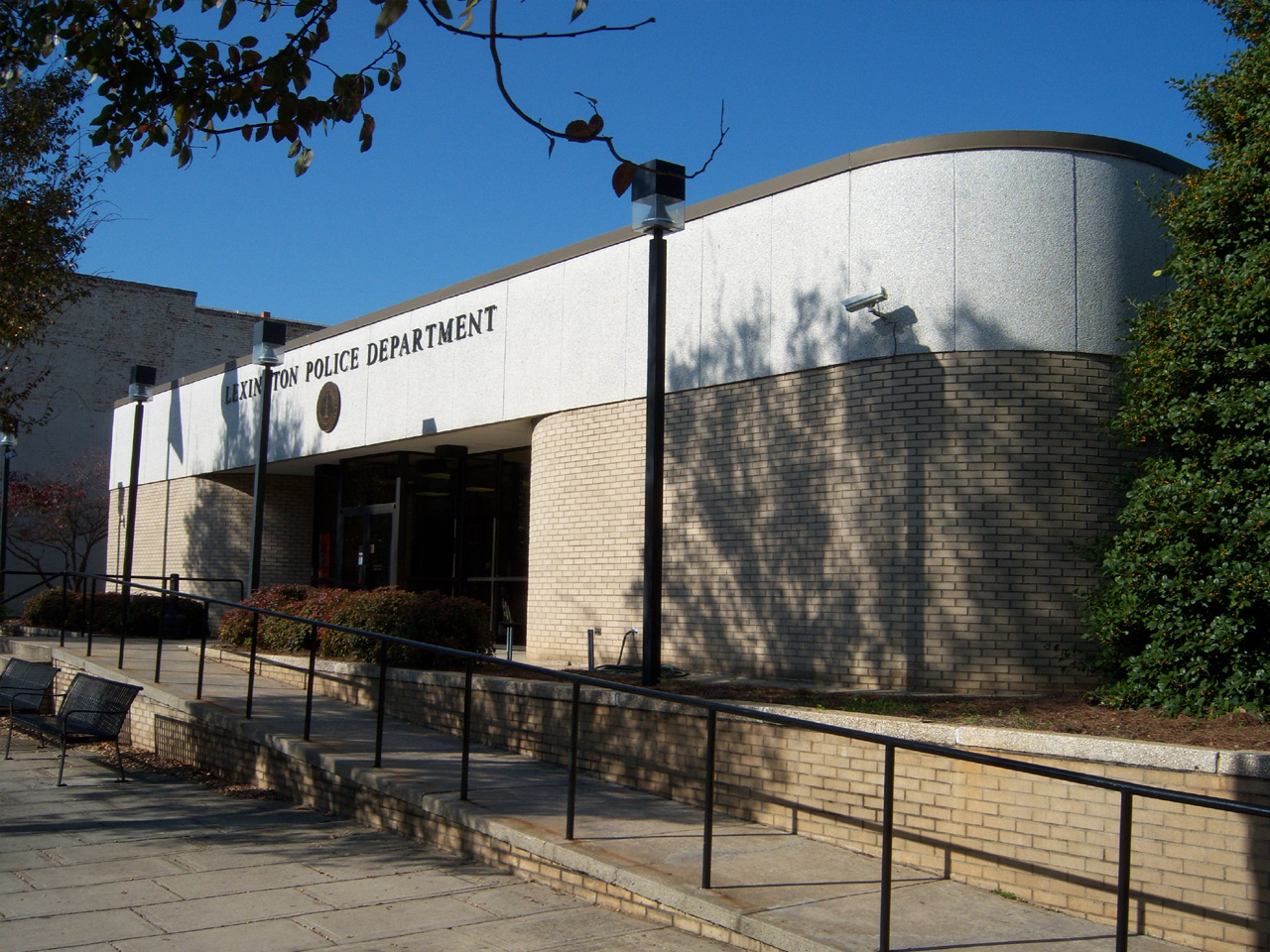
Police HQ

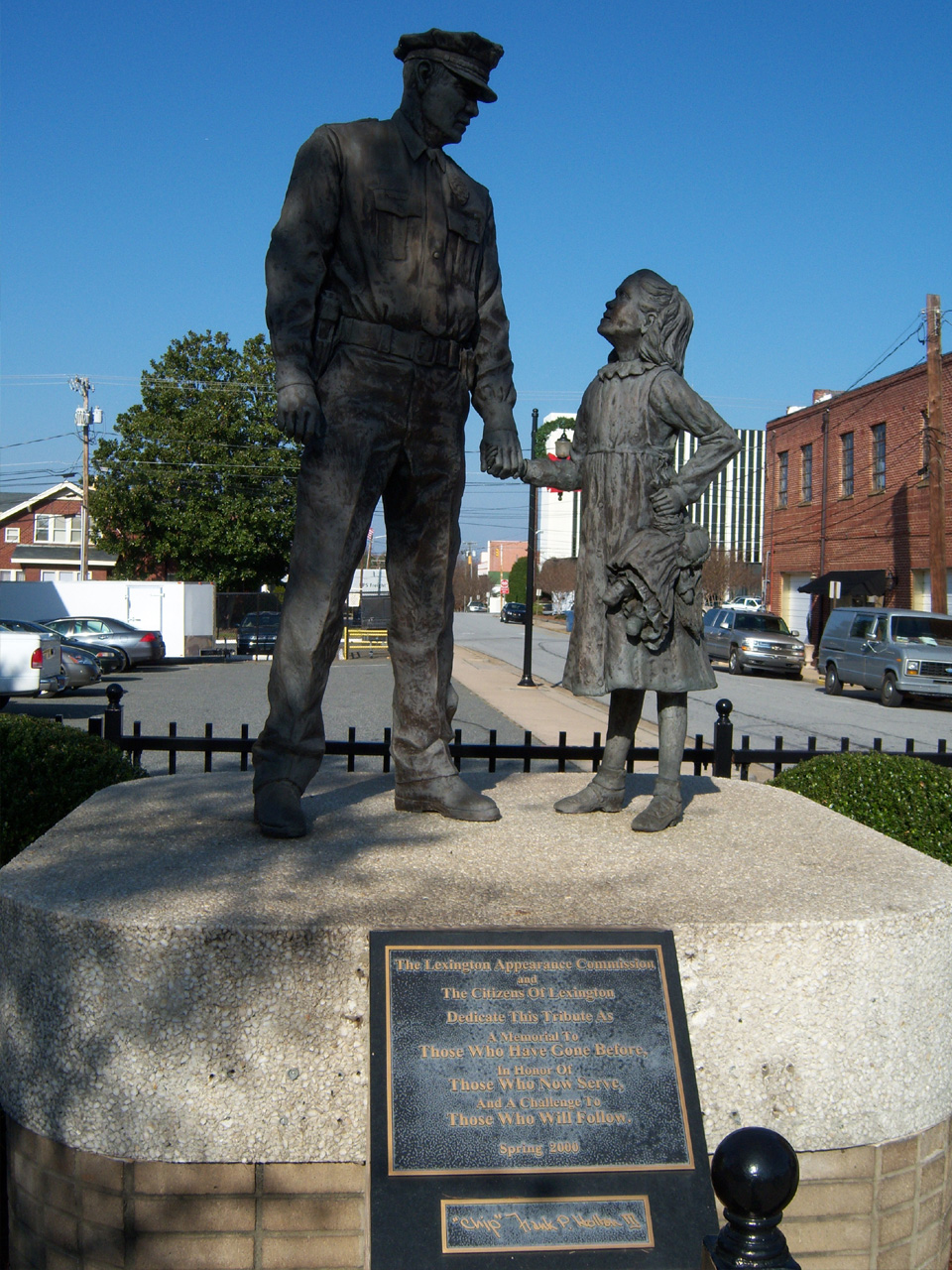
Statue at Police HQ

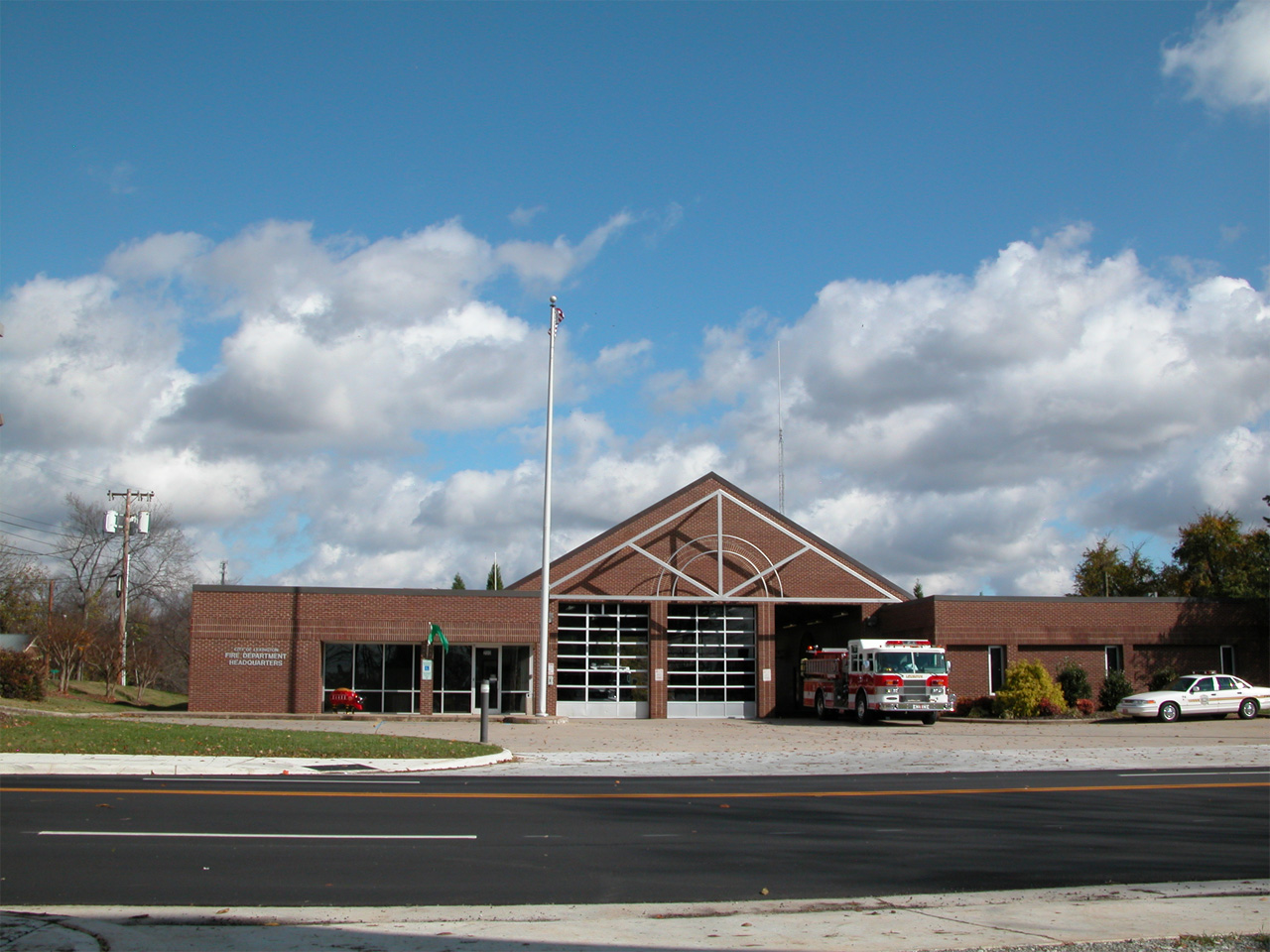
Fire Dept. HQ

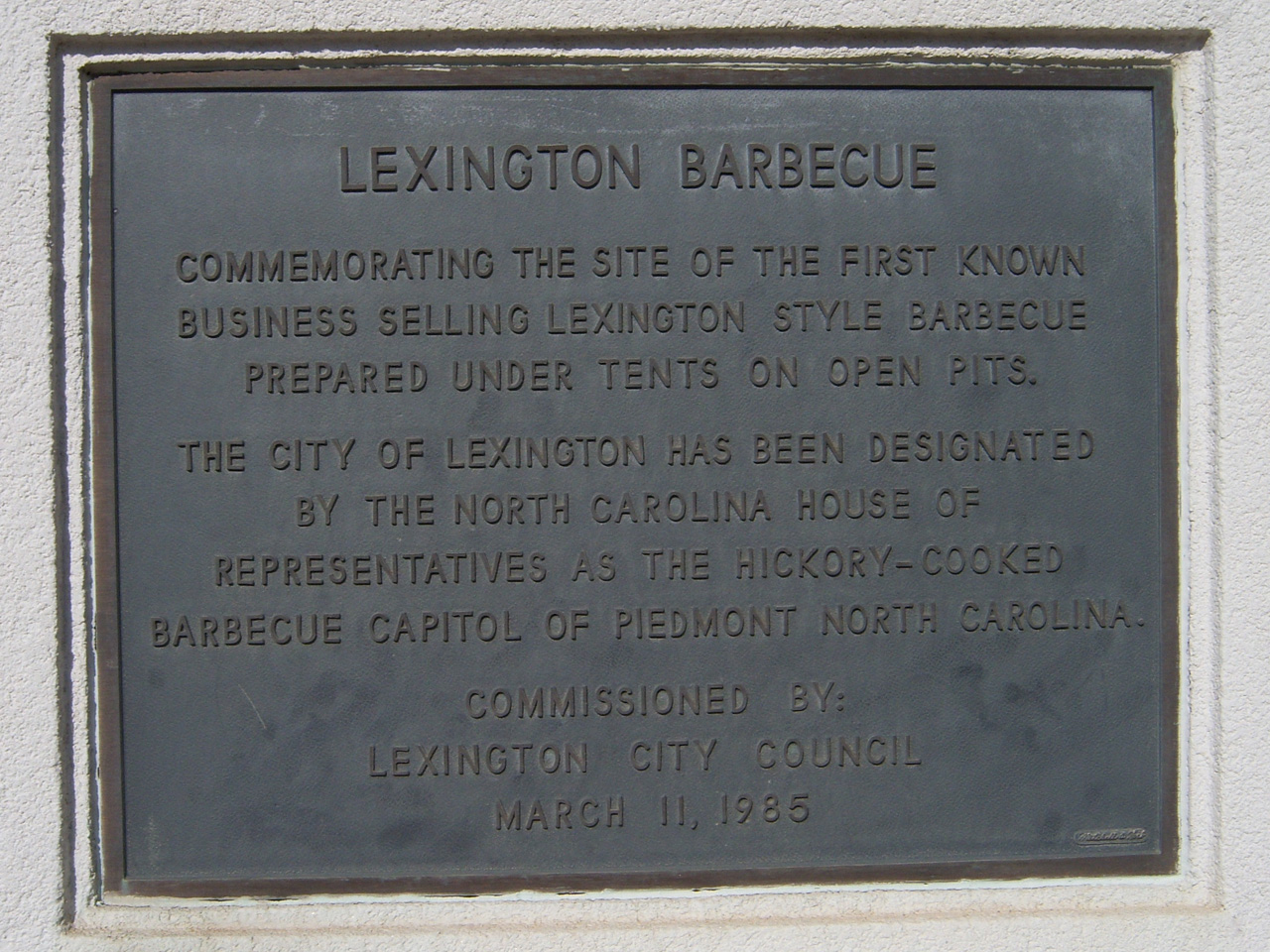
Barbecue designation sign on Mayor's building

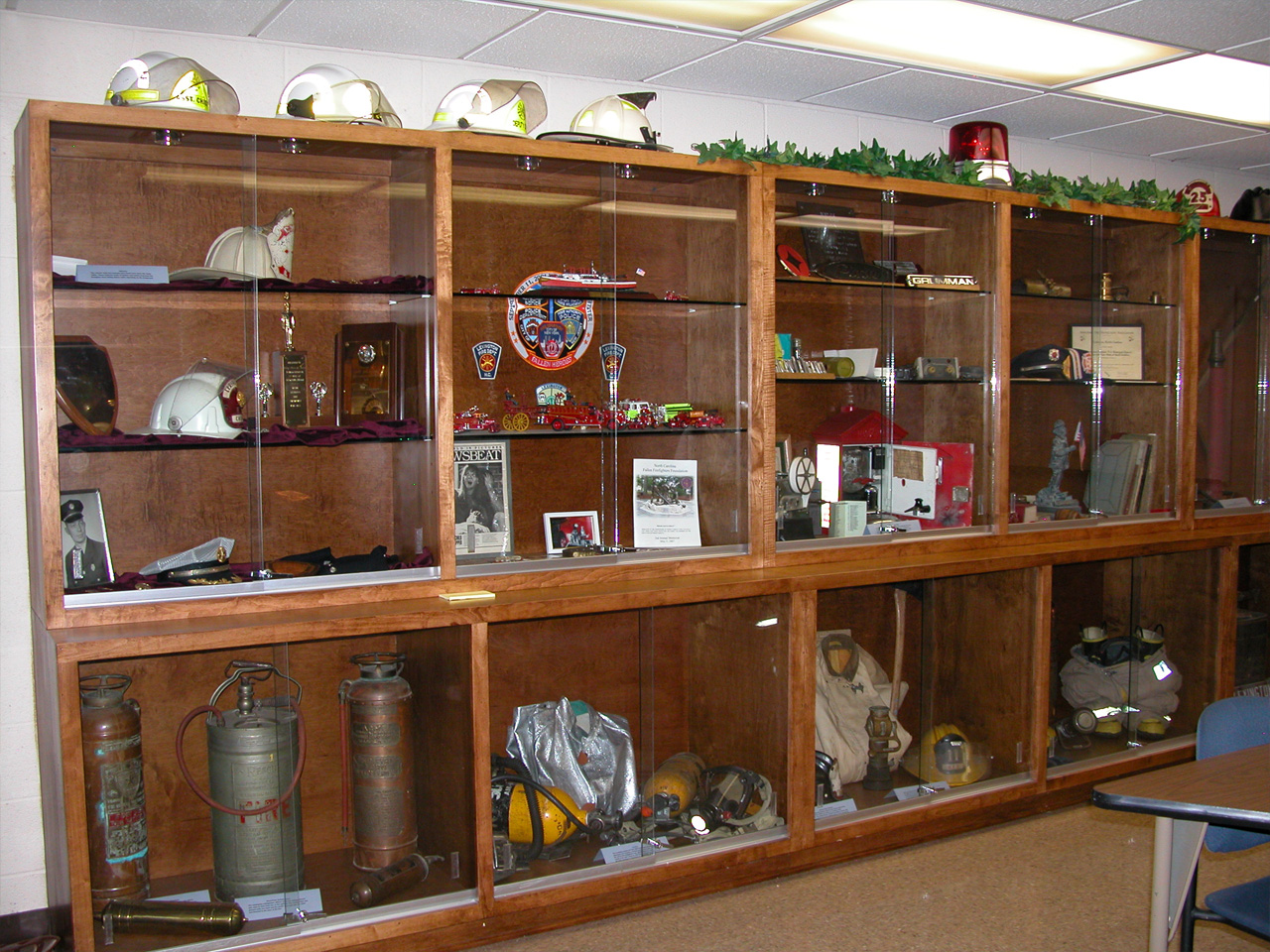
Part of the museum at the Fire Dept. HQ

== See also ==
- Uptown Lexington Historic District
- Barbecue in North Carolina
- Piedmont Triad
