= Junior Order United American Mechanics National Orphans Home (Lexington, North Carolina) =

Historic school building

- Junior Order United American Mechanics Children's Home
- U.S. National Register of Historic Places
- Location within North Carolina Location within the United States
- Nearest city: NC 8, near Lexington, North Carolina
- Coordinates: 35°45′49″N 80°16′38″W
- Area: 225 acres (91 ha)
- Built: 1925-1932
- Architect: Hunter, Herbert
- Architectural style: Colonial Revival
- MPS: Davidson County MRA
- NRHP reference No.: 84002034
- Added to NRHP: July 10, 1984

Junior Order United American Mechanics Children's Home, DBA American Children's Home, is a historic Junior Order of United American Mechanics orphanage located near Lexington, Davidson County, North Carolina. The complex was designed by architect Herbert B. Hunter and consists of five major buildings built between 1925 and 1932. The complex is modeled after the University of Virginia. The Colonial Revival-style buildings include Administration Building (1927), the Pennsylvania Building ("Pioneer Cottage"), the South Carolina Building (now the Children's Emergency Shelter), the North Carolina Building, and the Samuel F. Vance Auditorium (1932). The Administration Building features brick walls that are laid in Flemish bond.

It was added to the National Register of Historic Places in 1984.
