= Pilgrim Reformed Church Cemetery =

Historic cemetery in North Carolina, United States

- U.S. National Register of Historic Places
- Location within North Carolina Location within the United States
- Location: SR 1843, near Lexington, North Carolina
- Coordinates: 35°51′10″N 80°13′3″W
- Area: 3 acres (1.2 ha)
- Architect: Multiple
- MPS: Anglo-German Cemeteries TR
- NRHP reference No.: 84002145
- Added to NRHP: July 10, 1984

Pilgrim Reformed Church Cemetery is a historic church cemetery located near Lexington, Davidson County, North Carolina. It is associated with Pilgrim Reformed Church, founded about 1757 by a man of the name Valentine Leonhardt. The cemetery contains approximately 350 burials, with the earliest gravestone dated to 1781. It features a unique collection of folk gravestones crafted by local stonecutters, erected in Davidson County in the late 18th and first half of the 19th centuries. The church was the first Pilgrim church in North Carolina.

The cemetery was listed on the National Register of Historic Places in 1984.
