= Dr. William Rainey Holt House =

Historic house in North Carolina, United States

- U.S. National Register of Historic Places
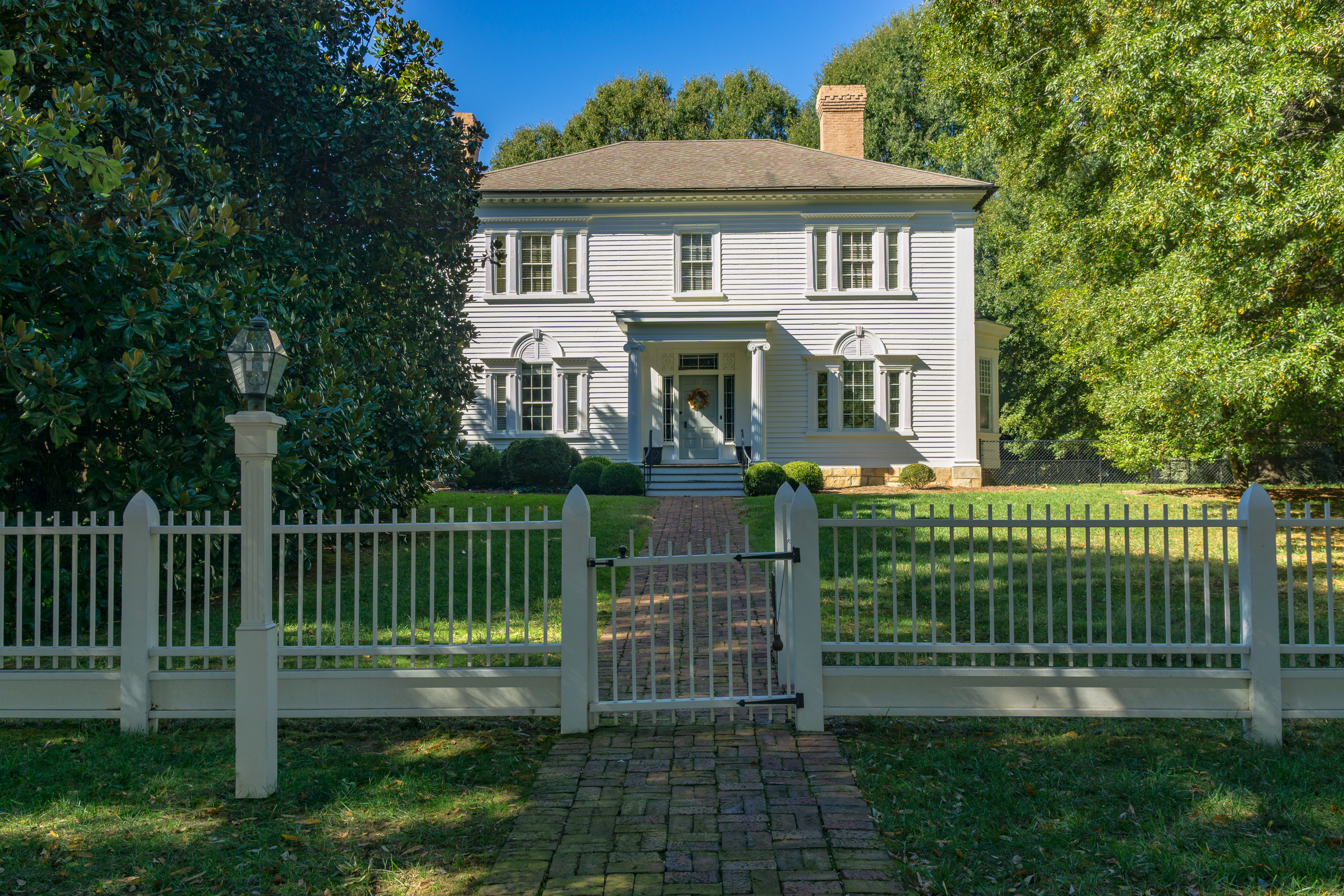

- Location within North Carolina Location within the United States
- Location: 408 S. Main St., Lexington, North Carolina
- Coordinates: 35°49′15″N 80°15′27″W
- Area: 1.1 acres (0.45 ha)
- Built: 1834
- Architectural style: Greek Revival
- NRHP reference No.: 83001876
- Added to NRHP: June 23, 1983

Dr. William Rainey Holt House, also known as The Homestead, is a historic home located at 408 South Main Street Lexington, Davidson County, North Carolina.

== History and description ==
The house was built in 1834, and is a two-story, three-bay, Greek Revival style frame dwelling with a hipped roof. It features Palladian windows and has a double-pile center-hall plan. It was remodeled about 1892 and 1900, and a rear addition was added in 1949. Also on the property is the contributing former servants quarters called by the Holt family "Lizzie's house".

The Homestead has windows, sidelights and other Palladian details characteristic of the pattern books of architect Asher Benjamin.

It was added to the National Register of Historic Places in 1983.

== William Rainey Holt ==
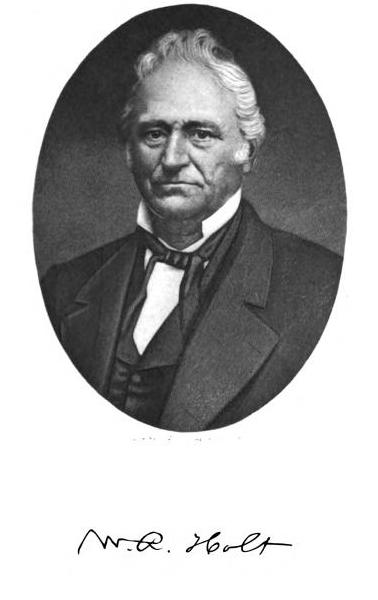
Dr. William Rainey Holt

William Rainey Holt was a Pennsylvania-trained physician who practiced medicine after relocating to Davidson County. An ardent secessionist, Dr. Holt had three sons killed during military service for the Confederacy in the Civil War. His home was occupied by Union Army soldiers.

Following the war, Holt spent an increasing amount of time at his plantation Linwood, located southwest of Lexington, where he operated a scientific farm on his 1,600 acres (6.5 km^{2}). As president of the North Carolina Agricultural Society, Holt was among the first to introduce purebred breeds of livestock to the state.
