= Lexington Residential Historic District =

Historic district in North Carolina, United States

- U.S. National Register of Historic Places
- U.S. Historic district
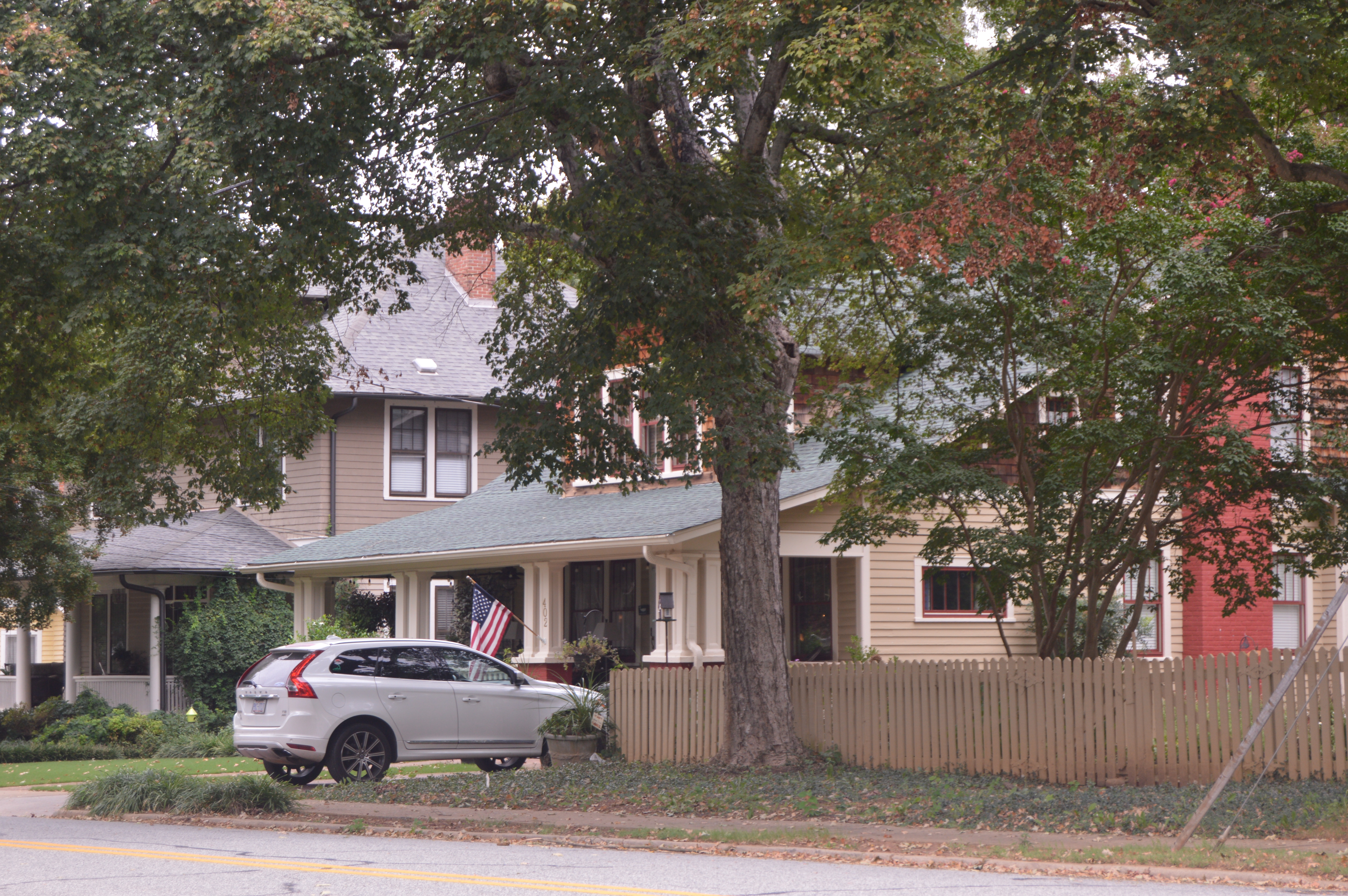
- Houses on Second Street

- Location within North Carolina Location within the United States
- Location: Roughly bounded by State St., W. Fifth St., Martin St., Westside Dr., Southbound St., and W. Ninth Ave., Lexington, North Carolina
- Coordinates: 35°49′34″N 80°15′34″W
- Area: 264 acres (107 ha)
- Architect: Joseph T. Levesque, Earle Sumner Draper
- Architectural style: Queen Anne, Bungalow/craftsman
- NRHP reference No.: 07000350
- Added to NRHP: April 19, 2007

Lexington Residential Historic District is a national historic district located at Lexington, Davidson County, North Carolina. The district encompasses 804 contributing buildings, 1 contributing site, and 1 contributing structure in a predominantly residential section of Lexington. They were built between about 1854 and 1957, and include notable examples of Queen Anne and Bungalow / American Craftsman style architecture. The subdivisions in the district are Park Place, Robbins Heights, Courtenay, Rosemary Park, Hillcrest, Oak Crest, and Westover Heights; along with the Lexington City Cemetery. Notable buildings include Hillside (1854), Brookshire House (1900), Wennonah Mill houses (1910), N. Earl and Daphne Rose House (c. 1920), Charles M. and Jean Wall House (c. 1926), Parkview Apartments (c. 1927, 1930), Lexington Shirt Corporation Factory/Hulin Lumber Company (c. 1927, 1955), and Nicholson Supermarket (c. 1951).

It was added to the National Register of Historic Places in 2007.
