= T. Austin and Ernestine L. Finch House =

Historic house in North Carolina, United States

- U.S. National Register of Historic Places
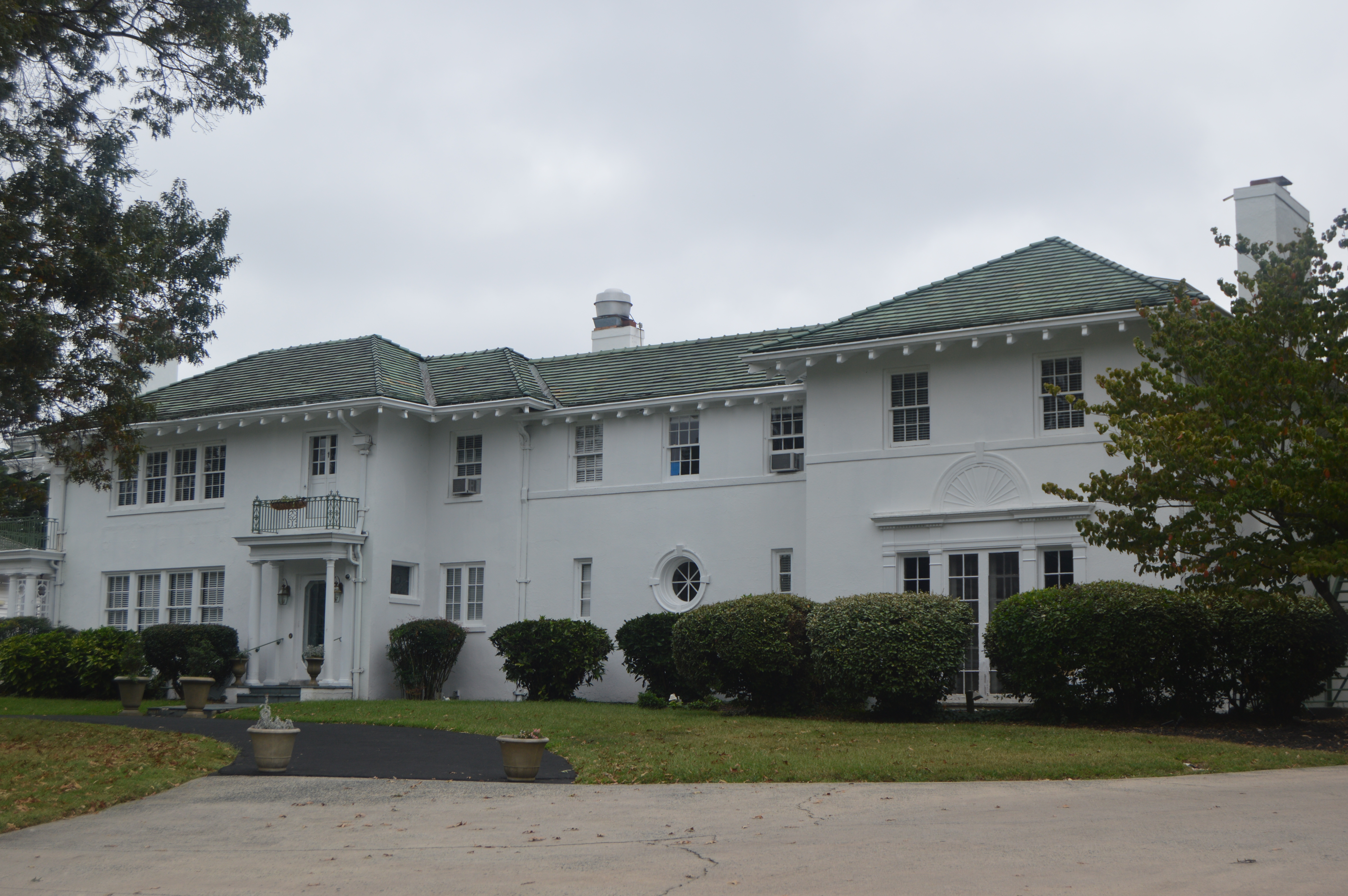
- Front of the T. Austin and Ernestine L. Finch House

- Location within North Carolina Location within the United States
- Location: 17 E. Main Street, Thomasville, North Carolina
- Coordinates: 35°52′58″N 80°04′48″W
- Area: 1.42 acres (0.57 ha)
- Built: c. 1921
- Architectural style: Renaissance Revival architecture
- NRHP reference No.: 100004321
- Added to NRHP: August 26, 2019

T. Austin and Ernestine L. Finch House is a historic house located in Thomasville, North Carolina. Built-in 1921, it is listed on the National Register of Historic Places.

== History ==
The 6,570-sq.ft house was erected as per Renaissance Revival architecture style in 1921 on a lot that Ernestine Lambeth Finch received as a wedding gift from her parents John Walter and Daisy Sumner Lambeth, who then resided in the home on the adjacent parcel to the east. It was later enlarged in 1938. The structure consists of "stuccoed walls, green Ludowici-Celadon tile hip roof, deep eaves supported by shaped rafter ends, wood casement and double-hung multipane windows and French doors".

As of 2021, the house is privately owned and its premises are offered as a destination wedding venue.
