= Reid Farm =

Historic farm in North Carolina, United States

- U.S. National Register of Historic Places
- Location within North Carolina Location within the United States
- Location: West of Jackson Hill on SR 2537, near Jackson Hill, North Carolina
- Coordinates: 35°34′10″N 80°11′58″W
- Area: 206.7 acres (83.6 ha)
- Architectural style: Greek Revival
- NRHP reference No.: 79001700
- Added to NRHP: January 25, 1979

Reid Farm is a historic home and farm located near Jackson Hill, Davidson County, North Carolina. The main house is a two-story, four-bay, vernacular Greek Revival style farmhouse. Also on the property are a massive threshing barn and a full complement of log and frame outbuildings dating from the mid-19th through the early-20th centuries. The buildings have been moved to Denton Farmpark.

It was added to the National Register of Historic Places in 1979.
