= Grace Episcopal Church (Lexington, North Carolina) =

Historic church in North Carolina, United States

- U.S. National Register of Historic Places
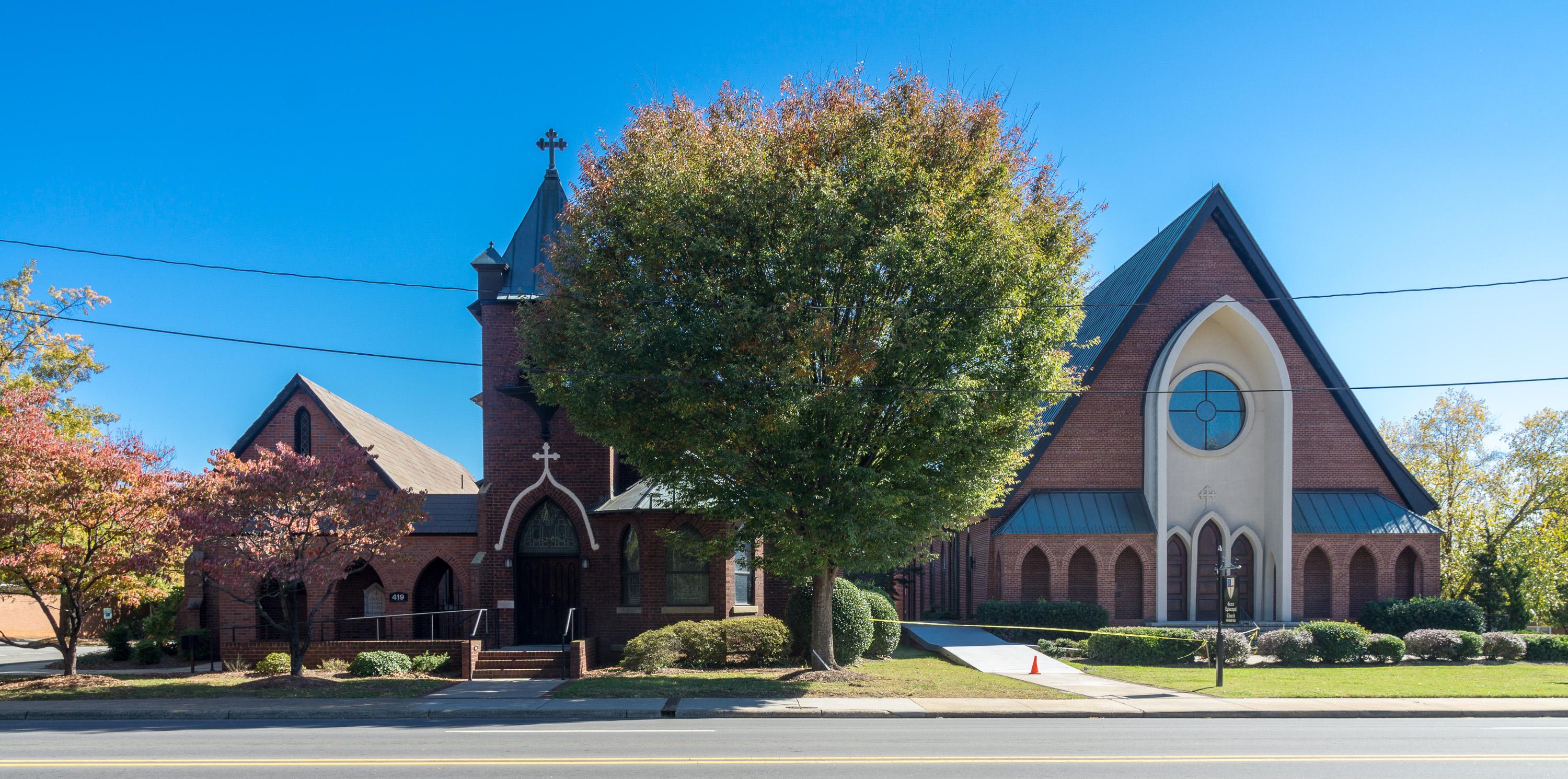

- Location within North Carolina Location within the United States
- Location: 419 S. Main St., Lexington, North Carolina
- Coordinates: 35°49′13″N 80°15′26″W
- Area: less than one acre
- Built: 1902
- Architect: Hook & Sawyer; et al.
- Architectural style: Late Gothic Revival
- NRHP reference No.: 06001138
- Added to NRHP: December 20, 2006

Grace Episcopal Church is a historic Episcopal church located at 419 S. Main Street in Lexington, Davidson County, North Carolina. The church reported 278 members in 2021 and 216 members in 2023; no membership statistics were reported in 2024 parochial reports. Plate and pledge income reported for the congregation in 2024 was $348,401. Average Sunday attendance (ASA) in 2024 was 88 persons.

The church was built in 1902, and is a one-story, Late Gothic Revival-style red brick building. It features a steeply pitched gable roof, lancet-arched doors and windows, buttresses, a front corner bell tower, and a three-part stained-glass window produced by Tiffany Studios in 1918. It was added to the National Register of Historic Places in 2006.
