= Grimes-Crotts Mill =

- U.S. National Register of Historic Places
- Location within North Carolina Location within the United States
- Location: SR 1445, near Reedy Creek, North Carolina
- Coordinates: 35°55′13″N 80°22′15″W
- Area: 13.2 acres (5.3 ha)
- Built: 1870-1880
- MPS: Davidson County MRA
- NRHP reference No.: 84002008
- Added to NRHP: July 10, 1984

Grimes-Crotts Mill, also known as Eureka Mills, Old Mill, Crotts Mill, is a historic grist mill located near Reedy Creek, Davidson County, North Carolina. It was built between 1870 and 1880, and is a 2 1/2-story, frame mill on a foundation of fieldstone and massive timber pilings. It is sheathed in plain weatherboard and has a monitor roof. The mill machinery was removed in 1937.

It was added to the National Register of Historic Places in 1984.
