= Old Davidson County Courthouse (North Carolina) =

- U.S. National Register of Historic Places
- U.S. Historic district – Contributing property
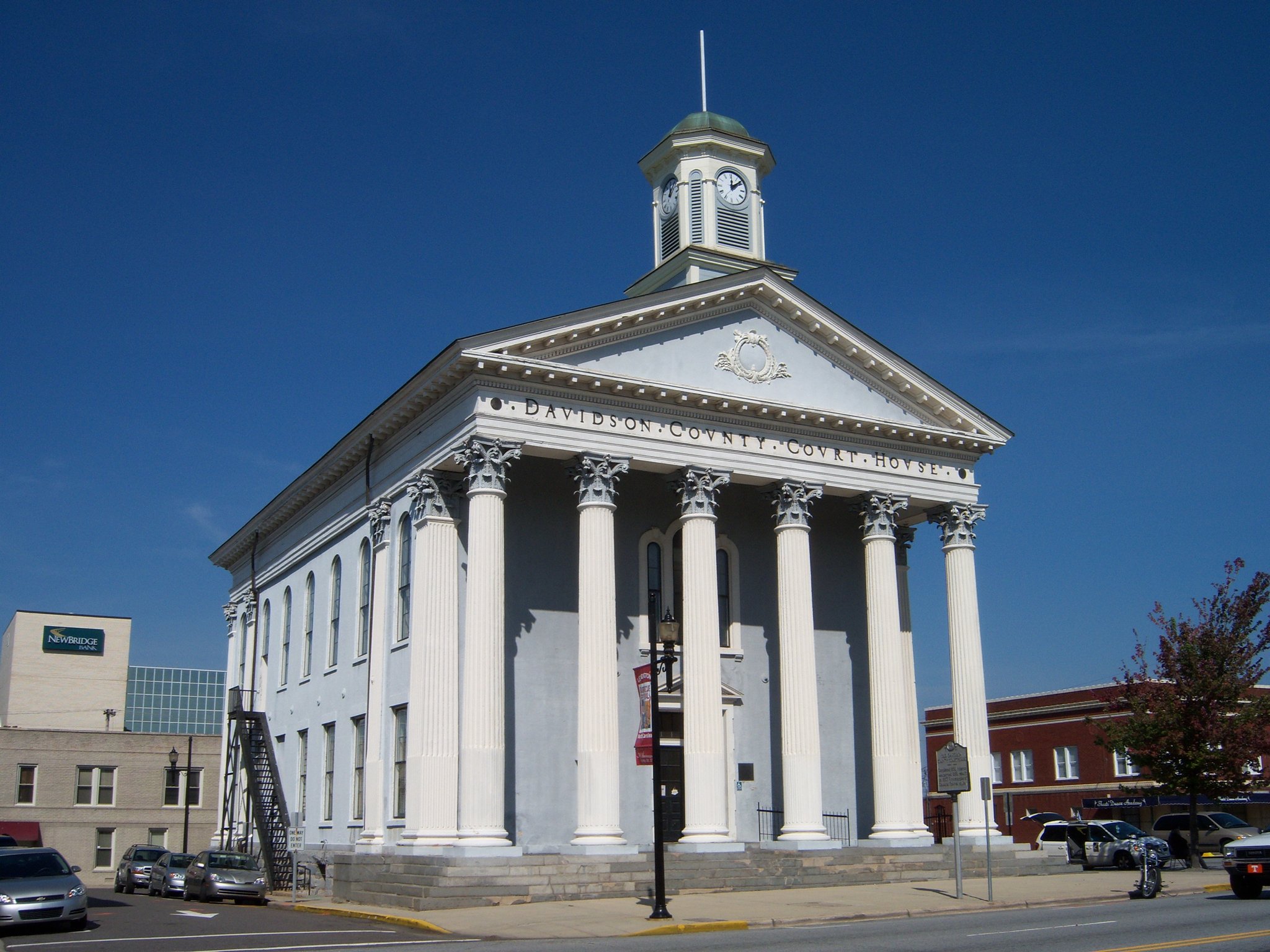
- Old Davidson County Courthouse, October 2008

- Location within North Carolina Location within the United States
- Location: Main and Center Sts., Lexington, North Carolina
- Coordinates: 35°49′30″N 80°15′13″W
- Area: 0.5 acres (0.20 ha)
- Built: 1858
- Architectural style: Classical Revival
- NRHP reference No.: 71000576
- Added to NRHP: June 24, 1971

The Old Davidson County Courthouse is a historic courthouse building located at Lexington, Davidson County, North Carolina. It was built in 1858, and is a two-story, gable front stuccoed stone temple-form building. It features a prostyle hexastyle portico, with fluted Roman Corinthian order columns. Above the portico is an octagonal clock tower. It was remodeled in 1918. Most county offices moved to a new courthouse built in 1959.

The building houses the Davidson County Historical Museum and was rededicated in 2014.

It was added to the National Register of Historic Places in 1971. It is located in the Uptown Lexington Historic District.
