= Emanuel United Church of Christ =

Emanuel United Church of Christ may refer to:

- Emanuel United Church of Christ (Manchester, Michigan), listed as a Michigan State Historic Site
- Church whose Emanuel United Church of Christ Cemetery, in Thomasville, North Carolina, is listed on the National Register of Historic Places (NRHP)
- Emanuel United Church of Christ (Lincolnton, North Carolina), NRHP-listed
