= Church Street School =

Church Street School may refer to:

- Church Street School (Thomasville, North Carolina), listed on the NRHP in North Carolina
- Church Street School (Nutley, New Jersey), listed on the NRHP in New Jersey
- Church Street School swimming pool in Glasgow, Scotland
- Church Street School (Tupelo, Mississippi), a historic building designed by N. W. Overstreet and listed on the National Register of Historic Places
