= Ledford High School =

American public school in North Carolina

Location
- 140 Jesse Green Rd; Thomasville, North Carolina 27360; United States
- Coordinates: 35°57′47″N 80°08′04″W

Information
- Type: Public
- Established: 1957 (69 years ago)
- School district: Davidson County Schools
- CEEB code: 343962
- Principal: Matt Coloton
- Teaching staff: 47.66 (FTE)
- Grades: 9–12
- Enrollment: 824 (2023-2024)
- Student to teacher ratio: 17.29
- Campus: Rural
- Colors: Black, White, Silver
- Athletics conference: 4A; PAC Seven 4A/5A
- Mascot: Panthers
- Website: lhs.davidson.k12.nc.us

Ledford High School is a public high school in Thomasville, North Carolina. It is part of the Davidson County Schools system and serves parts of Thomasville, Wallburg, High Point, Winston-Salem, and Kernersville areas.

== Administration ==
- Principal: Matt Coloton
- Assistant principals: Natasha Bumgarner, Sidney Cecil

== Feeder schools ==
- Friendship Elementary
- Hasty Elementary
- Wallburg Elementary
- Ledford Middle

== Athletics ==
Ledford is a member of the North Carolina High School Athletic Association (NCHSAA) and are classified as a 4A school. It is a part of the PAC Seven 4A/5A Conference. Ledford's main rivals are North Davidson and Oak Grove.

Sports Ledford offers:

- Baseball
- Basketball
- Cross country
- Football
- Golf
- Soccer
- Softball
- Swimming
- Tennis
- Track and field
- Volleyball
- Wrestling

=== State Championships ===
Ledford has won the following NCHSAA team state championships:

- 1981 1A/2A Women's Volleyball
- 1981 1A/2A Women's Slow-Pitch Softball
- 1984 Women's Volleyball
- 1991 2A Women's Slow-Pitch Softball
- 1992 2A Men's Golf
- 1995 2A Women's Basketball
- 1995 2A Women's Slow-Pitch Softball
- 1996 2A Women's Slow-Pitch Softball
- 1997 2A Women's Basketball
- 2000 2A Women's Basketball
- 2002 2A Women's Basketball
- 2005 2A Men's Golf
- 2006 2A Men's Golf
- 2007 2A Men's Golf
- 2011 3A Women's Golf
- 2012 3A Women's Golf
- 2013 3A Women's Golf

Conference Cup Championships

- 1990–91 2A Central Carolina Conference
- 1991–92 2A Central Carolina Conference
- 1993–94 2A Central Carolina Conference
- 1994–95 2A Central Carolina Conference
- 1995–96 2A Central Carolina Conference
- 1996–97 2A Central Carolina Conference
- 1998–99 2A Central Carolina Conference
- 1999–00 2A Central Carolina Conference
- 2002–03 2A Central Carolina Conference
- 2006–07 2A Central Carolina Conference
- 2011–12 3A Mid Piedmont Conference
- 2012–13 3A Mid Piedmont Conference
- 2013–14 3A Mid Piedmont Conference
- 2014–15 3A Mid Piedmont Conference
- 2015–16 3A Mid Piedmont Conference
- 2016–17 3A Mid Piedmont Conference
- 2017–18 2A Central Carolina Conference
- 2018–19 2A Central Carolina Conference

Cheerleading State Championships

- 1996 2A State Champs
- 2002 2A State Champs
- 2003 2A State Champs
- 2004 2A State Champs
- 2005 2A State Champs
- 2006 2A State Champs
- 2007 2A State Champs
- 2008 2A State Champs
- 2010 3A State Champs

Wachovia Cup

- 1985 2A Wachovia Cup Winners (Best overall sports programs in 2A)
- 1991 2A Wachovia Cup Winners (Best Overall sports programs in 2A)

== Music ==
Ledford Senior High School offers a variety of music programs to its students, such as chorus, concert band, marching band, an indoor percussion ensemble and an honors band. The Ledford Senior High School marching band, also known as The Panther Regiment, has had many successful marching seasons.

== Notable alumni ==
- Madison Hedgecock – NFL fullback and Super Bowl XLII Champion with the New York Giants
- Erin Hendricks – Miss North Carolina Teen USA 2003
- Brad Hoover – NFL fullback for the Carolina Panthers
- Jessica Jacobs – Miss North Carolina USA 2007
- Harrison Rhodes — NASCAR driver
- Steve Videtich – professional arena league football kicker for the Utah Blaze
- Jill Wagner – actress and television show host; former co-host of Wipeout
