= Welcome, North Carolina =

- Census-designated place (CDP)
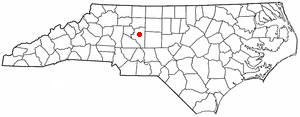
- Location of Welcome, North Carolina
- Coordinates: 35°54′24″N 80°15′17″W
- Country: United States
- State: North Carolina
- County: Davidson

Area
  - Total: 9.31 sq mi (24.12 km^{2})
  - Land: 9.31 sq mi (24.12 km^{2})
  - Water: 0 sq mi (0.00 km^{2})
- Elevation: 860 ft (260 m)

Population (2020)
  - Total: 4,131
  - Density: 443.6/sq mi (171.27/km^{2})
- Time zone: UTC-5 (Eastern (EST))
  - Summer (DST): UTC-4 (EDT)
- ZIP code: 27374
- Area code: 336
- FIPS code: 37-71760
- GNIS feature ID: 2402995

Welcome is a census-designated place (CDP) in Davidson County, North Carolina, United States. As of the 2020 census, Welcome had a population of 4,131. It is nationally known as the home of Richard Childress Racing. In addition, Walker and Associates, Inc., a nationwide communication value-add distribution is headquartered here. The town motto is "Welcome to Welcome, A Friendly Place," as posted on the welcoming sign. Neighboring communities and municipalities include Midway, Arcadia, and Lexington.

== History ==
In the early 1900s, a meeting was held in the community of Hinkle to decide what the new Winston-Salem Southbound Railway depot would be called. Records show that while there was disagreement, one man said the most important thing was for all people to be welcome. When the name Welcome was suggested, everyone agreed.

Beulah Church of Christ Cemetery, Good Hope Methodist Church Cemetery, and Waggoner Graveyard are listed on the National Register of Historic Places.

== Geography ==
According to the United States Census Bureau, the CDP has a total area of 9.4 square miles (24 km^{2}), all land.

== Demographics ==
Historical population
Census	Pop.	Note	%±
2020	4,131		—
U.S. Decennial Census

=== 2020 census ===
Welcome racial composition
Race	Number	Percentage
White (non-Hispanic)	3,540	84.69%
Black or African American (non-Hispanic)	145	3.51%
Native American	12	0.29%
Asian	64	1.55%
Pacific Islander	1	0.02%
Other/Mixed	211	5.11%
Hispanic or Latino	158	3.82%

As of the 2020 census, Welcome had a population of 4,131. The median age was 44.6 years. 20.5% of residents were under the age of 18 and 20.4% of residents were 65 years of age or older. For every 100 females there were 92.5 males, and for every 100 females age 18 and over there were 92.6 males age 18 and over.

85.3% of residents lived in urban areas, while 14.7% lived in rural areas.

There were 1,681 households, including 1,095 families, in Welcome. Of all households, 27.7% had children under the age of 18 living in them, 49.1% were married-couple households, 18.4% were households with a male householder and no spouse or partner present, and 24.7% were households with a female householder and no spouse or partner present. About 29.6% of all households were made up of individuals and 15.5% had someone living alone who was 65 years of age or older.

There were 1,810 housing units, of which 7.1% were vacant. The homeowner vacancy rate was 1.5% and the rental vacancy rate was 4.2%.

=== 2000 census ===
As of the census of 2000, there were 3,538 people, 1,437 households, and 1,092 families living in the CDP. The population density was 378.4 inhabitants per square mile (146.1/km^{2}). There were 1,514 housing units at an average density of 161.9 per square mile (62.5/km^{2}). The racial makeup of the CDP was 95.31% White, 2.66% African American, 0.08% Native American, 0.79% Asian, 0.37% from other races, and 0.79% from two or more races. Hispanic or Latino of any race were 0.65% of the population.

There were 1,437 households, out of which 31.3% had children under the age of 18 living with them, 64.2% were married couples living together, 8.1% had a female householder with no husband present, and 24.0% were non-families. 20.7% of all households were made up of individuals, and 7.8% had someone living alone who was 65 years of age or older. The average household size was 2.46 and the average family size was 2.84.

In the CDP, the population was spread out, with 22.6% under the age of 18, 7.3% from 18 to 24, 31.6% from 25 to 44, 24.9% from 45 to 64, and 13.6% who were 65 years of age or older. The median age was 38 years. For every 100 females, there were 97.7 males. For every 100 females age 18 and over, there were 95.5 males.

The median income for a household in the CDP was $42,266, and the median income for a family was $51,810. Males had a median income of $32,183 versus $26,495 for females. The per capita income for the CDP was $22,613. About 3.8% of families and 5.0% of the population were below the poverty line, including 7.5% of those under age 18 and 8.3% of those age 65 or over.

== Education ==
Welcome is home to North Davidson High School as well as North Davidson Middle School and Welcome Elementary School.

== Media ==
Welcome is home to WUNW-FM, a radio station broadcasting at 91.1 FM. It serves as a low-power repeater for WUNC, a public radio station broadcasting National Public Radio content.

== Notable people ==
- Bonita Brown, interim president of Fuquay Varina Middle School
- Austin Dillon, NASCAR driver
- Ty Dillon, NASCAR driver
- Austin Beck, professional baseball player, 6th overall pick in the 2017 Major League Baseball draft
- Shy Tuttle, professional football player for the Carolina Panthers
