= Wallburg, North Carolina =

- Town
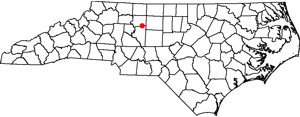
- Location of Wallburg, North Carolina
- Coordinates: 35°59′23″N 80°07′42″W
- Country: United States
- State: North Carolina
- Counties: Davidson

Government
  - Mayor: Christopher Osborne

Area
  - Total: 5.59 sq mi (14.48 km^{2})
  - Land: 5.59 sq mi (14.48 km^{2})
  - Water: 0 sq mi (0.00 km^{2})
- Elevation: 873 ft (266 m)

Population (2020)
  - Total: 3,051
  - Density: 545.7/sq mi (210.71/km^{2})
- Time zone: UTC-5 (Eastern (EST))
  - Summer (DST): UTC-4 (EDT)
- ZIP codes: 27373, 27107, 27265, 27284
- Area code: 336
- FIPS code: 37-70740
- GNIS feature ID: 2406823
- Website: www.townofwallburg.com

Wallburg is a town in Davidson County, North Carolina, United States. It was incorporated in 2004. As of the 2020 census it had a population of 3,051.

== Geography ==
Wallburg is located in northeastern Davidson County and is bordered to the north by Forsyth County. The town is largely along North Carolina Highway 109, about 10 miles (16 km) southeast of Winston-Salem and the same distance northwest of High Point, between the intersections with Gumtree Road and Shady Grove Church Road. Other nearby municipalities include Kernersville to the northeast, Thomasville to the south, and Midway to the southwest. Wallburg is located in the Wallburg Elementary, Oak Grove Middle School, and Ledford Senior High school districts. In 2017, the Wallburg high school district will be changed to the Oak Grove High School district, which will be located across the street from Oak Grove Middle School.

According to the United States Census Bureau, the town has a total area of 5.6 square miles (14.4 km^{2}), all land.

== History ==
The George W. Wall House was added to the National Register of Historic Places in 1984.

=== Climate ===
Climate data for Wallburg, North Carolina
Month	Jan	Feb	Mar	Apr	May	Jun	Jul	Aug	Sep	Oct	Nov	Dec	Year
Record high °F (°C)	93 (34)	85 (29)	88 (31)	94 (34)	97 (36)	104 (40)	106 (41)	104 (40)	98 (37)	94 (34)	89 (32)	80 (27)	106 (41)
Mean daily maximum °F (°C)	51 (11)	56 (13)	64 (18)	74 (23)	80 (27)	87 (31)	90 (32)	88 (31)	82 (28)	73 (23)	63 (17)	53 (12)	72 (22)
Daily mean °F (°C)	41 (5)	45 (7)	52 (11)	61 (16)	68 (20)	76 (24)	79 (26)	78 (26)	72 (22)	61 (16)	52 (11)	43 (6)	61 (16)
Mean daily minimum °F (°C)	30 (−1)	33 (1)	39 (4)	48 (9)	56 (13)	65 (18)	68 (20)	68 (20)	61 (16)	49 (9)	41 (5)	33 (1)	49 (10)
Record low °F (°C)	−7 (−22)	1 (−17)	7 (−14)	22 (−6)	33 (1)	39 (4)	47 (8)	41 (5)	35 (2)	19 (−7)	10 (−12)	0 (−18)	−7 (−22)
Average precipitation inches (mm)	3.69 (94)	3.80 (97)	4.12 (105)	3.90 (99)	3.47 (88)	4.04 (103)	4.52 (115)	4.43 (113)	4.07 (103)	3.36 (85)	3.41 (87)	3.43 (87)	46.24 (1,176)
Source: The Weather Channel

== Demographics ==
Historical population
Census	Pop.	Note	%±
2010	3,047		—
2020	3,051		0.1%
U.S. Decennial Census

=== 2020 census ===
As of the 2020 census, Wallburg had a population of 3,051. The median age was 45.4 years. 20.9% of residents were under the age of 18 and 18.7% of residents were 65 years of age or older. For every 100 females there were 97.1 males, and for every 100 females age 18 and over there were 95.4 males age 18 and over. There were 935 families residing in the town.

37.4% of residents lived in urban areas, while 62.6% lived in rural areas.

There were 1,181 households in Wallburg, of which 32.3% had children under the age of 18 living in them. Of all households, 63.3% were married-couple households, 13.7% were households with a male householder and no spouse or partner present, and 18.0% were households with a female householder and no spouse or partner present. About 18.8% of all households were made up of individuals and 9.5% had someone living alone who was 65 years of age or older.

There were 1,245 housing units, of which 5.1% were vacant. The homeowner vacancy rate was 1.3% and the rental vacancy rate was 9.7%.

Wallburg racial composition
Race	Number	Percentage
White (non-Hispanic)	2,764	90.59%
Black or African American (non-Hispanic)	48	1.57%
Native American	8	0.26%
Asian	13	0.43%
Other/Mixed	98	3.21%
Hispanic or Latino	120	3.93%
