= Hedgecock =

Hedgecock is a surname. Notable people with the surname include:

- Madison Hedgecock (born 1981), American football player
- Roger Hedgecock (born 1946), American politician and talk radio host
