= Austin Beck =

American baseball player (born 1998)

- Outfielder
- Born: November 21, 1998 (age 27); Lexington, North Carolina, U.S.
- Bats: Right Throws: Right
- Stats at Baseball Reference

Austin Steven Beck (born November 21, 1998) is an American former professional baseball outfielder. Despite being drafted with the sixth overall selection in the 2017 MLB draft by the Oakland Athletics, he never played in Major League Baseball (MLB).

== Amateur career ==
Beck attended North Davidson High School in Welcome, North Carolina. As a junior he hit .465 with five home runs and 30 runs batted in (RBIs). In pre-game warm-ups prior to his team's first playoff game that year, he tore his ACL causing him to miss the remainder of the playoffs. Beck returned from the injury to start his senior year. Beck committed to the University of North Carolina at Chapel Hill to play college baseball.

== Professional career ==
=== Oakland Athletics ===
Beck was considered one of the top prospects for the 2017 Major League Baseball draft. The Oakland Athletics selected him with the sixth overall selection of the draft. The club signed him to a franchise-record $5.303 million contract. After signing, Beck was assigned to the rookie–level Arizona League Athletics, where he spent the whole season, posting a .211 batting average with two home runs and 28 RBI in 41 games.

Beck spent the 2018 season with the Beloit Snappers of the Single–A Midwest League, slashing .296/.335/.383 with two home runs and 60 RBI in 123 games and earning All-Star honors. He spent 2019 with the Stockton Ports of the Class A-Advanced California League. Over 85 games, he batted .251/.302/.411 with eight home runs and 49 RBI. Beck did not play in a game in 2020 due to the cancellation of the minor league season because of the COVID-19 pandemic.

Beck returned to action in 2021, splitting the year between the High–A Lansing Lugnuts and Triple–A Las Vegas Aviators. In 77 combined games, he slashed .198/.251/.369 with 10 home runs and 39 RBI. In 2022, Beck spent time with the rookie–level Arizona Complex League Athletics, Lansing, and the Double–A Midland RockHounds. In 68 games between the three affiliates, he accumulated a .250/.304/.388 with 9 home runs and 30 RBI.

In 2023, Beck suffered a torn ACL in spring training and was ruled out for the entirety of the season. He elected free agency following the season on November 6, 2023.

=== Los Angeles Dodgers ===
On December 16, 2023, Beck signed a minor league contract with the Los Angeles Dodgers. He played in 65 games for the Double–A Tulsa Drillers, batting .214 with 13 home runs and 45 RBI. Beck announced his retirement from professional baseball on August 6, 2024.
