= Randolph Street Historic District =

Historic district in North Carolina, United States

- U.S. National Register of Historic Places
- U.S. Historic district
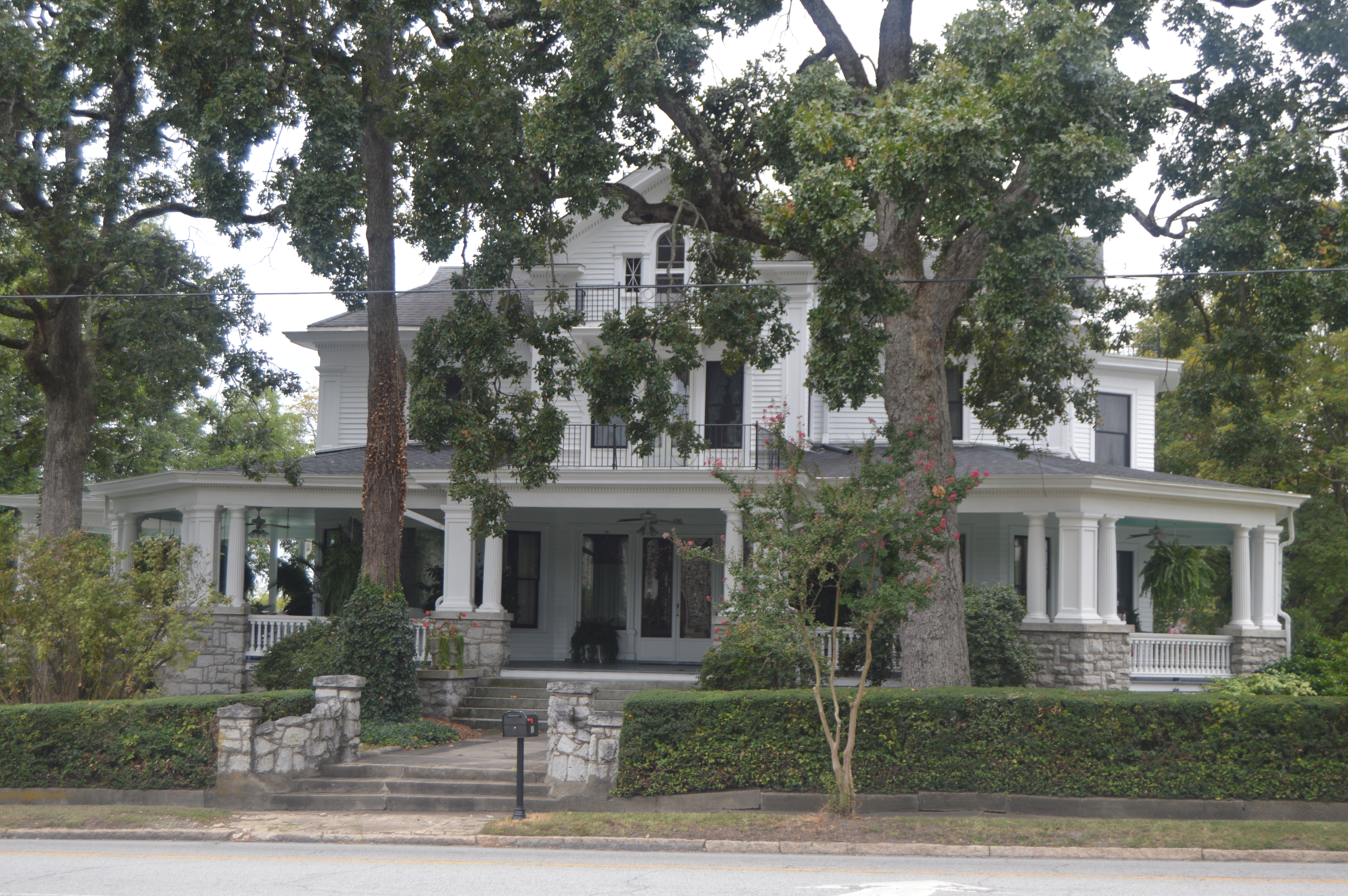
- House across from Memorial Methodist

- Location within North Carolina Location within the United States
- Location: 100-200 blocks of Randolph St., & 10 W. Colonial Dr., Thomasville, North Carolina
- Coordinates: 35°52′48″N 80°04′51″W
- Area: 14 acres (5.7 ha)
- Built: c. 1900
- Architect: Marvin W. Helms
- Architectural style: Colonial Revival, Bungalow/Craftsman
- NRHP reference No.: 12000571
- Added to NRHP: August 28, 2012

Randolph Street Historic District is a national historic district located at Thomasville, Davidson County, North Carolina. The district encompasses 10 contributing buildings in mixed-use area in the city of Thomasville. The contributing buildings include three residences, the Memorial Methodist Church (1951), the Standard Chair Company Building (c. 1926), the Gray Concrete Pipe Company Machine Shop (c. 1923, c. 1935, c. 1957), and the Carolina and Yadkin Valley Railroad Depot (1913).

It was added to the National Register of Historic Places in 2012.
