= Bethany Reformed and Lutheran Church Cemetery =

Historic cemetery in Davidson County, North Carolina, US

- Bethany United Church of Christ, formerly Bethany Reformed and Lutheran Church Cemetery
- U.S. National Register of Historic Places
- Location within North Carolina Location within the United States
- Location: SR 1716, near Midway, North Carolina
- Area: 2 acres (0.81 ha)
- MPS: Anglo-German Cemeteries TR
- NRHP reference No.: 84001994
- Added to NRHP: July 10, 1984

Bethany United Church of Christ Cemetery is a historic church cemetery formerly known as Bethany Reformed and Lutheran Church near Midway, North Carolina, United States. It contains approximately 400 gravestones, with the earliest gravestone dated to 1781. It features a unique collection of folk gravestones by local stonecutters erected in Davidson County in the late-18th and first half of the 19th centuries.

It was listed on the National Register of Historic Places in 1984.
