= Brummell's Inn =

Historic house in North Carolina, United States

- U.S. National Register of Historic Places
- Location within North Carolina Location within the United States
- Location: North of Thomasville, near Thomasville, North Carolina
- Coordinates: 35°56′55″N 80°06′17″W
- Area: 30 acres (12 ha)
- Built: c. 1814
- Architectural style: Georgian, Federal, Vern. late Georg. early Fed.
- NRHP reference No.: 80002822
- Added to NRHP: November 25, 1980

Brummell's Inn is a historic inn and tavern near Thomasville, Davidson County, North Carolina. It was originally constructed as a small log house in the late 18th/early 19th century. It was expanded in about 1814 in a vernacular Late Georgian / Early Federal style, with later additions. The resultant building is two-stories and eight bays wide. Also on the property are a contributing smokehouse, barn, and cemetery. The stagecoach inn operated into the 1850s, after which it was used as a dwelling house.

It was added to the National Register of Historic Places in 1980.
