= Thomasville Public Library =

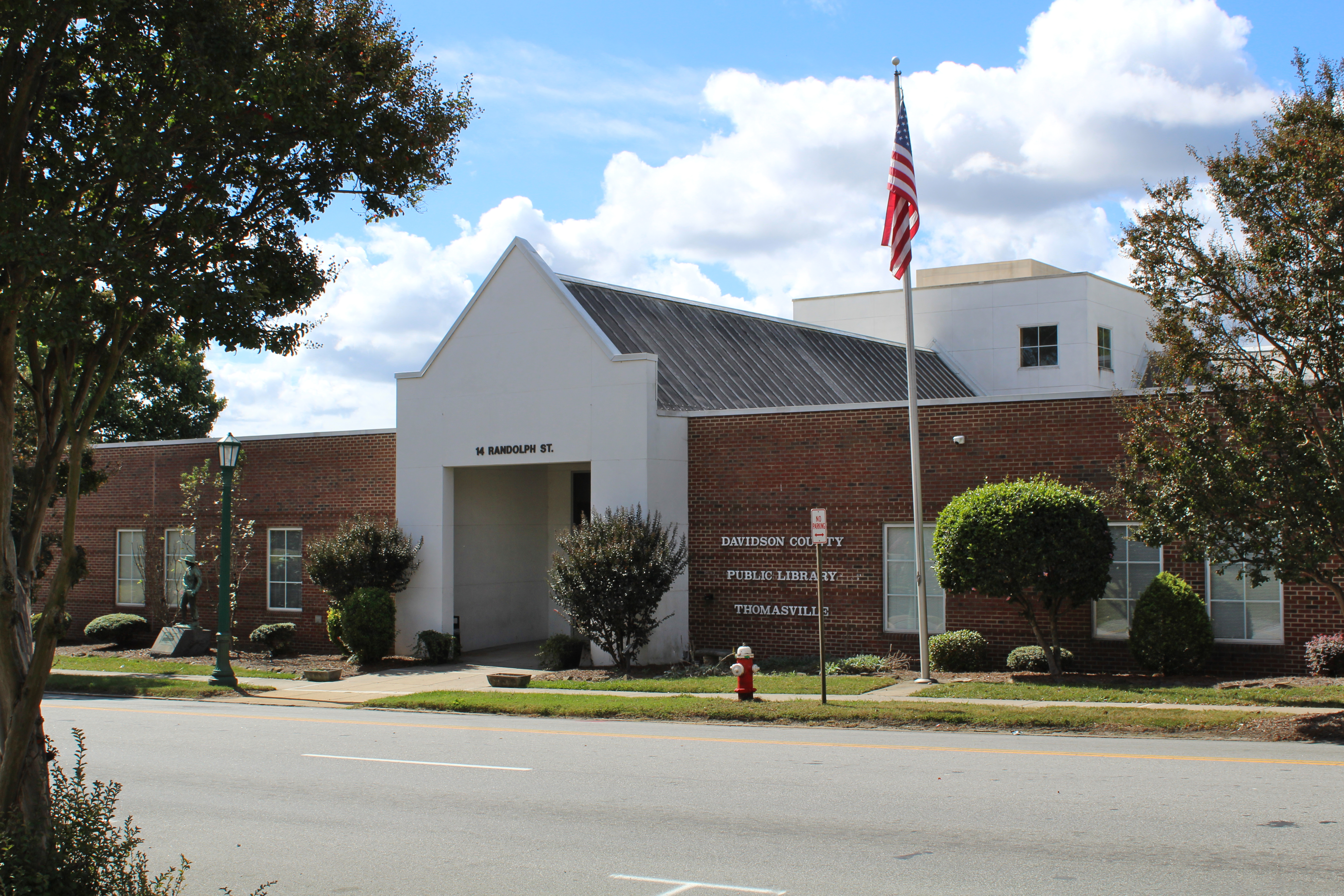
- 35.88138°N 80.08135°W
- Location: 14 Randolph Street, Thomasville, North Carolina 27360, United States, United States
- Established: October 25, 1928
- Architect: Michael Newman
- Branch of: Davidson County Public Library

Collection
- Size: 82,916 (2025)

Other information
- Library Manager: Keaton Toney
- Assistant Librarian: Jessica Marsh
- Parent organization: Davidson County Public Library
- Website: co.davidson.nc.libguides.com/thomasvillepubliclibrary

The Thomasville Public Library is located in Thomasville, North Carolina, United States. It is the second largest branch of the Davidson County Public Library system. The library was established in October 1928, located in one room of the Main Street Thomasville High School and housing 200 books. The library then moved around Thomasville's commercial district before receiving a dedicated building at 22 Randolph Street in 1958. In 1990, the library moved into its current 19,000 sq ft (1,800 m^{2}) building at 14 Randolph Street, which has a capacity of more than 70,000 books.

The Thomasville Public Library has long been home to a diverse collection of materials, which in addition to books includes physical media such as audiobooks, newspapers, magazines, and films, as well as online resources. The library holds a variety of programming, including craft, cooking, book club, and children's story hour programs. In 2023, the library received a Service Innovation Award from the North Carolina Public Library Directors Association for its family portraits program.

== History ==
=== Formation ===
In 1923, the Women's Club of Lexington expressed the desire to establish local libraries in Davidson County. In December 1924, they devoted $150 to establish a paid subscription library within a part of the March Hotel in Lexington. The club then shifted to a new goal to establish libraries in the county free to the public. In early 1928, they were successful in lobbying the Davidson County government to establish a library board chaired by John R. Myers to oversee the establishment of libraries in the county. The county established a combined fund of $5,000 for the Lexington and Thomasville library branches, while the government of Thomasville supplied $800 for its branch. On August 6, 1928, a committee was established to train and hire a librarian to manage libraries in both cities.

The first Thomasville Public Library opened on October 25, 1928. (Note: A few sources list the opening date as October 24, 1928, however most give October 25, 1928.) It was located in a room on the west side of the second floor of the Main Street Thomasville High School building. It housed 200 books and was managed by Millie J. Crowell.

=== Early years ===
Within months, the collection was moved to Commerce Street and Anne Mebane took the role as librarian. In March 1929, the Davidson County Public Library was offered grants by the Rosenwald Foundation, under several conditions, including that the local governments support the libraries with an amount of their own money, and that the county serve black citizens in addition to its white patrons. The latter requirement would be met via the establishment of segregated colored libraries in Lexington and Thomasville. Funding from the foundation would continue for two years, until the Great Depression caused the local governments to fail to meet their funding quotas. In summer 1932, the library nearly closed, but was kept alive through community assistance. Over a few years, the library outgrew the space given to it at the Main Street School. It moved to two different storefronts in the commercial district of Thomasville between 1928 and 1938, first on Commerce Street, until moving to Salem Street on June 19, 1934. During the early 1930s, Clara Johnson succeeded Mebane as librarian. At times throughout that decade the library limited checkouts to one book per person because the number of readers nearly equaled the number of books on hand, and during the mid-to-late 1930s, monthly circulation was around 500. On September 3, 1935, Eloise Ward replaced Johnson in the head librarian role.

Thomasville's segregated library for serving black patrons was throughout the 1930s first located in an empty room within a store at the intersection of Highland Street and Church Street. In 1938, its collections would be kept in the Church Street School upon the school's inception. In 1951 (Note: A Recent History of Thomasville, North Carolina by Wint Capel gives 1952 as the date of inception.) the Brown Street Library opened as a dedicated library for black citizens. Reynolda Motley was hired as its head librarian.

On April 23, 1938, the main library was moved to the Thomasville City Hall after that new building's completion. The head librarian post was then held by Elmira Hearne, Margaret Eller, Ada White, and Mary Green Matthews before Mary Lee Crouse entered the role in August 1952, after having served as assistant librarian since September 1938. As the library's collection and readership grew through the next twenty years from 6,574 books to over 15,000, the need for a dedicated library building became apparent.

=== Randolph Street and integration ===
From 1954, it was proposed that the library move into a new multi-purpose county building built in Thomasville, occupying a second floor. However, this proposal was opposed by library staff and members of the community. On May 1, 1956, it was announced that the library would receive a dedicated building secured through funding from local donors, with the majority coming from the Lambeth and Finch families of Thomasville. On April 20, 1958, the first dedicated county-owned library building opened in a ceremony with over 400 in attendance. The building had a size of 6,000 sq ft (560 m^{2}). and was located on Randolph Street at the intersection with Colonial Drive. Luther Lashmit served as architect for the structure. The first library structure owned by the county, it had shelf space for 20,000 books and a maximum capacity of 60 people.

In the early 1960s, the library rapidly grew in its scope and collections, and by July 1964, the collection was approaching it's 20,000 capacity with a total of 18,106 books. This growth had necessitated the addition of a wing to the library which opened April 14, 1964, financed partly by $20,000 from the estate of J. Walter Lambeth and dedicated to him. Around 1965, the library became accessible to black patrons, and on October 1, 1968, the segregated Brown Street library closed, with its 3,380 volumes of material integrating with the main library. Its longtime librarian Reynolda Motley joined the main library staff thereafter. Throughout her tenure from 1947 until retiring in 1975, Motley was the only black library staff member in Davidson County.

=== Current building and recent years ===
As early as 1978, library staff perceived the need for expansion once again. The greatest limitations to the building were its inaccessibility for handicapped patrons and lack of space for its growing children's collection and unique archive of magazines and newspapers. In 1987, a committee chaired by Sumner Finch was formed for the purpose of securing grants and selecting a new site for the library. The county dedicated $300,000 to a new library building, while private donors raised $900,000, $100,000 was secured through selling the old property, and the state government granted $125,000. The site chosen was two doors down from the previous library was donated by the government of Thomasville and was valued at $135,000 at the time. The land had housed a Thomasville Furniture Industries mechanical shop, and prior to that, the Thomasville Civic Center before its destruction by fire in 1976. Michael Newman of the firm Newman & Jones served as the architect for the new building. Construction began in 1989, and on August 20, 1990, the library officially moved to its current 19,000 sq ft (1,800 m^{2}) location at 14 Randolph Street, with at least 200 present for the opening ceremony. The new library building has a capacity of 70,000 books, a large increase from the previous building's intended capacity of 25,000, and at the time of moving, 43,000 books were relocated.

On October 1, 1994, Crouse retired as head librarian after 58 years of work. Ruth Ann Copley assumed the role thereafter. Copley left the position to become director of the Davidson County Public Library system on July 1, 2004, after which Sarah Hudson assumed the position of head librarian at Thomasville. In July 2010, the Davidson County Public Library became a founding library of the NC Cardinal consortium, which from February 2013 began to circulate materials to and from participating libraries throughout the state.

In 2025, the library's current manager, Keaton Toney, was nominated for the Association for Rural & Small Libraries (ARSL) awards for Distinguished Service, and Innovative Service. On April 15, 2026, cellist Yo-Yo Ma visited the library, discussing the establishment's impact on the community, its challenges, and performing.

== Services ==
=== Collection ===
As of 2025, the Thomasville Public Library contains over 82,000 items, including 75,000 books, 1,500 DVDs, 1,200 Blu-rays, and 4,300 audiobooks. The library houses a local history and genealogy room which features county and state records, family histories, and a large collection of Gerald W. Johnson history books presented to the establishment in 1980.

In addition to the staple of its book collections, the Thomasville Public Library has been acknowledged for keeping a variety of media types. From 1928, the library was subscribed to three local newspapers and twenty-eight magazines. In 1971, the library began to house microfilm of archived newspapers and magazines, and at that time had already been circulating music records ranging from rock albums to musical soundtracks. In April of that year, the library began to circulate framed art reproductions for free, and the collection of art for circulation at that time was 12 paintings. By 1978, cassettes, films, and art sculptures had been added to the collections available for checkout. Crouse was integral in the expansion of the types of media offered, as she felt that films and shows which referenced or adapted books encouraged watchers to inquire about those titles, rather than taking their place.

=== Programming ===
Thomasville Public Library has housed a variety of programming since its inception. Author visits have been a recurring program throughout the library's history, including a 1977 visit from children's author Ellis Credle, and the 2009 Author Fair featuring over 20 local writers. Children's story hour programs have been held since at least 1935. The library's summer reading program recurs yearly, was started during the librarianship of Mary Green Matthews, and thus dates back to at least 1952. Other longstanding programs include crafts and outreach to nursing homes and schools. In recent years, programming has diversified to include cooking programs, in addition to demonstrations from local guests such as beekeepers and martial arts groups. In 2023, the library received a Service Innovation Award from the North Carolina Public Library Directors Association for its family portraits program. The program allows patrons to participate in group photo shoots with props and backdrops, and receive edited files digitally. It began in 2021 and recurs yearly.
