= Norris McDonald =

American environmental activist

Norris McDonald

Norris McDonald is an American environmental activist. He is the founder and president of the African American Environmentalist Association and the Center for Environment, Commerce & Energy. He was listed by Ebony (magazine) in 2012 as one of America's top 100 most influential African Americans. died May 14, 2019

Norris McDonald, a leading black environmentalist, is the founder and president of the African American Environmental Association (AAEA), an organization dedicated to protecting the environment, enhancing human, animal and plant ecologies, and increasing African American participation in the environmental movement.

== Biography ==
Norris McDonald was born to parents Sandy Norris McDonald Sr. and Katie Louvina Best in 1958 in Thomasville, North Carolina. Norris McDonald Sr. was a high school principal and Katie Louvina Best worked for the local public school system. She died of breast cancer at the age of 26.

McDonald attended Wake Forest University where he earned his bachelor's degree in 1977. After college, McDonald moved to Washington, D.C. hoping to find a job as a Congressional staffer. Instead, he was hired as a staffer at the Environmental Policy Institute in 1979 (now called Friends of the Earth) where he worked for the next seven years. McDonald's primary duties included media relations, public education, researching, lobbying, and fundraising. During this time, McDonald was introduced to environmental issues across the nation. He also noticed that there were no black professionals working for environmental groups in the Washington, D.C. area. The absence of black professionals in those organizations inspired him to create the AAEA in 1985.

McDonald led the new organization in what would soon be known as urban environmentalism. The organization promoted recycling, cleaning storm drains, weatherizing, and climate-auditing homes in working-class neighborhoods in Washington, D.C. The Association's activities usually created the first interest in environmental concerns in the capital's inner city neighborhoods.

The Association also started a minority environmental internship program in 1989 which placed black college students as interns at several national environmental groups. Many of the first interns from AAEA moved on to work permanently with national environmental organizations and in federal agencies such as the United States Environmental Protection Agency (EPA). Some have become environmental lawyers..".

Norris describes himself as a "black conservative environmentalist". He believes the close ties of the black and environmental movements to the Democratic party are inefficient, arguing that "This leaves the communities out in the cold whenever the Republican Party wins.".

The AAEA has also sponsored creek walks, tours of inner city toxic waste sites, power plants, drinking-water plants, sewage treatment plants, and conservation farms, all with the idea of bringing together mostly white environmentalists with black inner city residents. The AAEA has also lobbied Congress and various state and local agencies to promote protection of the environment. McDonald himself has traveled to countries all over the world, including China and France, to tour nuclear power plants and examine alternate models for keeping the air clean and reducing global warming.

Because of his work in environmentalism, Norris McDonald has received various awards including the Environment Magazine Award in 1991, the Conservation award from the National Wildlife Federation in 1997, and the Green Room Energy and Environmental Leadership Award in 2012. In December 2012 he was named one of Ebony magazine's Power 100, meaning one of the most influential African Americans in the nation.

McDonald was married to Kim-Lee Hawkins in 1991. They divorced in 1994. They had one child together, Sandy Norris McDonald III, whom McDonald raised as a single parent.
