= Hampton House (Arcadia, North Carolina) =

Historic house in North Carolina, United States

- U.S. National Register of Historic Places
- Location within North Carolina Location within the United States
- Location: SR 483, near Arcadia, North Carolina
- Coordinates: 35°56′47″N 80°22′17″W
- Area: 54.3 acres (22.0 ha)
- Built: 1879
- Architectural style: Greek Revival
- MPS: Davidson County MRA
- NRHP reference No.: 84002025
- Added to NRHP: July 10, 1984

Hampton House is a historic home located near Arcadia, Davidson County, North Carolina. It was built about 1879, and is a two-story, three-bay, frame I-house of simple Greek Revival style. The 1 1/2-story rear wing is of log construction and dates to the early-19th century. It was attached to the main block at the time of its construction in 1879. Also on the property is a contributing pegged frame granary.

It was added to the National Register of Historic Places in 1984.
