= Shadrach Lambeth House =

Historic house in North Carolina, United States

- U.S. National Register of Historic Places
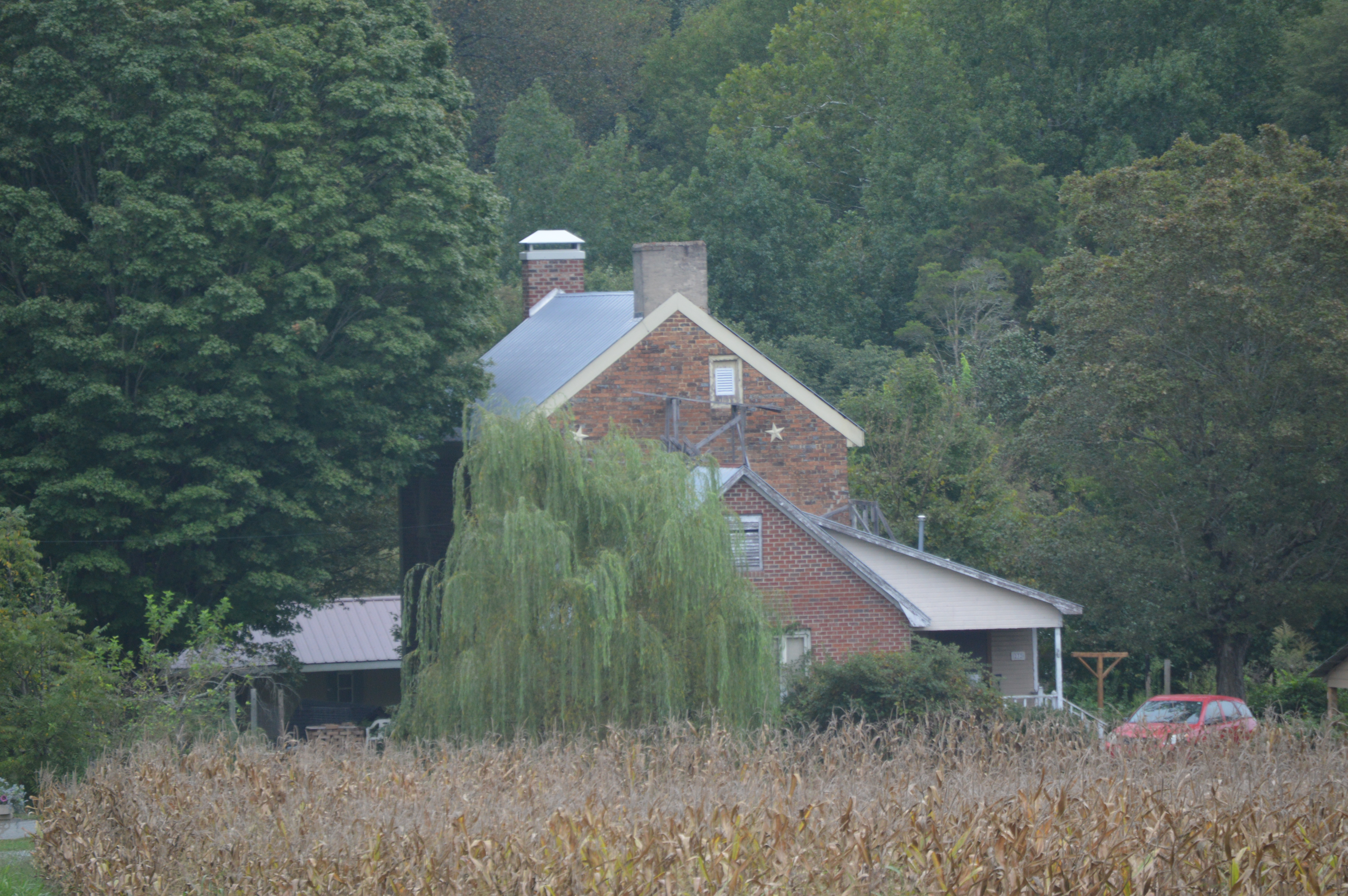
- Western end

- Location within North Carolina Location within the United States
- Location: SR 2062, near Thomasville, North Carolina
- Coordinates: 35°51′24″N 80°3′19″W
- Area: 8.6 acres (3.5 ha)
- Built: c. 1837
- Architectural style: Federal
- MPS: Davidson County MRA
- NRHP reference No.: 84002135
- Added to NRHP: July 10, 1984

Shadrach Lambeth House, also known as Pennington Place and Shoaf House, is a historic home located near Thomasville, Davidson County, North Carolina. It was built about 1837, and is a two-story, three bay by two bay, Federal-style brick dwelling. It has a one-story brick kitchen addition added in the late-19th century.

It was added to the National Register of Historic Places in 1984.
