= Waggoner Graveyard =

Historic cemetery in North Carolina, United States

- U.S. National Register of Historic Places
- Location within North Carolina Location within the United States
- Location: SR 1814, near Welcome, North Carolina
- Coordinates: 35°55′21″N 80°11′46″W
- Area: less than one acre
- MPS: Anglo-German Cemeteries TR
- NRHP reference No.: 84002158
- Added to NRHP: July 10, 1984

Waggoner Graveyard is a historic family cemetery located near Welcome, Davidson County, North Carolina. It contains approximately 15 gravestones, with the earliest dated to 1820. Burials continued into the early-20th century. It features a unique collection of folk gravestones by local stonecutters erected in Davidson County in the late-18th and first half of the 19th centuries.

It was listed on the National Register of Historic Places in 1984.
