= Midway, North Carolina =

- Town
- Seal
- Etymology: Its position between Winston-Salem and Lexington
- Nickname: "Gateway to Davidson County"
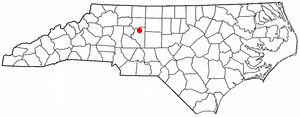
- Location of Midway within North Carolina
- Coordinates: 35°58′30″N 80°13′14″W
- Country: United States
- State: North Carolina
- Counties: Davidson
- Incorporated: June 29, 2006

Government
  - Mayor: John Byrum

Area
  - Total: 7.80 sq mi (20.20 km^{2})
  - Land: 7.80 sq mi (20.20 km^{2})
  - Water: 0 sq mi (0.00 km^{2})
- Elevation: 896 ft (273 m)

Population (2020)
  - Total: 4,742
  - Density: 607.9/sq mi (234.71/km^{2})
- Time zone: UTC-5 (EST)
  - Summer (DST): UTC-4 (EDT)
- ZIP codes: 27107, 27127, 27295
- Area code: 336
- GNIS feature ID: 2424935
- Website: midway-nc.gov

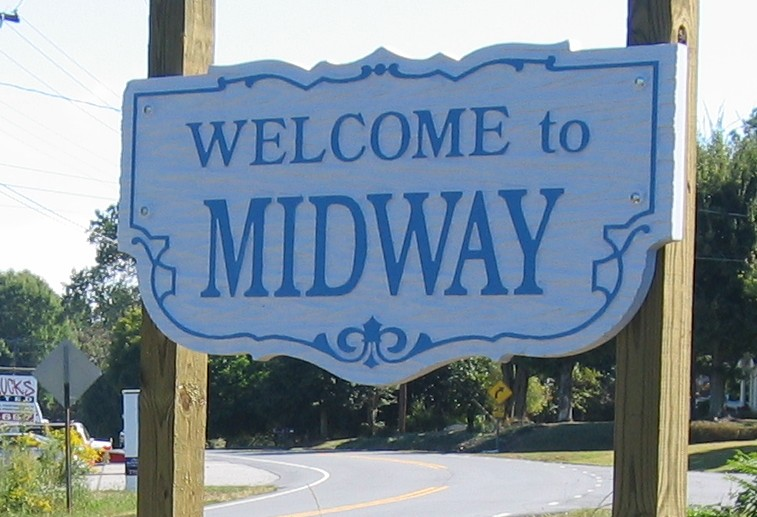
Midway welcoming sign during construction on Old U.S. Hwy 52

Midway is a town in Davidson County, North Carolina, United States. It is located within the township of the same name. As of the 2020 census, Midway had a population of 4,742. Midway is situated approximately 275 metres (902 ft) above sea level. Midway is part of the Piedmont Triad region and is neighbored by the communities of Arcadia (west), Welcome (south), Wallburg (northeast) and Winston-Salem (north). Every autumn, the town hosts the Midway Christmas Parade in celebration of the coming Christmas season.

== History ==
Bethany Reformed and Lutheran Church Cemetery and the Hamilton Everhart Farm are listed on the National Register of Historic Places.

== Demographics ==
Historical population
Census	Pop.	Note	%±
2010	4,679		—
2020	4,742		1.3%
U.S. Decennial Census

=== 2020 census ===
Midway racial composition
Race	Number	Percentage
White (non-Hispanic)	3,906	82.37%
Black or African American (non-Hispanic)	347	7.32%
Native American	7	0.15%
Asian	30	0.63%
Pacific Islander	1	0.02%
Other/Mixed	161	3.4%
Hispanic or Latino	290	6.12%

As of the 2020 census, there were 4,742 people, 1,945 households, and 1,386 families residing in the town. The median age was 46.1 years. 20.1% of residents were under the age of 18 and 21.6% were 65 years of age or older. For every 100 females, there were 97.9 males, and for every 100 females age 18 and over, there were 94.4 males age 18 and over.

96.0% of residents lived in urban areas, while 4.0% lived in rural areas.

Of occupied households, 29.4% had children under the age of 18 living in them. 53.3% were married-couple households, 16.6% were households with a male householder and no spouse or partner present, and 25.3% were households with a female householder and no spouse or partner present. About 23.8% of all households were made up of individuals, and 12.6% had someone living alone who was 65 years of age or older.

There were 2,022 housing units, of which 3.8% were vacant. The homeowner vacancy rate was 0.4%, and the rental vacancy rate was 6.5%.

== Etymology ==
The town of Midway derives its name from its relative geographic location, "midway" between the cities of Winston-Salem and Lexington. Urban sprawl and annexation by the city of Winston-Salem has muddled the logical apparency of the town's name since the city limits of Winston-Salem now share a border with Midway while Lexington's nearest border is 7 miles (11 km) away. Originally, the community which now forms the center of modern Midway was founded as "Eller" when the Eller train depot was constructed, labeled as such after members of the Eller family which resided nearby. Until incorporation in 2006, many maps still marked the area as "Eller", despite disuse of the name over time by the public, local media, and local establishments.

== Post office ==
The town of Midway does not currently have a post office, or a ZIP code to its name. Rather than being within the town limits, the post office with the "Midway, North Carolina", designation is found in a small community of the same name in Rockingham County, 5 miles (8 km) southwest of Reidsville. As a result, most residents of the town either use Winston-Salem or Lexington city names for mailing via the United States Postal Service.

== Incorporation ==
The community sought incorporation from 2004–2006 to protect local identity and to prevent annexation by nearby Winston-Salem. The successful incorporation of nearby Wallburg inspired the formation of the Midway Incorporation Committee, which led the effort to make Midway a town. A petition drive in 2005 gathered the required signatures of 51 percent of the voting population within the proposed town limits. In April 2005, the city of Winston-Salem granted the incorporation committee the approval to seek incorporation with a few minor changes to the proposed town limits, a necessary step required by the Constitution of North Carolina. An act of incorporation was then submitted to the North Carolina General Assembly for approval (Senate Bill S1852), which was unanimously ratified on June 29, 2006. The act passed by the General Assembly officially established the "Town of Midway", which encompasses nearly 8 square miles (21 km^{2}); it also gave the newly formed municipality its governing document, known as a town charter. Midway is Davidson County's fifth and newest incorporated municipality. Norman Wilkes was the town's first (interim) mayor, and held the title until official elections in 2007, when George Byrum became the town's first elected mayor.

== Education ==
Midway is home to Midway Elementary School, a K-5 grade school, which is part of the Davidson County School System. The school feeds mostly into Oak Grove Middle and Oak Grove High school, which are new and just down the road. According to attendance area maps, a few students will attend North Davidson Middle (grades 6–8) and North Davidson High (grades 9-12), both located in neighboring Welcome.

== Notable people ==
- Patrick Denard Douthit aka 9th Wonder, record producer
- Terry Labonte, Hall of Fame NASCAR driver
- Wilmer David "Vinegar Bend" Mizell, Major League Baseball pitcher and U.S. congressman
- Shy Tuttle, defensive tackle for the New Orleans Saints
