= Good Hope Methodist Church Cemetery =

Historic cemetery in North Carolina, United States

- U.S. National Register of Historic Places
- Location within North Carolina Location within the United States
- Location: Junction of NC 150 and SR 1445, near Welcome, North Carolina
- Coordinates: 35°55′45″N 80°20′11″W
- Area: 2 acres (0.81 ha)
- MPS: Anglo-German Cemeteries TR
- NRHP reference No.: 84002007
- Added to NRHP: July 10, 1984

Good Hope Methodist Church Cemetery is a historic church cemetery located near Welcome, Davidson County, North Carolina. It is associated with the Good Hope Methodist Church, founded about 1836. It contains approximately 350 burials, with the earliest gravestone dated to 1834. It features a unique collection of folk gravestones by local stonecutters erected in Davidson County in the late-18th and first half of the 19th centuries.

It was listed on the National Register of Historic Places in 1984.
