= Beulah Church of Christ Cemetery =

Historic cemetery in Davidson County, North Carolina, US

- U.S. National Register of Historic Places
- Location within North Carolina Location within the United States
- Location: SR 1457, near Welcome, North Carolina
- Coordinates: 35°53′16″N 80°16′43″W
- Area: 4 acres (1.6 ha)
- MPS: Anglo-German Cemeteries TR
- NRHP reference No.: 84001995
- Added to NRHP: July 10, 1984

Beulah Church of Christ Cemetery is a historic church cemetery associated with the Beulah Church of Christ near Welcome, Davidson County, North Carolina. It contains approximately 100 gravestones, with the earliest gravestone dated to 1799. It features a unique collection of folk gravestones by local stonecutters erected in Davidson County in the late-18th and first half of the 19th centuries.

It was listed on the National Register of Historic Places in 1984.
