= Hamilton Everhart Farm =

Historic farm in North Carolina, United States

- U.S. National Register of Historic Places
- Location within North Carolina Location within the United States
- Location: US 52, near Midway, North Carolina
- Coordinates: 35°55′46″N 80°13′31″W
- Area: 114 acres (46 ha)
- Built: c. 1860
- Architectural style: Greek Revival
- MPS: Davidson County MRA
- NRHP reference No.: 84002000
- Added to NRHP: July 10, 1984

Hamilton Everhart Farm was a historic farm complex located near Midway, Davidson County, North Carolina. The complex, built about 1860, included a two-story log house with Greek Revival style design elements, a free-standing log kitchen, a double pen log barn, and a small log potato house. It has been demolished by the late 20th century.

It was added to the National Register of Historic Places in 1984.
