= Bryce Williams (American football) =

American football player (born 1993)

Profile
- Position: Tight end

Personal information
- Born: February 24, 1993 (age 33); Winston-Salem, North Carolina, U.S.
- Listed height: 6 ft 6 in (1.98 m)
- Listed weight: 258 lb (117 kg)

Career information
- High school: North Davidson (Lexington, North Carolina)
- College: Marshall (2011); East Carolina (2012–2015)
- NFL draft: 2016: undrafted

Career history
- New England Patriots (2016)*; Los Angeles Rams (2016–2017)*; Seattle Seahawks (2017)*; Carolina Panthers (2017)*; Arizona Cardinals (2018)*; Arizona Hotshots (2019)
- * Offseason or practice squad member only

Awards and highlights
- First team All-AAC (2015)
- Stats at Pro Football Reference

Bryce Williams (born February 2, 1993) is an American former professional football tight end. He was signed by the New England Patriots as an undrafted free agent in 2016. He played college football at East Carolina after a brief tenure at Marshall.

== College career ==
=== Marshall ===
Williams was an invited walk-on for the 2011 season and made the team at Marshall but was redshirted. At the end of the season he decided to transfer to ECU.

=== East Carolina ===
Williams played three seasons for the ECU Pirates and recorded 96 catches for 1,040 yards and 13 touchdowns. Williams was named to the American Athletic Conference All-Conference Second-team as a Junior in 2014 and the All-Conference First-team following his Senior season in 2015.

== Professional career ==
=== New England Patriots ===
Williams signed with the New England Patriots as an undrafted free agent on May 6, 2016. He was waived by the Patriots on September 3, 2016.

=== Los Angeles Rams ===
On September 5, 2016, Williams was signed to the Los Angeles Rams' practice squad. He signed a reserve/future contract with the Rams on January 3, 2017 after spending his entire rookie season on the practice squad. On May 3, 2017, he was waived by the Rams.

=== Seattle Seahawks ===
Williams signed with the Seattle Seahawks on May 11, 2017. He was released on June 8, 2017.

=== Carolina Panthers ===
On August 3, 2017, Williams was signed by the Carolina Panthers. He was waived on September 1, 2017.

=== Arizona Cardinals ===
On April 11, 2018, Williams signed with the Arizona Cardinals. He was waived on September 1, 2018.

=== Arizona Hotshots ===
Williams signed with the Arizona Hotshots of the Alliance of American Football for the 2019 season. He was waived on February 21, 2019.
