= Brad Hoover =

American football player (born 1976)

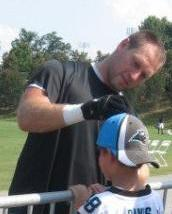
- Hoover signing autographs at the Panthers' training camp facility in Spartanburg, SC.

No. 45
- Position: Fullback

Personal information
- Born: November 11, 1976 (age 49); High Point, North Carolina, U.S.
- Listed height: 6 ft 0 in (1.83 m)
- Listed weight: 245 lb (111 kg)

Career information
- High school: Ledford (Thomasville, North Carolina)
- College: Western Carolina
- NFL draft: 2000: undrafted

Career history
- Carolina Panthers (2000–2009)

Career NFL statistics
- Rushing attempts: 284
- Rushing yards: 961
- Rushing touchdowns: 3
- Receptions: 145
- Receiving yards: 1,046
- Receiving touchdowns: 6
- Stats at Pro Football Reference

Bradley R. Hoover (born November 11, 1976) is an American former professional football player who was a fullback for the Carolina Panthers of the National Football League (NFL). He played college football for the Western Carolina Catamounts. He was signed by the Panthers as an undrafted free agent in 2000.

== Early life ==
Hoover was a Shrine Bowl participant and an all-state selection at Ledford Senior High School in Thomasville, North Carolina. He led the state with 2,662 yards rushing and scored 34 touchdowns as a senior. He earned Davidson County, North Carolina and Central Carolina Conference Player of the Year honors.

== College career ==
Hoover attended Western Carolina University, being second all-time in school history in career yards. In his junior season, he set a school rushing record with 1,663 yards, scoring 13 touchdowns in the process. He earned first-team All-Southern Conference honors as a result. His senior year, he followed up with 1,025 yards and 12 touchdowns, good enough for second-team All-SoCon. He became the second player in school history to post back-to-back 1,000 rushing yard seasons. His 3,616 career yards are second all-time in school history, and his 28 touchdowns place him fifth on the list.

In 2008, Hoover was inducted by Western Carolina University into the school's Athletics Hall of Fame.

== Professional career ==
=== Carolina Panthers ===
Hoover went undrafted in the 2000 NFL draft; he was later signed as a free agent by the Carolina Panthers. After a foot injury sidelined starting running back Tshimanga Biakabutuka, Hoover got two starts at tailback, including a Monday Night Football game against the Green Bay Packers where he became only the second rookie in team history to post a 100-yard game (Fred Lane was the first). After switching to fullback for his second season, he became the full-time starter in 2002. He caught two passes for touchdowns that season, the first touchdown receptions of his career. During the Panthers run to Super Bowl XXXVIII, he was the primary blocker for Stephen Davis, allowing Davis to rush for a team record 1,444 yards.

2004 saw Hoover miss the first game of his career due to injury, as he sat out several games with an injured hip. However, he still managed to contribute on offense, catching two touchdown passes and rushing for 246 yards.

On March 8, 2010, Hoover was released by the Panthers.

== After football ==
In March 2013 Hoover was hired as the head football coach of Union Academy, a charter school in Monroe, North Carolina. In January 2014, Hoover was named the head football coach at Marvin Ridge High School, also in Union County. He also served as the head football coach at Cannon School, an independent school in Concord, North Carolina.

== Career statistics ==
=== Regular season ===
			Rushing				Receiving
Season	Team	League	GP	Att	Yds	TD	Rec	Yds	TD
2000	Carolina	NFL	16	89	290	1	15	112	0
2001	Carolina	NFL	16	17	71	0	26	185	0
2002	Carolina	NFL	16	31	129	0	17	187	2
2003	Carolina	NFL	16	6	21	0	12	72	1
2004	Carolina	NFL	14	68	246	0	21	161	2
2005	Carolina	NFL	15	10	22	0	10	58	0
2006	Carolina	NFL	16	22	73	1	20	122	0
2007	Carolina	NFL	16	12	39	0	14	87	0
2008	Carolina	NFL	16	9	18	0	6	39	0
Regular season totals			141	264	909	2	141	1023	5

=== Playoffs ===
			Rushing				Receiving
Season	Team	League	GP	Att	Yds	TD	Rec	Yds	TD
2003-04	Carolina	NFL	4	4	12	1	5	35	0
2005-06	Carolina	NFL	3	2	0	0	3	22	0
2008-09	Carolina	NFL	1	0	0	0	1	7	0
Playoff totals			8	6	12	1	9	64	0
