= Salem Street Historic District =

Historic district in North Carolina, United States

- U.S. National Register of Historic Places
- U.S. Historic district
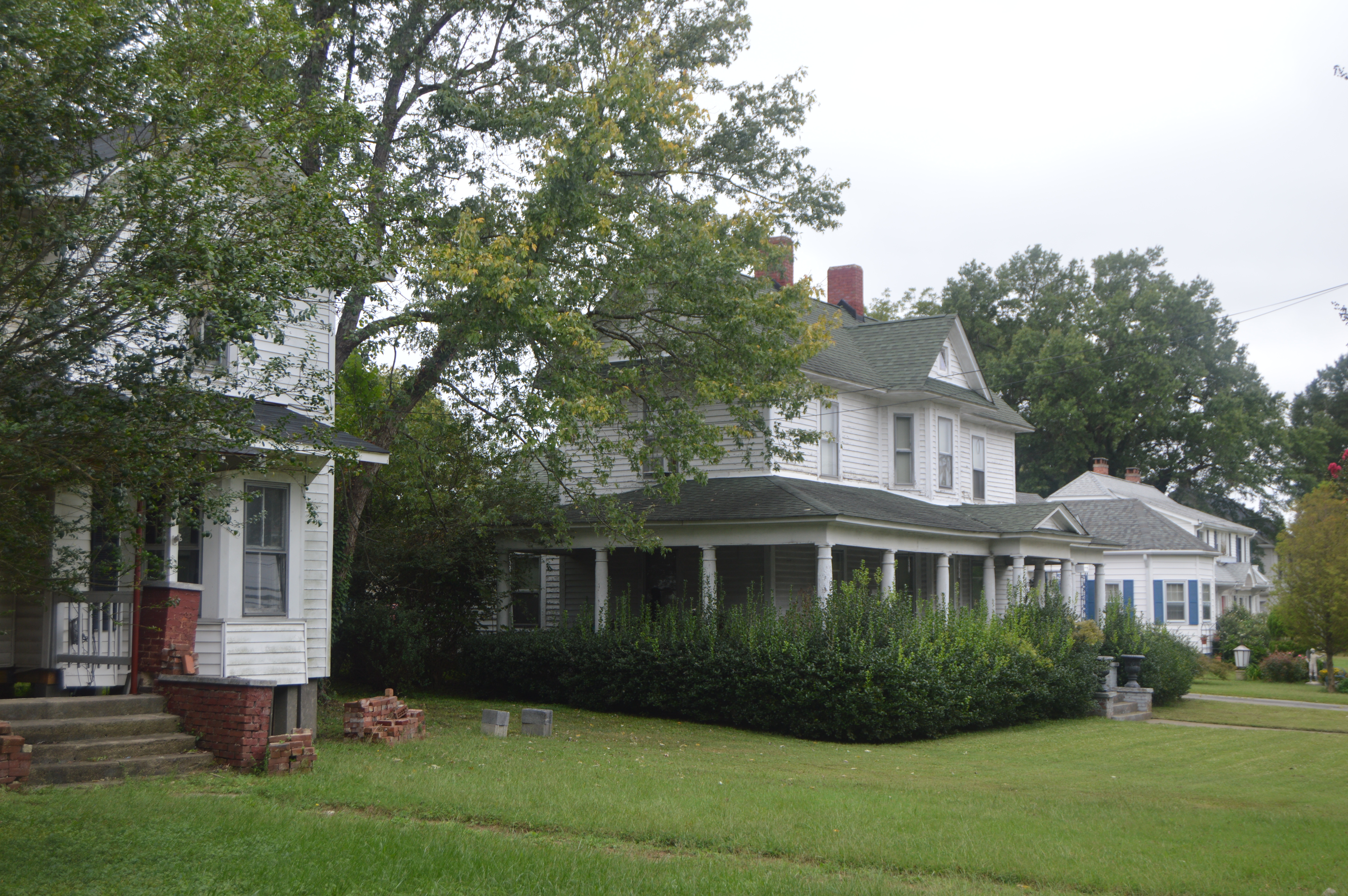
- Houses west of Heidelberg UCC

- Location within North Carolina Location within the United States
- Location: 108-301 Salem St., 6-12 Forsyth St., and 6 Leonard St., Thomasville, North Carolina
- Coordinates: 35°53′19″N 80°05′02″W
- Area: 16.5 acres (6.7 ha)
- Architect: Harry Simmon, Joseph Sawyer, et al.
- Architectural style: Colonial Revival, Queen Anne, et al.
- NRHP reference No.: 06000688
- Added to NRHP: August 9, 2006

Salem Street Historic District is a national historic district located in Thomasville, Davidson County, North Carolina, United States. The district encompasses 33 contributing buildings in a predominantly residential section of Thomasville. They were built between about 1861 and 1957, and include notable examples of Queen Anne and Colonial Revival style architecture. Notable buildings include the Heidelberg Church, St Paul's Episcopal Church, White House, Strickland-Long House, Morris-Harris House, and Leon A. Kress House.

It was added to the National Register of Historic Places in 2006.
