= Mickey Hawks =

American singer and pianist

David Michael "Mickey" Hawks (July 17, 1940 – August 31, 1989) was an American rock and roll Rockabilly singer and pianist, whose best remembered record, "Bip Bop Boom", has been included on many compilations of the genre after years as a collectible record.

He was born in Thomasville, North Carolina, moving with his family as a child to High Point. He learned piano as a child and listened to Ernest Tubb and Louis Armstrong records, before discovering the music of Little Richard in 1956. With his school friends, he formed a band, the Rhythm Rockers, and came to the attention of local disc jockey Moon Mullins, who had his own band, the Night Raiders. Hawks joined the Night Raiders as vocalist and pianist in 1958; the other members were Mullins (guitar, saxophone, vocals), Bill Ballard (guitar, vocals), John Owens (bass, vocals), and Bob Matthews (drums). Influenced by Gene Vincent's "Be-Bop-A-Lula", Hawks wrote "Bip Bop Boom", which they recorded in a Greensboro studio owned by Eddie Robbins. It became the B-side of their first single, "Rock and Roll Rhythm", a song Hawks co-wrote with Matthews, and was released on two local labels, Robbins Red (owned by Robbins) and Mart, before being picked up by the Profile label in Chicago. The label remixed the record, and moved "Bip Bop Boom" to the A-side. The single was credited to Mickey Hawks with Moon Mullins and his Night Raiders. It reportedly sold 50,000 copies in the Chicago area, but failed to reach the national charts; however, it did become a hit in South Africa.

The follow-up, "Cottonpickin'", was an instrumental, with "Hidi Hidi Hidi" featuring Hawks on the B-side. However, the record was not a hit. Hawks continued to record with Mullins and the Night Riders through to 1960, without repeating their early success, and the group stayed together playing in local clubs until splitting up in 1968. Hawks then recorded a duet with Gwynn Kellum. After "Bip Bop Boom" became popular among rock and roll audiences in Europe, Hawks performed several times there at festivals, and recorded an album, Invites You to Go Back in Time with Mickey Hawks & the Sounds of the 50s. He continued to perform occasionally until his death in 1989 at the age of 49.
