= Arcadia, North Carolina =

- Unincorporated community
- Location within the state of North Carolina
- Coordinates: 35°56′51″N 80°18′32″W
- Country: United States
- State: North Carolina
- County: Davidson
- Elevation: 833 ft (254 m)
- Time zone: UTC-5 (Eastern (EST))
  - Summer (DST): UTC-4 (EDT)
- ZIP codes: 27295
- Area code: 336
- GNIS feature ID: 980274

Arcadia is an unincorporated community in Davidson County, North Carolina, United States. It is located in the northwestern section of the county along NC Highway 150. Neighboring communities and municipalities include Midway, Welcome and Winston-Salem.

== History ==
The area was, in previous years, highly agricultural. However, this has changed due to an increase in housing development and the decreased viability of small scale agriculture. Small farms are not totally eradicated though, examples being Robana Farms and Twin Cedar Farm.

Hampton House was added to the National Register of Historic Places in 1984.

== Education ==
Arcadia is the location of Northwest and Friedberg Elementary Schools, both part of the Davidson County School System. The two schools feed into North Davidson Middle and North Davidson High (both in Welcome).

== Fire Department ==
Arcadia is served by the A-RC-H (Arcadia-Reedy Creek-Hampton) Volunteer Fire Department, the Midway Volunteer Fire Department, as well as the Griffith Volunteer Fire Department which is located on Peters Creek Pkwy in Forsyth County.

== Development ==
Arcadia is mostly a residential community with a few commercial establishments, and a declining number of farms. There is a mixture of businesses including: retail chains and restaurants The area is, however, beginning to grow as Winston-Salem expands.

Much of the community's vacant land is being excavated for housing development, as many attempt to escape higher property taxes in nearby Forsyth County.
