= Mitchell House (Thomasville, North Carolina) =

Historic house in North Carolina, United States

Mitchell House Museum
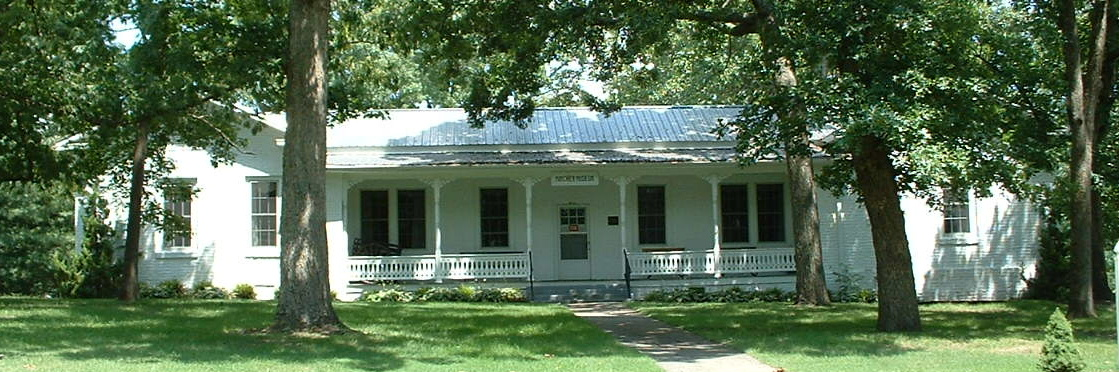
- Established: 1982
- Location: Mills Home, Thomasville, NC, USA
- Coordinates: 35.877802°N 80.093969°W
- Type: Historical museum
- Curator: Lib Johnson
- Website: Baptist Children's Homes of North Carolina, Mitchell House Museum
- Mitchell House
- U.S. National Register of Historic Places
- Location within North Carolina Location within the United States
- Location: 411 Biggs Ave., Thomasville, North Carolina
- Coordinates: 35°52′39″N 80°5′38″W
- Architect: Peace, L.E.
- NRHP reference No.: 00001121
- Added to NRHP: September 20, 2000

The Mitchell House Museum was founded in 1982 as a project of the Mills Home Alumni Association. The museum is located in Thomasville, NC on the Mills Home Campus, the original campus of the Baptist Children's Homes of North Carolina. It occupies the oldest building on the Mills Home Campus.

== History ==
The Mitchell House, named for Rev. John Mitchell, was the first cottage on the Mills Home Campus, completed in 1885 to house girls at the orphanage.

It was added to the National Register of Historic Places in 2000.

== Exhibits ==
Exhibits at the Mitchell Museum are drawn from a number of sources, including antique equipment, furniture, and memorabilia formerly used in other Mills Home cottages and workshops, as well as additional alumni contributions.

Smaller rooms on either side of the two large central rooms were originally bedrooms for the orphans and matrons, the children's rooms sleeping 8-10 young girls in each. One of these rooms is furnished as it might have been in the 1930s. One contains antique medical and dental equipment rescued from the old infirmary. One room is devoted to the museum's collection of photographs, scrapbooks, and yearbooks.

== Hours and Admission ==
The Mitchell House Museum is open by appointment throughout most of the year. During Alumni Homecoming, held annually on the weekend of the first Sunday of August, the museum is open Saturday, 9:00 am – 5:00 pm and Sunday, 1:00 pm – 5:00 pm. Admission is free.
