= George W. Wall House =

Historic house in North Carolina, United States

- U.S. National Register of Historic Places
- Location within North Carolina Location within the United States
- Location: NC 109 and SR 1723, Wallburg, North Carolina
- Coordinates: 36°0′35″N 80°8′31″W
- Area: 1 acre (0.40 ha)
- Built: 1896
- Architectural style: Queen Anne, Queen Anne Revival
- MPS: Davidson County MRA
- NRHP reference No.: 84002161
- Added to NRHP: July 10, 1984

George W. Wall House is a historic home located at Wallburg, Davidson County, North Carolina. It was built in 1896, and is a two-story, three bay by two-bay, vernacular Queen Anne style frame dwelling. It features a deck-on-hip roof, decorative sawn woodwork, and a wraparound porch.

It was added to the National Register of Historic Places in 1984.
