= Oak Grove High School (North Carolina) =

American public school in North Carolina

Location
- 3507 Midway School Rd; Winston-Salem, North Carolina 27107; United States; 35°56′36″N 80°09′48″W

Information
- Type: Public
- Established: 2017 (9 years ago)
- Oversight: Davidson County Schools
- CEEB code: 340044
- Principal: Stefanie Stroud
- Teaching staff: 52.70 (FTE)
- Grades: 9–12
- Enrollment: 992 (2024-2025)
- Student to teacher ratio: 18.82
- Campus: Rural
- Colors: Black, Soul blue, Silver
- Athletics: NCHSAA 5A; Piedmont Triad 5A/6A Conference
- Mascot: Grizzlies
- Website: oghs.davidson.k12.nc.us

Oak Grove High School is a public high school in Midway, North Carolina, which opened in August 2017. The school is a part of the Davidson County Schools system, and is to help with the overcrowded Ledford Senior and North Davidson High Schools.

== History ==
Oak Grove High School first came to light in 2012, when the Davidson County Schools Board of Education approved a middle school in the Oak Grove area, to help with overcrowding at North Davidson and Ledford Middle schools. At the time, North Davidson High and Ledford Senior High were past max student capacity. The long-awaited news came when the board approved for a new high school to be built near the current Oak Grove Middle School, and a bid was formally accepted in November 2015, for Samet to start construction.

Hiring for Oak Grove began in early January 2017, with the posting guidance and athletic staff. Most of the school officially opened to students on August 28, 2017, (excludes the gym, Auxiliary gym, Fine Arts department, auditorium, and athletic facilities). The second half of the building opened on October 2, 2017.

For the first year of the school, it was only open to Freshman and Sophomores. Juniors were added in year two, and Seniors the following year. The Class of 2020 was Oak Grove's first graduating class, and the Class of 2021 was the first four-year graduating class.

== Feeder schools ==
- Friedberg Elementary School
- Midway Elementary School
- Wallburg Elementary School
- Oak Grove Middle School

== Athletics ==
The school is a part of the Piedmont Triad 5A/6A Conference. The 2018–19 school year was the first year the school had a varsity football team. The athletic director for Oak Grove is Stan Smith.

The sports teams of Oak Grove are:

- Baseball
- Basketball
- Cross Country
- Golf
- Football
- Soccer
- Softball
- Swimming
- Tennis
- Track and field
- Volleyball
- Wrestling

=== State Championships ===
Oak Grove has won the following North Carolina High School Athletic Association (NCHSAA) team state championships:

- Women's Golf: 2019 (1A/2A)
- Men's Cross Country (Team): 2025 (5A)
