= Thomasville Downtown Historic District =

Historic district in North Carolina, United States

- U.S. National Register of Historic Places
- U.S. Historic district
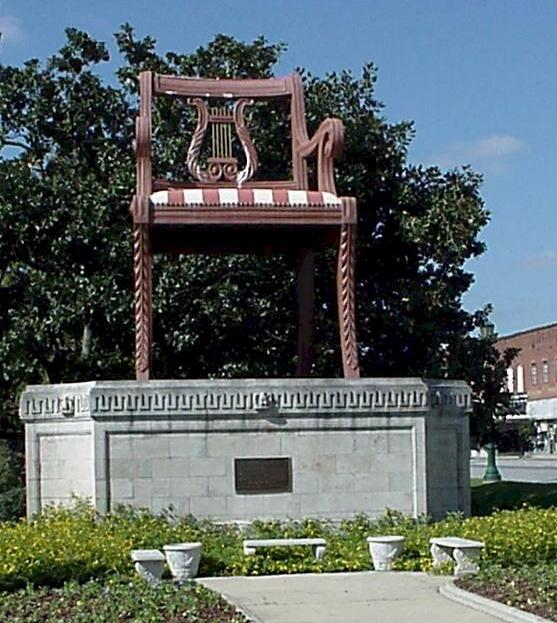
- The "Big Chair" on East Main

- Location within North Carolina Location within the United States
- Location: Roughly bounded by Main St., Trade St., Guilford St. and Commerce St., Thomasville, North Carolina
- Coordinates: 35°53′01″N 80°05′02″W
- Area: 27 acres (11 ha)
- Built: 1871
- Architect: Wetmore, James; Haskins, Albert L. Jr.
- Architectural style: Italianate, Classical Revival
- NRHP reference No.: 05000940
- Added to NRHP: September 1, 2005

Thomasville Downtown Historic District is a national historic district located at Thomasville, Davidson County, North Carolina. The district encompasses 46 contributing buildings, 1 contributing site, 2 contributing structures, and 2 contributing objects in the central business district of Thomasville. It includes commercial and governmental buildings built between 1871 and 1938. Located in the district is the separately listed Thomasville Railroad Passenger Depot. Other notable contributing resources include The Big Chair (1950), the former City Hall (1938), the former Davidson County Office Building, the former United States Post Office (1926), (former) Davidson County Office Building (1957), the Dr. Orien R. Hodgin Dental Office, the North State Telephone Warehouse (c. 1940), First National Bank of Thomasville (1922), C. R. Thomas Block (c. 1900), and the Lambeth Furniture Company/Thomasville Chair Company.

It was added to the National Register of Historic Places in 2005.
