= Madison Hedgecock =

American football player (born 1981)

- Hedgecock with the Lombardi Trophy in 2008

No. 44, 39
- Position: Fullback

Personal information
- Born: August 27, 1981 (age 45); Winston-Salem, North Carolina, U.S.
- Listed height: 6 ft 3 in (1.91 m)
- Listed weight: 266 lb (121 kg)

Career information
- High school: Ledford (Thomasville, North Carolina)
- College: North Carolina
- NFL draft: 2005: 7th round, 251st overall pick

Career history
- St. Louis Rams (2005–2007); New York Giants (2007–2010)

Awards and highlights
- Super Bowl champion (XLII); Second-team All-Pro (2008)

Career NFL statistics
- Receptions: 37
- Receiving yards: 233
- Receiving touchdowns: 2
- Stats at Pro Football Reference

Madison Smith Hedgecock (born August 27, 1981) is an American former professional football player who was a fullback in the National Football League (NFL) for seven seasons. He played college football for the University of North Carolina. He was selected by the St. Louis Rams in the seventh round of the 2005 NFL draft. An All-Pro selection in 2008, Hedgecock earned a Super Bowl ring with the New York Giants in Super Bowl XLII over the-then undefeated New England Patriots.

== Early life ==
Hedgecock attended Ledford Senior High School in Thomasville, North Carolina and was a student and a letterman in football, basketball and track & field. On the gridiron Hedgecock played fullback, tight end, and linebacker. He rushed for 1,799 yards and 17 touchdowns in 10 games as senior and rushed for 3,673 yards and 44 touchdowns in his high school career. He also was a three-time All-County and All-Conference selection (tight end as sophomore and fullback as junior and senior). Was named county offensive player of year in 1998 and 1999. Hedgecock was a Super Prep All-American and also earned honorable mention All-American from USA Today and Prep Star All-Region. In track, he competed in the 200 and 400 meters, hurdles, relays, and shot put and earned All-County and All-Conference honors in the shot put.

== College career ==
Hedgecock attended the University of North Carolina, where he played for the North Carolina Tar Heels football team from 2001 to 2004. A versatile athlete, he played running back, fullback and defensive end while rushing for 130 yards (118 as a senior) and 2 touchdowns while also recording 83 tackles (8.5 for losses) and 1.5 sacks, three fumble recoveries and two forced fumbles in his college career. His best performances running the ball were a 10-carry, 69-yard performance in a 30–24 victory over archrival North Carolina State and a 10-carry, 36-yard game in a 31–28 upset of fourth-ranked Miami, both during his senior year. He played fullback during redshirt freshman year for Tar Heels. He returned to fullback position for his senior season in 2004 after playing defensive end as sophomore and junior.

In 2003, as a junior, he played in all 12 games and started 11 at defensive end and made 55 tackles, 40 (solo) and 15 assists, six tackles for losses, 1.5 sacks, two fumble recoveries. In his sophomore season (2002) he played in all 12 games—he was the starting fullback in the first six games of the year, but moved to defensive end for the final six contests after injuries depleted the Carolina defensive line and played both positions against Wake Forest. He had three rushes for 11 yards, caught two passes for 7 yards and made 21 total tackles (11 solo, 10 assists) with 2.5 for losses.

Hedgecock was nicknamed "Big Cat." "Probably because I used to pace a lot before a game" and "I like seeing people run over people," said Hedgecock, who in college once bent the facemask on his helmet while delivering a ferocious blow. John Bunting, a former Rams assistant who was Hedgecock's head coach at North Carolina, said the nickname was "Suitable. He practices hard all the time, he runs around the field, he's the first to every drill. He's very energetic, very enthusiastic." Bunting moved Hedgecock to defensive end after his freshman season, then moved him back to fullback for his final season, as he had promised. Fullback was Hedgecock's preferred position and Bunting felt that his pro potential was there. Hedgecock graduated with a communications degree.

== Professional career ==
=== Pre-draft ===
Pre-draft measurables
Height	Weight	40-yard dash	10-yard split	20-yard split	20-yard shuttle	Three-cone drill	Vertical jump	Broad jump	Bench press	Wonderlic
6 ft 3 in (1.91 m)	266 lb (121 kg)	4.87 s	1.73 s	2.89 s	4.24 s	7.41 s	32 1/2 in (0.83 m)	9 ft 0 in (2.74 m)	29 reps	24
All values from NFL Combine.

His 440-pound bench press, 630-pound back squat, 385-pound power clean are UNC records for a fullback. He was called the "best blocking back" in the ACC by The Sporting News.

=== St. Louis Rams ===
Hedgecock spent his first two professional seasons with the St. Louis Rams after being selected in the seventh round of the 2005 NFL draft. Hedgecock's skills impressed his Rams coaches early. “He is a big hammer, a big lead blocker,” Martz said. “He fits into what we do in terms of running the football. He has nice soft hands and is a good receiver. These guys are so hard to find.” On July 15, 2005, Hedgecock signed a reported three-year $1.1 million contract. In what the St. Louis Post-Dispatch called "rapid improvement" he beat out veteran Joey Goodspeed for the fullback position for the Rams. Goodspeed, who had held the job for two seasons, was released. About the competition Mike Martz said, "It's a very healthy competition. The fullback position is kind of a lost art. It's just a brutal position. You've got to throw your body in there and just try to slam people. And those two guys, that's what they're about.

"Madison has really stepped up and done a nice job" Martz added. "In what we do (at) that fullback position is really a tight end or be on the line of scrimmage or we flex him. We do so many things over there that for a rookie to come in and absorb that is pretty difficult to do. He struggled a bit for awhile. I think he really has a better understanding of what we are trying to do right now." Hedgecock said he had a slight advantage coming in because of the system he was in at North Carolina. "My college offense the fullback was similar to here. They do a lot of moving and shifting and changing assignments. I guess other offenses might be different. There are a lot of similarities to here."

The Rams reportedly liked Hedgecock's size and were enamored with his devotion to lead blocking. "It can be a fun thing," said Hedgecock. "You see that tailback run for 100 yards, that's where I get my glory." Hedgecock filled that role according to interim head coach Joe Vitt. "He's getting better every single game," Vitt said. "He kind of reminds me of "Moose" Johnston. He's a force when he hits you." Rams running back coach Wilbert Montgomery added, "I like his attitude, he's a nasty kid. Coming out of school, he was an animal, he won't back down from you." Hedgecock added, "Lead blocking never changes. You just go in there and murder somebody."

Hedgecock was the lead blocker of Steven Jackson's stellar 2006 season despite being slowed by injuries. He sustain a high-ankle sprain in early August 2006, and was "gimpy" for 3½ weeks of training camp. "It feels a lot better," Hedgecock reported. "It's loosened up some, and it's starting to get back toward 100 percent. I was running last week, and I think that really broke up a lot of the scar tissue and got the blood flowing through it. It really helped." Later in the season Hedgecock broke his thumb but continued to play in a Rams 30–28 loss to Seattle. He did not miss any games with that injury or another subsequent ankle sprain even though the broken thumb required in-season surgery. Through those injuries Hedgecock played well. One veteran NFC scout told the St. Louis Post-Dispatch "Steven Jackson's one of the two, three best guys in the whole league. He's got everything it takes . . . But when they need to put a guy in there to lead-block, Madison Hedgecock's as good as anybody." In addition to his lead blocking role, Hedgecock was among the Rams leaders in tackles on special teams in 2005 and 2006 and was voted the Rams Outstanding Special Teams player in 2005.

Hedgecock was released following the first game of the regular season in 2007 and was replaced on the roster by Richard Owens, a fullback-tight end hybrid who had ties to Rams' then-head coach Scott Linehan from their time together with the Minnesota Vikings, as well a brief crossover as the University of Louisville. While Hedgecock was already regarded as one of the league's best pure blocking fullbacks., Owens never played another down in the NFL following his brief 14-game stint with St. Louis. Many saw the move as one of the most glaring examples of the ineptitude of Scott Linehan, particularly after Hedgecock signed with the Giants, played a key role in the running game during their Super Bowl winning season and signed a long-term contract extension.

=== New York Giants ===
Hedgecock was then claimed off waivers by the Giants on September 13, 2007. The Giants cut fullback Robert Douglas to make room for Hedgecock. At the time, the Giants were seeking a replacement for seven-year veteran Jim Finn, who had been placed on injured reserve with a torn labrum in his right shoulder. He signed a five-year, $5.5 million contract extension with the Giants on November 10, 2007.

According to press accounts, he was a major factor in the Giants' Super Bowl run. He was called by ESPN "a key component for their sixth-rated rushing attack" and that he "stepped into the lineup and provided the Giants with the kind of lead-blocking fullback they needed." The New York Daily News called Hedgecock an "unsung hero" on the Giants championship team. He was noted for his play against Tampa Bay, Dallas, and Green Bay. Against Tampa Bay, "Hedgecock manhandled linebacker Barrett Ruud and running back Brandon Jacobs followed him through a huge hole for an 8-yard touchdown that helped give the Giants a 14-7 lead." FOX announcer Joe Buck said on-air, "What were the Rams thinking letting this guy go?" during the Tampa Bay playoff game.

Against Dallas, Hedgecock blocked two players on an Amani Toomer touchdown in the first quarter and later delivered a key lead block on Bradie James on a Jacobs touchdown which drew raves from ESPN's Ron Jaworski among others. ""This kid's been phenomenal," Jaworski said as Hedgecock planted linebacker Bradie James." Former Eagles assistant coach Mike Kelly said, "For straight-ahead power football, this is clinic tape."

"Madison's arrival was very important and he has given us a physical presence at that position," offensive coordinator Kevin Gilbride said. "He's not overwhelmed by being one-on-one with those linebackers. We're not a West Coast fullback. When you're at fullback, you're in there to block. Maybe we'll throw you the ball once in a while. He fits the definition of the position for us." “Excellent fit,” coach Tom Coughlin added. “A physical, lead-blocking fullback that has good hands and can be a factor in the play-action game. And he’s done an outstanding job on special teams on the wedge on kickoff returns and has brought physical toughness to our team.”

Hedgecock started at fullback for the Giants in Super Bowl XLII. Hedgecock had one reception for 3 yards as the Giants defeated the New England Patriots 17–14. He is also credited with giving head coach Tom Coughlin the traditional 'Gatorade bath'.

During the Super Bowl media blitz Hedgecock was critical of Rams head coach Scott Linehan who was responsible for releasing him after Week One of the 2007 season. Hedgecock told a St. Louis radio station that Linehan was not well respected by many of the Rams players and was boring enough to put some players asleep. “The head coach brought in a player that he’d had in college,” Hedgecock told St. Louis radio station KSLG. Hedgecock also said about his release, “When you get fired, it’s a tough deal,” Hedgecock, the Giants’ fullback, said Wednesday after practice. “I didn’t think I did anything as a player to deserve it.” . . . “They could have at least brought in somebody that was good. He was the coach’s buddy. I don’t want to play for a buddy.”

On November 23, 2008, Hedgecock scored his first career touchdown against the Arizona Cardinals in the form of a 2-yard touchdown pass from Eli Manning. He was the lead blocker for two 1,000-yard rushers (Brandon Jacobs and Derrick Ward) for the 2008 New York Giants. With Hedgecock as the fullback the Giants rushed for over 2,500 yards and had a team rushing average of 5.0 yards a carry, both among the league leaders as the Giants ended with a 12–4 record. Mike Preston of the Baltimore Sun wrote, "Ravens inside linebacker Bart Scott says one of the major keys to stopping the Giants' running game is to stop fullback Madison Hedgecock in the hole. That sounds like an easy task, but it isn't especially since Hedgecock weighs 266 pounds."

After the 2008 season for the Giants, Hedgecock was voted as a First Alternate to the Pro Bowl and was a Second-team All-Pro by the Associated Press. He also drew praise from Hall of Fame tackle Dan Dierdorf, "Hedgecock won't ever lead the NFL in rushing but he'll lead block for a lot a yards and he's a gifted receiver with soft hands who runs good routes." Hedgeock also was named to the Sports Illustrated All-Pro team by Peter King who quipped, "Not sure, but I think he's got an anvil in his pads."

Giant teammate, All-Pro Justin Tuck told Pro Football Weekly, "Madison plays with reckless abandon, his tolerance for pain is just phenomenal". One of the backs who rushed for 1,000 yards in 2008, Brandon Jacobs added, "He makes good blocks all the time and that's what we need from him, to come out and do his job and he does it really well." Jacobs added, "When he flattens a guy, that makes us jump. That gets me excited when I see something like that, when he gets going with a full head of steam and then knocking somebody out. That's what he does, he puts people on their backs."

Said Hedgecock, "I just block. I just square my guys."

Hedgecock's impressive run blocking led to 1,000 rushing yards for both Brandon Jacobs and Derrick Ward during the 2008 NFL season. In 2009 Hedgecock played the season with a torn labrum for which he had off-season surgery. The following season, 2010, he had a hamstring injury that landed him on injured reserve after only four games that season.

He was released by the Giants on July 28, 2011, due to failing his physical. Hedgecock stated his degenerative disc disease in his back would likely end his career, "I'm old and beat up," Hedgecock said. "If I keep playing, it's going to get worse and worse. My hamstring (2010 injury), was because of the back being out of whack." He also wished his replacement well, "Hopefully, they can get somebody else to do what I used to do. Maybe one of the younger guys will step up and do a good job there."

Hedgecock said he was contacted by one of his former coaches (who then was a head coach on a team in the midwest) to see if he was physically able to play a role in blocking for a "consistent 1,500 rusher" but had to decline the invitation due to the severity of his back. He also heard from the head coach who once let him go, and "we buried the hatchet". "'He told me releasing me was as big a mistake as he made there and my replacement let him down'. "That made up for it and I never wish a man ill for things in that are in the past", said Hedgecock.

== Personal life ==
In his free time, Hedgecock enjoys farming and researching American history. He is particularly interested in the American Civil War. He is also a NASCAR fan. In addition, Madison hosts an annual summer football camp for children ages 7–18 at William Paterson University in Wayne, New Jersey.
