= Emanuel United Church of Christ Cemetery =

Historic cemetery in North Carolina, United States

- U.S. National Register of Historic Places
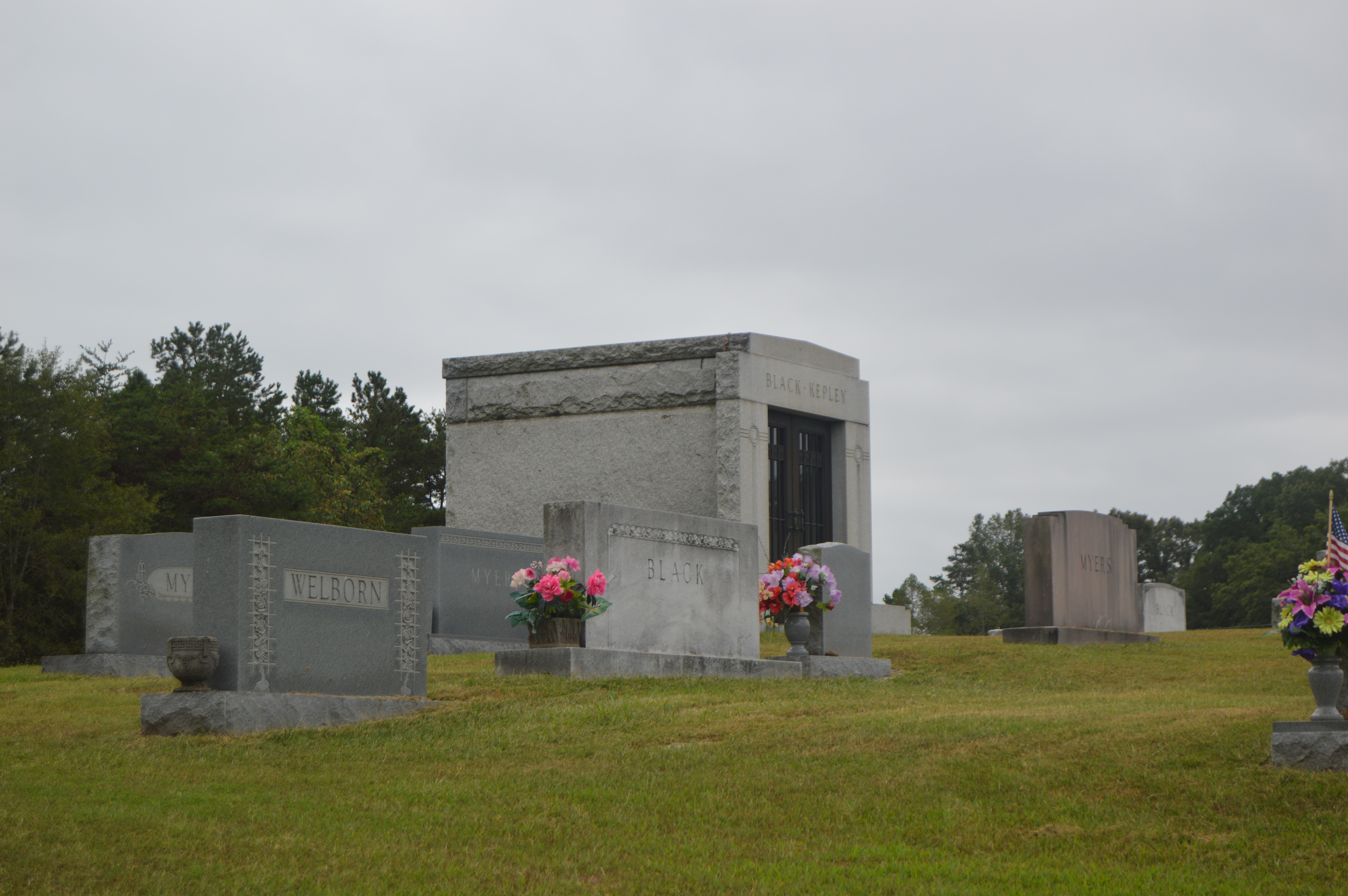
- Mausoleum and other grave markers

- Location within North Carolina Location within the United States
- Location: SR 2060, near Thomasville, North Carolina
- Coordinates: 35°50′34″N 80°6′56″W
- Area: 2 acres (0.81 ha)
- MPS: Anglo-German Cemeteries TR
- NRHP reference No.: 84001997
- Added to NRHP: July 10, 1984

Emanuel United Church of Christ Cemetery is a historic church cemetery associated with the Emanuel United Church of Christ near Thomasville, Davidson County, North Carolina. It contains approximately 500 gravestones, with the earliest gravestone dated to 1808. It features a unique collection of folk gravestones by local stonecutters erected in Davidson County in the late-18th and first half of the 19th centuries.

It was listed on the National Register of Historic Places in 1984.
