= Church Street School swimming pool =

Listed building in Glasgow, Scotland

Coordinates: 55°52′16″N 04°17′53″W

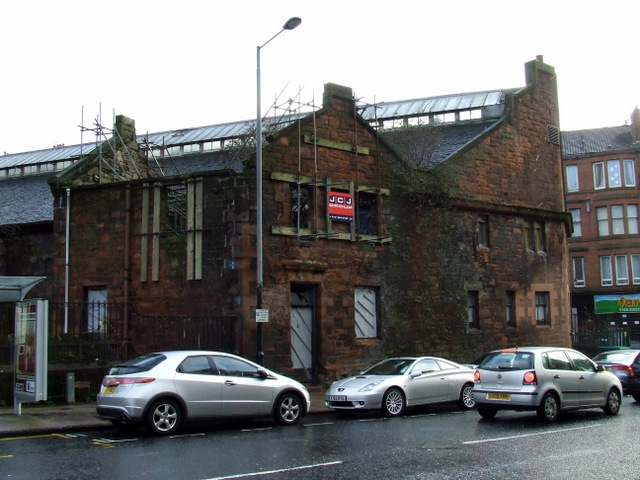
View from the B808 showing janitor's house and north-west elevation, 2012

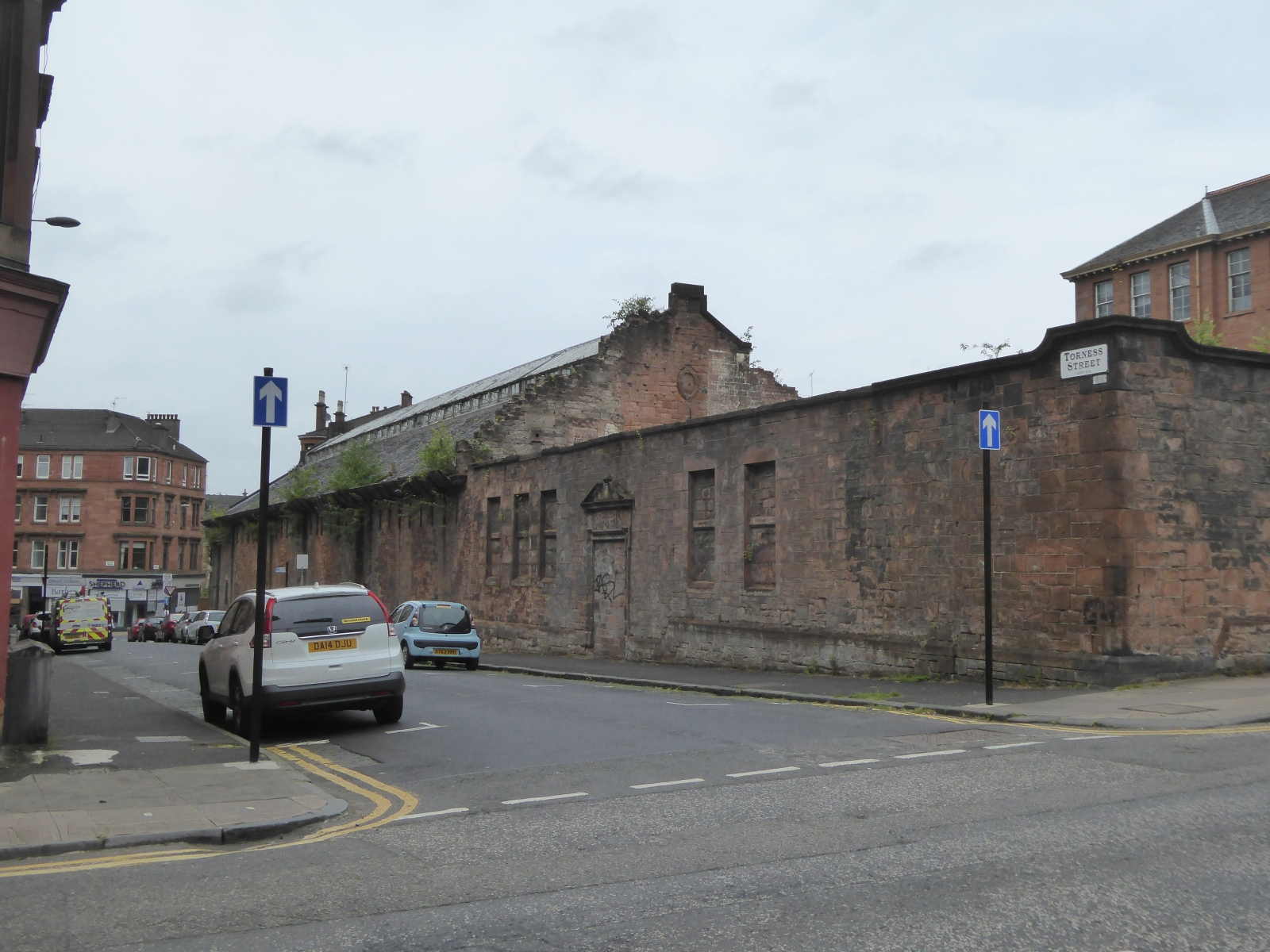
View along Torness Street from Church Street, 2017

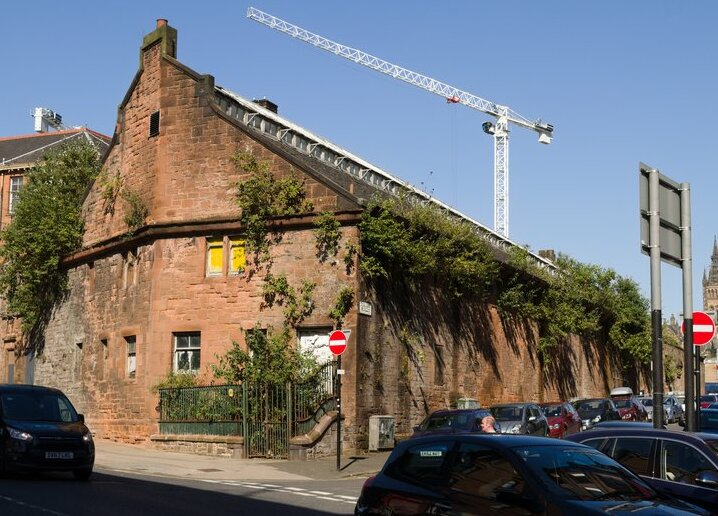
View along Torness Street from B808, 2019

The Church Street School swimming pool is a category C listed building in Glasgow, Scotland. It was built in 1904 as part of the redevelopment of the school by the local authority. The school closed in 1976 but the pool remained in use as a public facility until its closure in 1997. The building has remained unused since then, though the school now serves as offices for Glasgow City Council's health and social care team. The structure has fallen into disrepair and has been listed on the Buildings at Risk Register for Scotland since 1999. A redevelopment of the site is planned by the council.

== History ==
The site formerly housed the private Partick Academy. School boards were established in Scotland under the Education (Scotland) Act 1872 to provide education to the general public. The Partick Academy moved to new premises from 1877 and the following year the site was purchased by the Govan Parish School Board for £3,000 (equivalent to £308,700 in 2025). The school had 683 pupils by the mid-1890s when it was decided to demolish the structure and erect one with a larger capacity. The new school was built in 1903, with separate entrances, stairwells and playgrounds for 1,308 boys and girls.

The swimming pool, designed like the main school by Donald Bruce and Edward A. B. Hay, was built in 1904. The school closed in 1976 but the swimming pool remained in operation as a public facility until 1997. The entire former school complex was scheduled for demolition but saved by a campaign by local residents which led to the granting of statutory protection as listed buildings for much of the complex. The swimming pool structure received category C listing by Historic Environment Scotland (HES) in 2002. A 2022 Glasgow Times article noted that "the pool was one of the school's most unusual features: not many were built and still fewer survive" and HES noted that it was "a rare survival of its type". The school has since become offices for Glasgow City Council's health and social care team, though the pool structure was left empty.

The structure has been on the Buildings at Risk Register for Scotland since 8 October 1999. Visits by inspectors were made in 2004, 2007 and 2014. Some of the non-listed buildings on the site have been demolished and the roof of a janitor's house, attached to the swimming pool, has been removed. The structure is noted by the register as being in poor condition and at high risk of damage. The structure has been entered by urban explorers.

In August 2022, local residents raised concerns that the structure might be demolished after noticing Glasgow City Council fencing and signage on the site. In October, the council confirmed they were planning a redevelopment of the site and could not rule out demolition. In December 2022, the council notified the Buildings at Risk Register of their intention to remove vegetation from the structure and carry out some stabilisation work.

== Description ==
The swimming pool is located at the western side of the southern boundary of the school site, a triangular plot bounded by Church Street to the east, the B808 to the west, and Torness Street to the south. The structure is long and almost rectangular in plan, with the western elevation skewed to conform to the adjacent B808 road. The pool building is two storeys in height and incorporates a gymnasium. The façade of the structure runs along the back of the footway on Torness Street and for much of the western elevation, where it has a very small front yard at the south-west.

The structure is built from roughly dressed red sandstone ashlars laid in a snecked pattern, though the corners are formed from smoothly dressed ashlars. A pulvinated course runs at the top of the eaves, which are bracketed. On the west elevation a corniced stringcourse runs at the level of the top of the first floor. The roof features a raised rooflight along the entire ridgeline. The 2-storey janitor's house is attached to the north side of the structure on the western elevation.

Few windows remain intact and buddleia is growing within the structure. The walls are damp and mossy and the structure is partly supported by scaffolding. The interior features wrought iron decoration including ornate bannisters to the first floor viewing area, original tiles and clock.
