= Church Street School (Thomasville, North Carolina) =

Historic school building in North Carolina, United States

- U.S. National Register of Historic Places
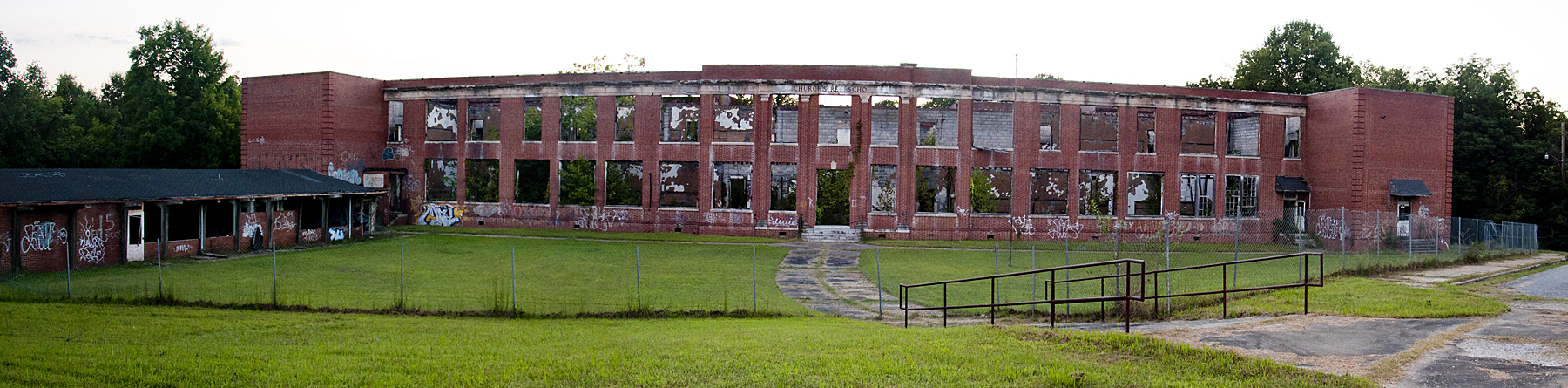
- Church Street School, September 2012

- Location within North Carolina Location within the United States
- Location: Jasper St., W of Church St., Thomasville, North Carolina
- Coordinates: 35°53′21″N 80°5′21″W
- Area: 5.7 acres (2.3 ha)
- Built: 1935-1937
- Built by: Stewart, R.K.
- Architect: Wallace, William Roy
- Architectural style: Colonial Revival
- NRHP reference No.: 90000355
- Added to NRHP: March 1, 1990

Church Street School is a historic school building for African-American students located at Thomasville, Davidson County, North Carolina. It was built in 1935–1937, and is a two-story, T-shaped, Colonial Revival-style brick building. A two-story auditorium projects from the rear of the main building. Two-story wings built in 1951 flank the original building. A gymnasium was built the same year. Some funding for school construction was provided by the Public Works Administration.

It was added to the National Register of Historic Places in 1990.
