= Shy Tuttle =

American football player (born 1995)

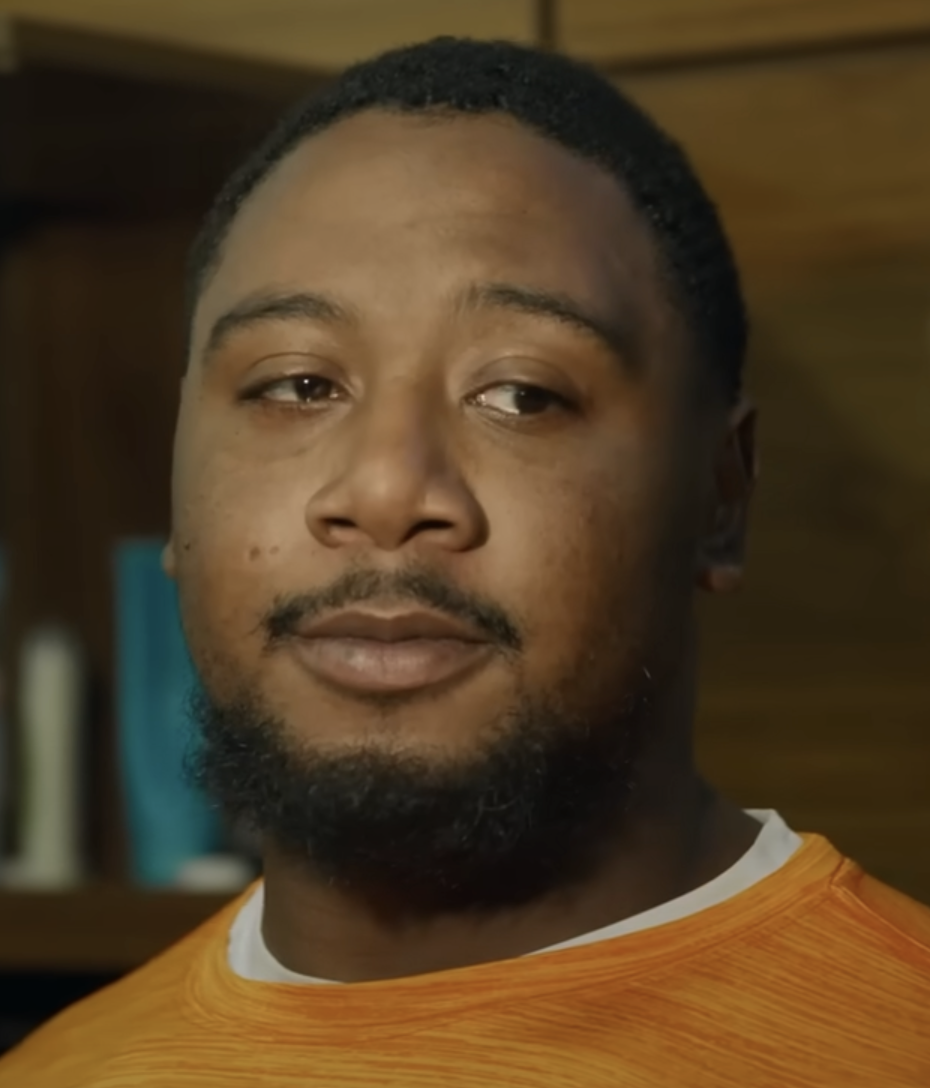
- Tuttle in 2025

No. 96 – Washington Commanders
- Position: Nose tackle
- Roster status: Active

Personal information
- Born: October 20, 1995 (age 31); Lexington, North Carolina, U.S.
- Listed height: 6 ft 3 in (1.91 m)
- Listed weight: 300 lb (136 kg)

Career information
- High school: North Davidson (Lexington)
- College: Tennessee (2015–2018)
- NFL draft: 2019: undrafted

Career history
- New Orleans Saints (2019–2022); Carolina Panthers (2023–2024); Tennessee Titans (2025); Washington Commanders (2025–present)

Career NFL statistics as of 2025
- Total tackles: 247
- Sacks: 4.5
- Forced fumbles: 2
- Fumble recoveries: 3
- Pass deflections: 22
- Interceptions: 1
- Stats at Pro Football Reference

Shyheim Devonte Tuttle (born October 20, 1995) is an American professional football nose tackle for the Washington Commanders of the National Football League (NFL). Tuttle played college football for the Tennessee Volunteers and has also played for the NFL's New Orleans Saints, Carolina Panthers, and Tennessee Titans.

== Early life ==
Tuttle was born on October 20, 1995, and grew up in Midway, North Carolina. He attended North Davidson High School, where he was a member of the basketball, football, and track and field teams. He made 315 career tackles, 66 tackles for loss, and 35 sacks as a four-year starter for the Black Knights, and was named All-Northwest North Carolina in each of his final three seasons and was played in the 2015 Under Armour All-American Game.

== College career ==
Tuttle played four seasons for the Tennessee Volunteers. His freshman season was cut short after only six games, recording 10 tackles and a fumble recovery, after suffering a broken fibula and tearing a ligament in his ankle against Georgia. Tuttle's sophomore year also ended prematurely when he sustained a season-ending injury in his first career start against South Carolina. In his junior season, Tuttle played in 10 games (four starts) and made 27 tackles (2.5 for loss). As a senior, he started all 12 of Tennessee's games and made 33 tackles (2.5 for loss), with one sack, an interception, and two blocked kicks.

== Professional career ==
Pre-draft measurables
Height	Weight	Arm length	Hand span	Wingspan	40-yard dash	10-yard split	20-yard split	20-yard shuttle	Three-cone drill	Vertical jump	Broad jump	Bench press
6 ft 2 3/8 in (1.89 m)	290 lb (132 kg)	33 3/8 in (0.85 m)	9 3/4 in (0.25 m)	6 ft 7 1/4 in (2.01 m)	4.93 s	1.75 s	2.88 s	4.66 s	7.40 s	28.0 in (0.71 m)	9 ft 2 in (2.79 m)	21 reps
All values from Pro Day

=== New Orleans Saints ===
Tuttle signed with the New Orleans Saints as an undrafted free agent on April 27, 2019. He made his NFL debut September 9, 2019, starting the season opener against the Houston Texans and recorded a combined sack of Deshaun Watson. In Week 13 against the Atlanta Falcons on Thanksgiving Day, Tuttle garnered national attention after recording his first career interception off a pass thrown by Matt Ryan in the 26–18 victory and stiff arming Ryan onto the turf. Tuttle played in all 16 of the Saints' games during the regular season and made 18 tackles (three for loss) with two sacks, four passes defended with an interception, and made three tackles, including one for loss, with two passes defended in the Saints loss against the Minnesota Vikings in the Wild Card Round of the playoffs.

In the 2020 season, Tuttle appeared in 13 regular-season games and made three starts. He appeared in both of the Saints' playoff games. In the 2021 season, Tuttle appeared in all 17 games and made 15 starts. In the 2022 season, Tuttle once again appeared in all 17 games and made 15 starts. He had two sacks, 49 total tackles (26 solo), and five passes defended.

=== Carolina Panthers ===
On March 15, 2023, Tuttle signed a three-year, $19.5 million contract with the Carolina Panthers. In the 2023 season, Tuttle started in all 17 games. He had a half-sack, 43 total tackles (19 solo), and five passes defended. In the 2024 season, Tuttle started 15 games. He had 46 tackles, three passes defended, and one forced fumble.

On August 26, 2025, Tuttle was released by the Panthers as part of final roster cuts.

=== Tennessee Titans ===
On August 27, 2025, Tuttle signed with the Tennessee Titans. He made 10 appearances (one start) for Tennessee, recording 11 combined tackles. Tuttle was released by the Titans on December 20.

=== Washington Commanders ===
On December 22, 2025, Tuttle was claimed off waivers by the Washington Commanders.

Tuttle signed a one-year extension with the Commanders on March 9, 2026. He was released by Washington as a part of final roster cuts on August 30. The following day, Tuttle re–signed with the Commanders.

== Personal life ==
Tuttle is the nephew of former professional wide receiver Perry Tuttle.
