= North Davidson High School =

American public school in North Carolina

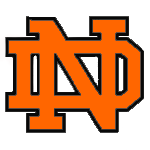

Location
- 7227 Old U.S. 52; Lexington, North Carolina 27295; United States; 35°55′27″N 80°14′48″W

Information
- Other names: North Davidson, NDHS, North
- Type: Public
- Established: 1952 (74 years ago)
- Oversight: Davidson County Schools
- CEEB code: 342280
- Principal: Jason Israel
- Teaching staff: 52.63 (FTE)
- Grades: 9–12
- Enrollment: 904 (2023–2024)
- Student to teacher ratio: 17.18
- Campus type: Rural
- Colors: Orange, Black, White
- Slogan: "Great day to be a black knight"
- Athletics conference: 5-A; Piedmont Triad Conference
- Mascot: Black Knight
- Rivals: Central Davidson High School, Ledford High School; Lexington Senior High School
- Yearbook: Nordahi
- Website: ndhs.davidson.k12.nc.us

North Davidson High School (commonly referred to as "NDHS," or simply "North") is a public high school in Welcome, North Carolina (near Lexington). It was established in 1952 and is located along Old US Highway 52 in northern Davidson County. The high school serves the Welcome, Arcadia and Midway areas.

== Feeder schools ==
- Friedburg Elementary
- Midway Elementary
- Northwest Elementary
- Welcome Elementary
- North Davidson Middle

== Athletics ==
North Davidson is a member of the North Carolina High School Athletic Association (NCHSAA) and are classified as a 5A school. The school is a member of the Piedmont Triad 5A/6A Conference. The school's mascot is the Black Knight, although female athletic teams often use the term "Lady Knights".

The school's athletics logo is an interlocking "ND" in orange, black, and white colors. It is copied from the University of Notre Dame athletics logo. Other North Davidson logos feature black knights riding upon a horse in armor.

Listed below are the following sports offered at North Davidson:

- Baseball
- Basketball
- Cross Country
- Cheerleading
- Football
- Golf
- Lacrosse
- Soccer
- Softball
- Swimming
- Tennis
- Track
- Volleyball
- Wrestling

== Notable alumni ==
- Austin Beck, former professional baseball player, sixth overall pick in the 2017 Major League Baseball draft
- Jim Bretz, baseball scout and former college baseball coach
- Christopher Dunn, 2022 Lou Groza Award winner at NC State
- Nia Franklin, Miss America 2019
- Griff Garrison, professional wrestler signed to All Elite Wrestling
- Trey Hutchens, professional stock car racing driver
- Debbie Leonard, former Duke University Women's Basketball coach and television commentator
- David Mathis, PGA Tour golfer
- Levi Michael, former professional baseball player
- Perry Tuttle, former NFL and CFL wide receiver
- Shy Tuttle, NFL defensive tackle for the Washington Commanders
- Bryce Williams, NFL and AAF tight end
