= Thomasville, North Carolina =

- City
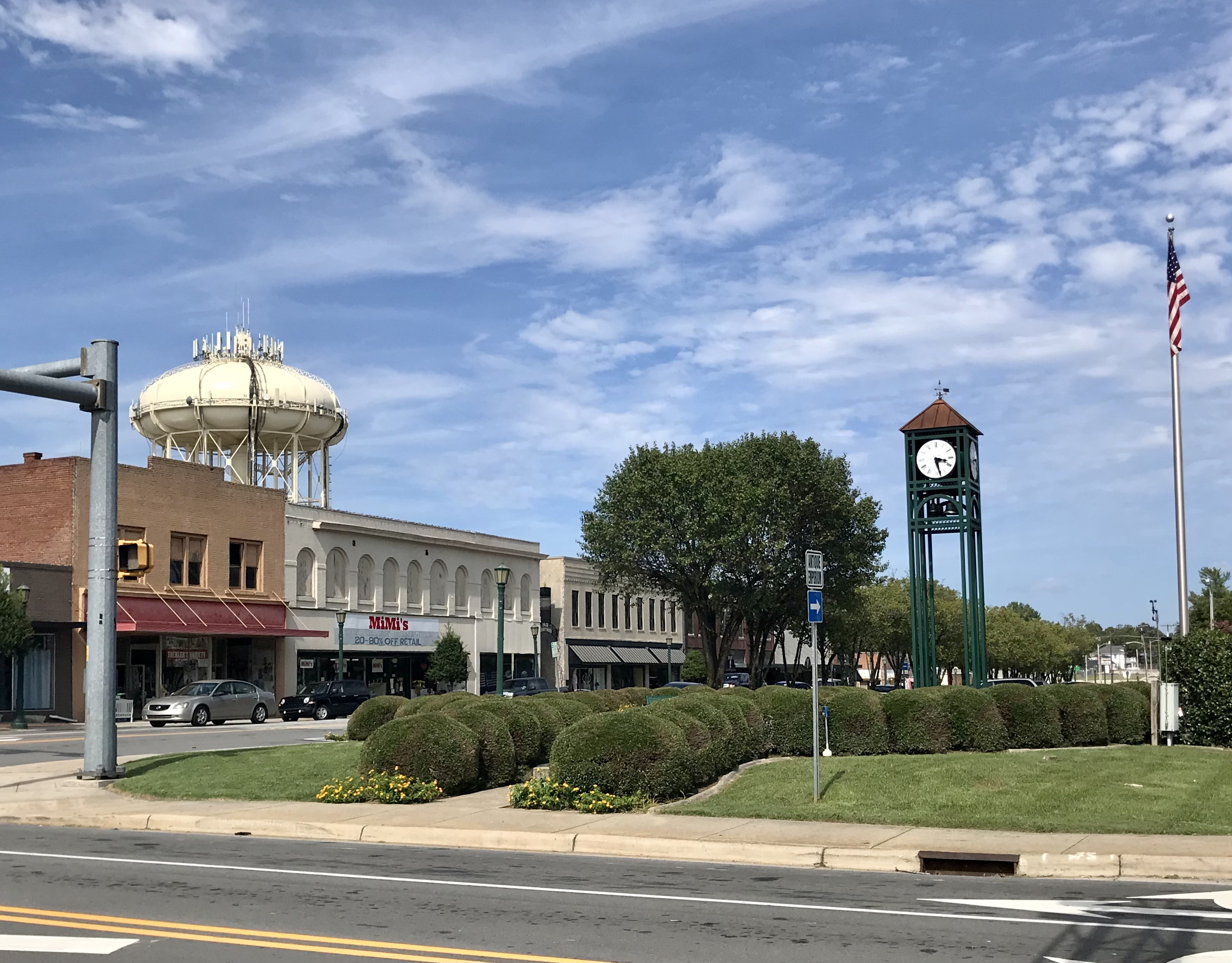

- Seal
- Nicknames: T-Ville, T-Vegas, Chair City, Tater Town
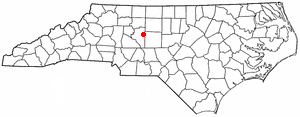
- Location in Davidson County and the state of North Carolina
- Coordinates: 35°52′53″N 80°04′51″W
- Country: United States
- State: North Carolina
- Counties: Davidson, Randolph
- Incorporated: 1857

Government
  - Mayor: Raleigh F York, Jr

Area
  - Total: 16.78 sq mi (43.47 km^{2})
  - Land: 16.77 sq mi (43.43 km^{2})
  - Water: 0.012 sq mi (0.03 km^{2})
- Elevation: 827 ft (252 m)

Population (2020)
  - Total: 27,183
  - Density: 1,621.0/sq mi (625.89/km^{2})
- Time zone: UTC−5 (EST)
  - Summer (DST): UTC−4 (EDT)
- ZIP codes: 27360-27361
- Area code: 336
- FIPS code: 37-67420
- GNIS feature ID: 2405585
- Website: www.thomasville-nc.gov

Thomasville is a city in Davidson County, North Carolina, United States, with portions extending into Randolph County. The population was 27,183 at the 2020 census. The city was once notable for its furniture industry, as were its neighbors High Point and Lexington. This Piedmont Triad community was established in 1852 and hosts the state's oldest festival, "Everybody's Day".

== History ==
John Warwick Thomas was born June 27, 1800, and by age 22 owned 384 acres (155 ha) in the Cedar Lodge area after marrying Mary Lambeth, daughter of Moses Lambeth. By age 30 he was a state representative. In 1848 he became a state senator. He pushed to get a railroad built through Davidson County and even invested money. Knowing the railroad was coming, Thomas built the community's first store in 1852 at present-day West Main and Salem streets, and the community was named "Thomasville" for its founder. In 1855 the North Carolina Railroad was built through Davidson County, reaching Thomasville November 9. On January 8, 1857, Thomasville was incorporated and occupied one square mile, with the railroad dividing the town into north and south sections.

In 1860 Thomasville had 308 people. After the Civil War the town had only 217 residents, but by 1880 the population was 450, reaching 751 by 1890.

Long Bill Whiteheart may have been the first to make furniture; he made split-bottom chairs at home. D.S. Westmoreland also made chairs at home starting in 1866, and his factory on what became Randolph Street went up in 1879 but burned in 1897 and was not rebuilt. The oldest plant still standing as of 1990 was that of Standard Chair, built in 1898. Other furniture companies were Lambeth Furniture, Thompson Chair, and Queen Chair Company.

Cramer Furniture was said to be the South's second largest furniture company in 1901. Thomasville Chair, started in 1904, soon became the town's leading furniture manufacturer. By 1916, 2,000 chairs a day were being made citywide.

By 1909 Jewel Cotton Mills and Amazon Cotton Mills gave Thomasville another industry, textiles. Sellers Hosiery Mills of Burlington opened in 1913, and Thomasville Hosiery in 1916.

The Abbott's Creek Primitive Baptist Church Cemetery, Brummell's Inn, Church Street School, Emanuel United Church of Christ Cemetery, Shadrach Lambeth House, Mitchell House, Randolph Street Historic District, Salem Street Historic District, Smith Clinic, Thomasville Downtown Historic District, and Thomasville Railroad Passenger Depot are listed on the National Register of Historic Places.

== Big Chair ==
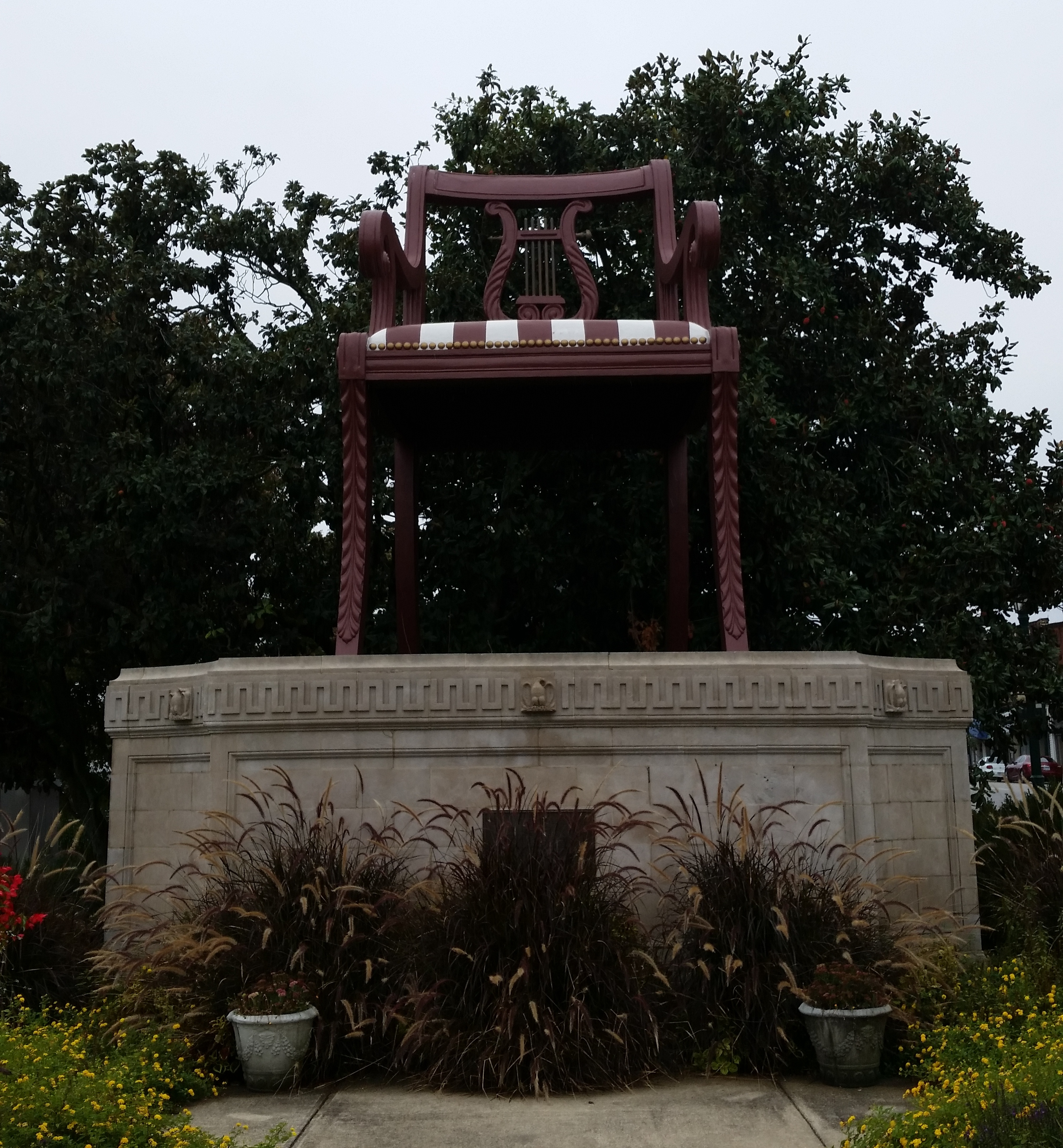
The Big Chair

Thomasville is commonly referred to as the "Chair Town" or "Chair City", in reference to a 30-foot (9.1 m) landmark replica of a Duncan Phyfe armchair that rests in the middle of the city. The original "Big Chair" was constructed in 1922 by the now-defunct Thomasville Furniture Industries (formerly the Thomasville Chair Company) out of lumber and Swiss steer hide to reflect the city's prominent furniture industry. However, this chair was scrapped in 1936 after 15 years of exposure to the weather. In 1951, a larger concrete version of the chair was erected with the collaboration of local businesses and civic organizations and still remains today. The Big Chair gained national attention in 1960 when then presidential candidate Lyndon B. Johnson greeted supporters on the monument during a campaign whistle stop. Although larger ones have been built, many Thomasville residents still boast that the Big Chair between the two Main Streets is the "World's Largest Chair".

== Geography ==
Thomasville is located in northeastern Davidson County and is bordered to the east by the city of Trinity in Randolph County.

According to the United States Census Bureau, the city of Thomasville has a total area of 16.8 square miles (43.5 km^{2}), of which 0.01 square miles (0.03 km^{2}), or 0.07%, is water.

=== Climate ===
Climate data for Thomasville, North Carolina
Month	Jan	Feb	Mar	Apr	May	Jun	Jul	Aug	Sep	Oct	Nov	Dec	Year
Record high °F (°C)	83 (28)	85 (29)	90 (32)	96 (36)	100 (38)	105 (41)	105 (41)	105 (41)	104 (40)	94 (34)	89 (32)	80 (27)	105 (41)
Mean daily maximum °F (°C)	51 (11)	56 (13)	64 (18)	74 (23)	80 (27)	87 (31)	90 (32)	88 (31)	82 (28)	73 (23)	63 (17)	53 (12)	72 (22)
Daily mean °F (°C)	41 (5)	45 (7)	52 (11)	61 (16)	68 (20)	76 (24)	79 (26)	78 (26)	72 (22)	61 (16)	52 (11)	43 (6)	61 (16)
Mean daily minimum °F (°C)	30 (−1)	33 (1)	39 (4)	48 (9)	56 (13)	65 (18)	68 (20)	68 (20)	61 (16)	49 (9)	41 (5)	33 (1)	49 (10)
Record low °F (°C)	−7 (−22)	−2 (−19)	7 (−14)	22 (−6)	25 (−4)	39 (4)	47 (8)	41 (5)	34 (1)	19 (−7)	10 (−12)	0 (−18)	−7 (−22)
Average precipitation inches (mm)	3.69 (94)	3.80 (97)	4.12 (105)	3.90 (99)	3.47 (88)	4.04 (103)	4.52 (115)	4.43 (113)	4.07 (103)	3.36 (85)	3.41 (87)	3.43 (87)	46.24 (1,176)
Source: The Weather Channel

== Demographics ==
Historical population
Census	Pop.	Note	%±
1860	308		—
1870	214		−30.5%
1880	450		110.3%
1890	590		31.1%
1900	751		27.3%
1910	3,877		416.2%
1920	5,676		46.4%
1930	10,090		77.8%
1940	11,041		9.4%
1950	11,154		1.0%
1960	15,190		36.2%
1970	15,230		0.3%
1980	14,144		−7.1%
1990	15,915		12.5%
2000	19,788		24.3%
2010	26,757		35.2%
2020	27,183		1.6%
2025 (est.)	27,733	▲	2.0%
U.S. Decennial Census

=== 2020 census ===
As of the 2020 census, Thomasville had a population of 27,183. The median age was 39.1 years. 24.0% of residents were under the age of 18 and 16.7% of residents were 65 years of age or older. For every 100 females there were 89.2 males, and for every 100 females age 18 and over there were 85.4 males age 18 and over.

There were 10,890 households and 6,789 families. Of all households, 33.2% had children under the age of 18 living in them, 39.5% were married-couple households, 18.7% were households with a male householder and no spouse or partner present, and 34.1% were households with a female householder and no spouse or partner present. About 29.7% of all households were made up of individuals and 13.1% had someone living alone who was 65 years of age or older.

There were 11,883 housing units, of which 8.4% were vacant. The homeowner vacancy rate was 2.2% and the rental vacancy rate was 6.6%.

99.7% of residents lived in urban areas, while 0.3% lived in rural areas.

Racial composition as of the 2020 census
Race	Number	Percentage
White	16,147	59.4%
Black or African American	5,559	20.5%
American Indian and Alaska Native	218	0.8%
Asian	410	1.5%
Native Hawaiian and Other Pacific Islander	9	0.0%
Some other race	2,704	9.9%
Two or more races	2,136	7.9%
Hispanic or Latino (of any race)	4,537	16.7%

=== 2010 census ===
As of the census of 2010, there were 26,757 people, 10,537 households, and 7,013 families residing in the city. The population density was 1,775.2 inhabitants per square mile (685.4/km^{2}). There were 11,870 housing units at an average density of 763.9 per square mile (294.9/km^{2}). The racial composition of the city was: 68.3% White, 19.6% African American, 14.4% Hispanic or Latino American, 1.1% Asian American, 0.01% Native American, 0% Native Hawaiian or Other Pacific Islander, 8.1% some other race, and 2.1% two or more races.

There were 10,537 households, out of which 32.2% had children under the age of 18 living with them, 42.3% were married couples living together, 18.3% had a female householder with no husband present, and 33.4% were non-families. 28.3% of all households were made up of individuals, and 11.7% had someone living alone who was 65 years of age or older. The average household size was 2.50 and the average family size was 3.05.

In the city, the population was spread out, with 26.5% under the age of 18, 8.6% from 18 to 24, 27.6% from 25 to 44, 23.5% from 45 to 64, and 13.9% who were 65 years of age or older. The median age was 36.2 years. For every 100 females, there were 91.2 males. For every 100 females age 18 and over, there were 86.5 males.

The median income for a household in the city was $34,253, and the median income for a family was $40,795. Males had a median income of $29,794 versus $20,054 for females. The per capita income for the city was $16,045. About 25.2% of families and 29.2% of the population were below the poverty line, including 45.1% of those under age 18 and 17.7% of those age 65 or over.

== Economy ==
Thomasville has been historically associated with furniture and cabinetry manufacture, as well as for a wholesale and retail furniture market. "Thomasville" is used as a trade designation for artisan furniture made by either Thomasville Furniture Industries or furniture companies that are based in the city. Thomasville Furniture Industries was started here in 1904 as a chair company before becoming a furniture manufacturing company in the 1960s. After the last two plants closed in 2014, the Thomasville Furniture Industries Showroom became the only part of the company still located in Thomasville, but it has since closed. The company continues to operate a plant in Lenoir, North Carolina.

Other companies based in Thomasville include flooring company Mohawk Industries, trucker Old Dominion Freight Line and restaurant chain Cook Out.

== Education ==
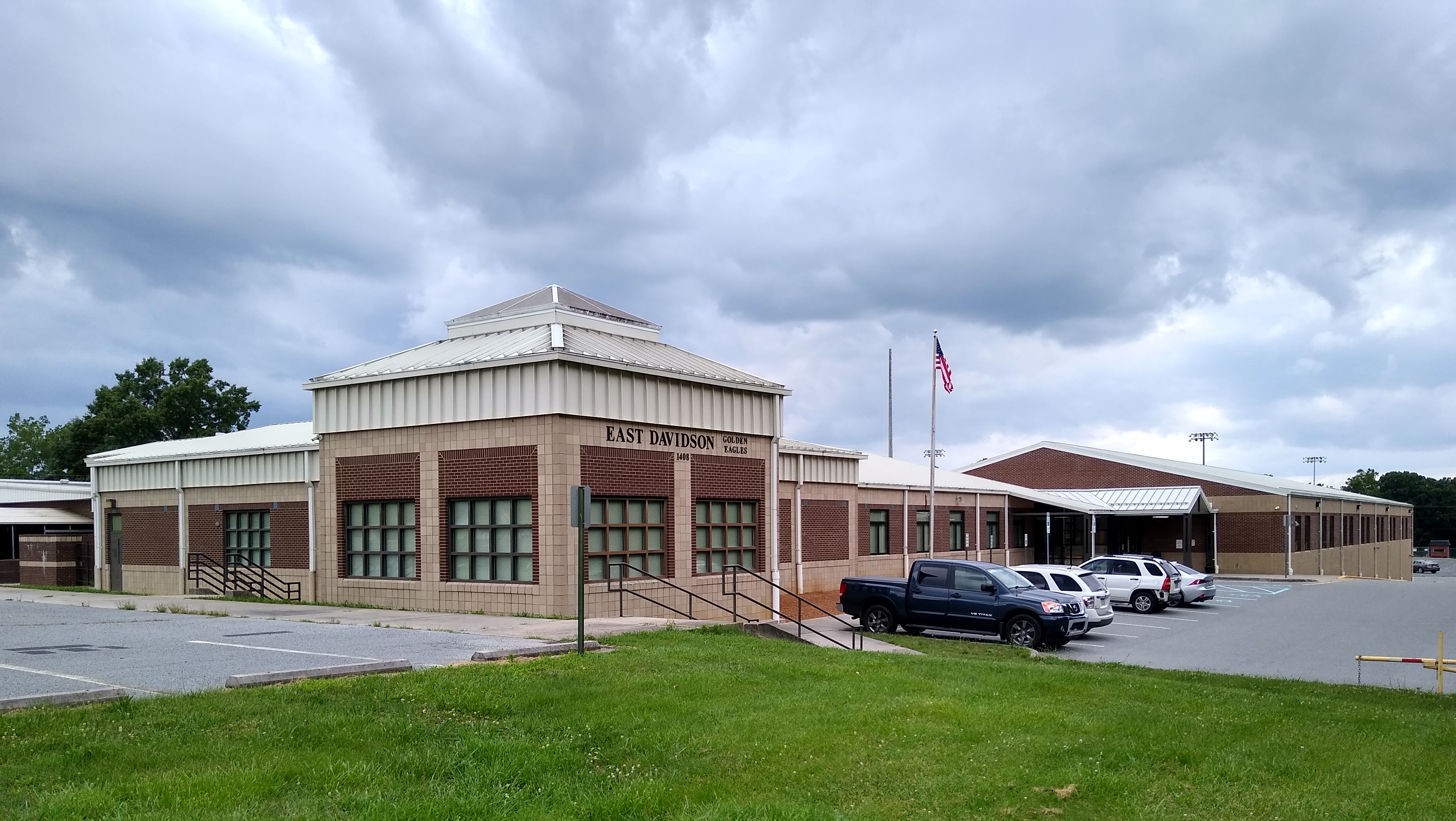
East Davidson High School

The Thomasville City Schools school district covers the central portions of Thomasville. The district consists of four schools: Thomasville Primary (K–3), Liberty Drive Elementary (4–5), Thomasville Middle School (6–8), Thomasville High School (9–12).

Davidson County Schools covers the outskirts portions of the municipality in that county. That district has eight schools in the Thomasville area: Brier Creek Elementary (K–5), Fair Grove Elementary (K–5), Hasty Elementary (K–5), Wallburg Elementary School (K–5), Friendship Elementary School (K–5), Pilot Elementary (K–5), E. Lawson Brown Middle School (6–8), Ledford Middle School (6–8), East Davidson High School (9–12), and Ledford High School (9–12).

The portions in Randolph County are in the Randolph County School System school district.

== Local sports ==
=== Thomasville Senior High Bulldogs ===
Thomasville Senior High School Bulldogs won the state 1AA Football Championship from 2004 to 2006, and again in 2008. Also, the Thomasville Senior High School has a marching band, The Scarlet Regiment. In November 2008 the band traveled to Greensboro, NC where they participated in Asymmetrix Ent. National High Stepping Band Competition. The band placed first in the preliminary round beating over twenty bands from Washington DC all the way to Alabama. Overall in the competition they placed fifth.

The Thomasville Bulldogs are well known throughout the state for excelling in athletics, especially football.

The 1995 Bulldogs were the first team in the history of NC football to go 16–0.

In 2005, The Bulldogs were the first school in the history of NC athletics to win championships in football, women's basketball, and men's basketball and men's soccer in the same year.

==== Championships ====
Award	Years
Football State Champions	1964, 1988, 1991, 1995, 2004, 2005, 2006, 2008
Basketball State Champions (Men's)	1998, 2000, 2003, 2005, 2007
Basketball State Champions (Women's)	2002, 2003, 2004, 2005
Wrestling State Champions	1960, 1961, 1962, 1973, 1991
Soccer State Champions (Men's)	2005

=== High Point-Thomasville HiToms ===
Thomasville is also home to the High Point-Thomasville HiToms of the Coastal Plain League, a collegiate summer baseball league sanctioned by the NCAA. The HiToms won the 2006, 2007 and 2008 Petitt Cup, the Coastal Plain League Championship. The HiToms play at Historic Finch Field in Thomasville, which was built in 1935. From 1937 to 1969, Finch Field was the home to many minor league teams. Hall of Famers such as Eddie Mathews once played for the High Point-Thomasville HiToms of the original Coastal Plain League.

== Media ==
=== Print ===
The Thomasville Times, a bi-weekly community newspaper, covers the city. In addition, three larger daily Triad newspapers cover Thomasville: The Winston-Salem Journal, The High Point Enterprise and The Greensboro News & Record.

== Notable people ==
- Johnny Allen, MLB pitcher
- Chad Barefoot, politician
- Dan Clodfelter, politician, attorney, and former acting mayor of Charlotte, North Carolina
- Frank H. Fleer (1860-1921), confectioner and co-founder of the Fleer Corporation
- Akeem Davis-Gaither, NFL linebacker
- Tom Hall, MLB pitcher
- Mickey Hawks, rockabilly pianist, best known for his song "Bip Bop Boom"
- Brad Hoover, NFL fullback
- Walter Lambeth, U.S. Representative from North Carolina
- W. A. Lambeth, medical professor who was the first athletic director at the University of Virginia
- Victoria Livengood, opera singer
- Norris McDonald, American environmentalist
- Wil Myers, MLB player for the San Diego Padres
- Bolo Perdue, NFL player
- Liston Pope, clergyman
- Larry Thomas, NASCAR driver
- Brian Vickers, NASCAR racer
- Hiram Hamilton Ward, former United States district judge of the United States District Court for the Middle District of North Carolina
- Sam Watford, politician, state senator from Davidson County, former Davidson County Commissioner
- Kariamu Welsh, contemporary dance choreographer, scholar

== See also ==
- Thomasville Public Library
