= List of cemeteries in North Carolina =

This list of cemeteries in the U.S. state of North Carolina includes currently operating, historical (closed for new interments), and defunct (graves abandoned or removed) cemeteries, columbaria, and mausolea which are historical and/or notable. It does not include pet cemeteries.

== Alamance County ==
- Cross Roads Presbyterian Church and Cemetery and Stainback Store near Mebane; NRHP-listed
- Cemetery at Friends Spring Meeting House in Snow Camp; NRHP-listed
- Cemetery at L. Banks Holt House near Alamance; NRHP-listed

== Anson County ==
- Westview Cemetery in Wadesboro; NRHP-listed

== Ashe County ==
- Baptist Chapel Church and Cemetery near Helton; NRHP-listed

== Beaufort County ==
- Trinity Episcopal Church in Chocowinity

== Bladen County ==
- Mt. Horeb Presbyterian Church and Cemetery near Elizabethtown; NRHP-listed

== Brunswick County ==
- St. Philip's Church, Brunswick Town; NRHP-listed

== Buncombe County ==
- Vance Cemetery in Weaverville

== Burke County ==
- Quaker Meadows Cemetery near Morganton; NRHP-listed

== Caldwell County ==
- Dula-Horton Cemetery near Grandin; NRHP-listed
- Cemetery at Mariah's Chapel near Grandin; NRHP-listed

== Carteret County ==
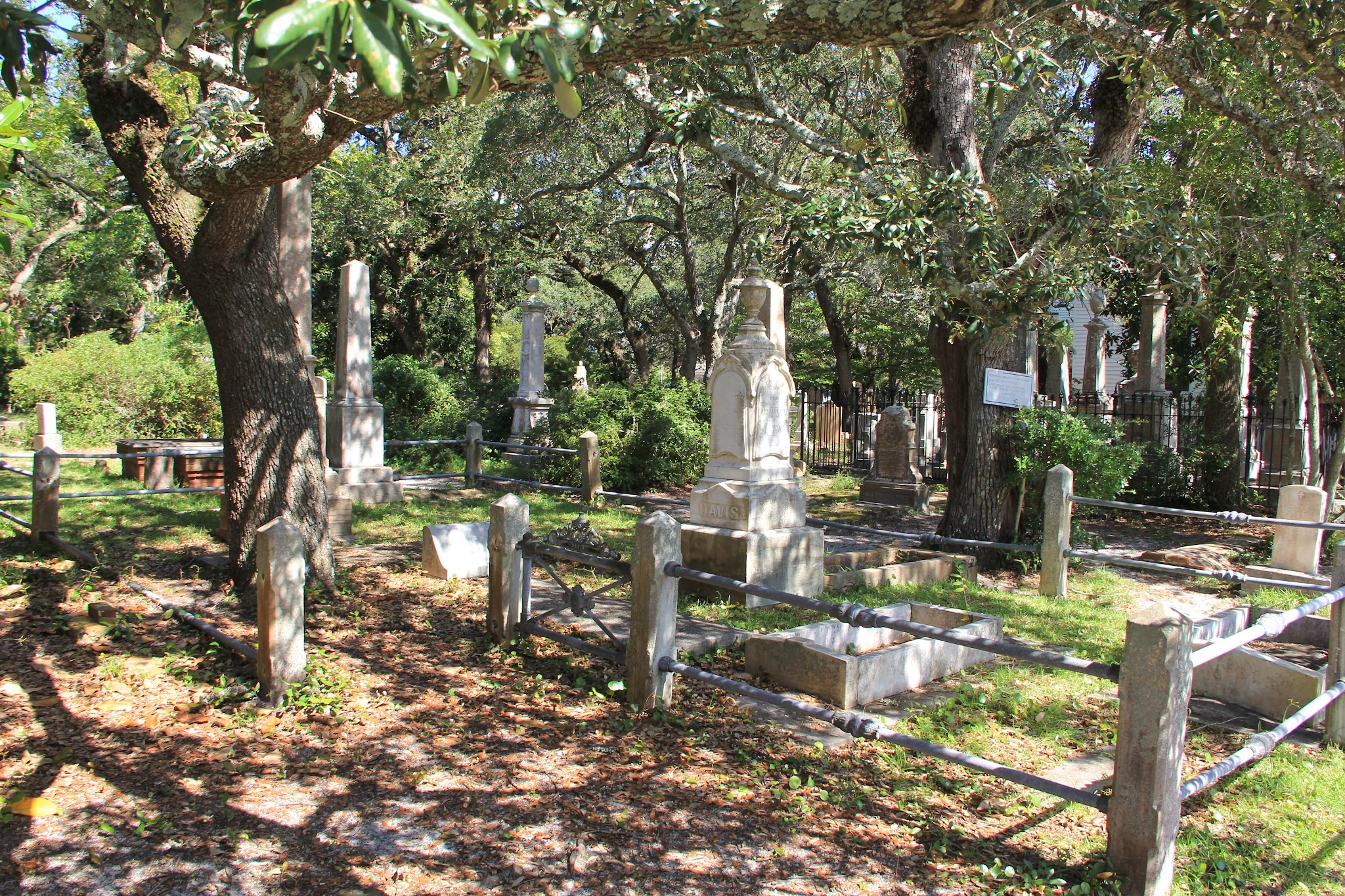
Old Burying Ground in Beaufort, Carteret County

- Old Burying Ground in Beaufort; NRHP-listed

== Caswell County ==
- Griers Presbyterian Church and Cemetery in Frogsboro; NRHP-listed
- Cemetery at Red House Presbyterian Church in Semora; NRHP-listed

== Catawba County ==
- Grace Union Church and Cemetery near Newton; NRHP-listed
- St. Paul's Church and Cemetery in Newton; NRHP-listed

== Cherokee County ==
- Harshaw Chapel and Cemetery in Murphy; NRHP-listed

== Chowan County ==
- St. Paul's Church in Edenton; NRHP-listed

== Cleveland County ==
- Shiloh Presbyterian Church Cemetery near Grover; NRHP-listed

== Columbus County ==
- Mount Moriah Memorial Gardens in Chadbourn

== Craven County ==
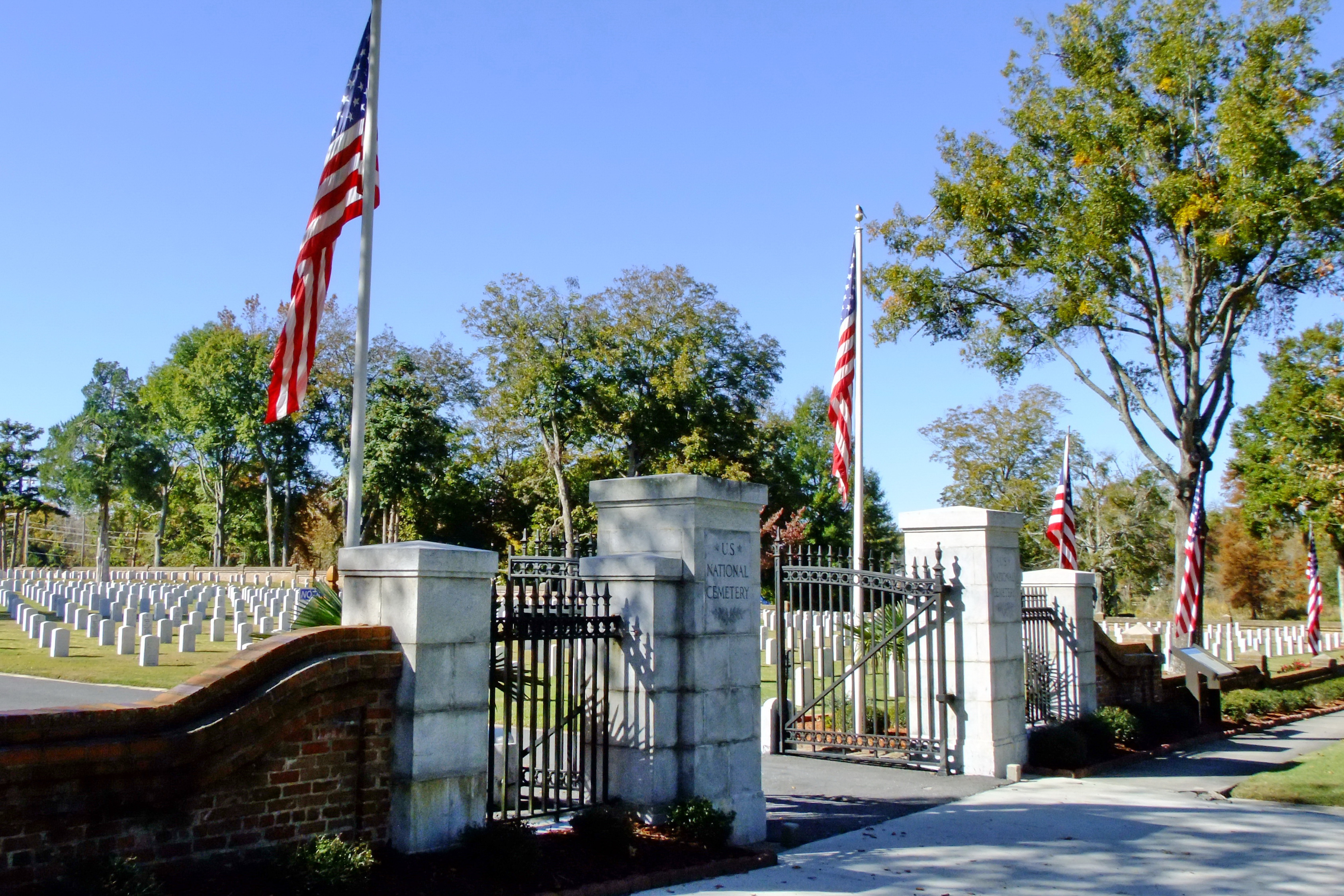
New Bern National Cemetery in New Bern, Craven County

- Cedar Grove Cemetery in New Bern; NRHP-listed
- New Bern National Cemetery in New Bern; NRHP-listed

== Cumberland County ==
- Cross Creek Cemetery in Fayetteville

== Davidson County ==
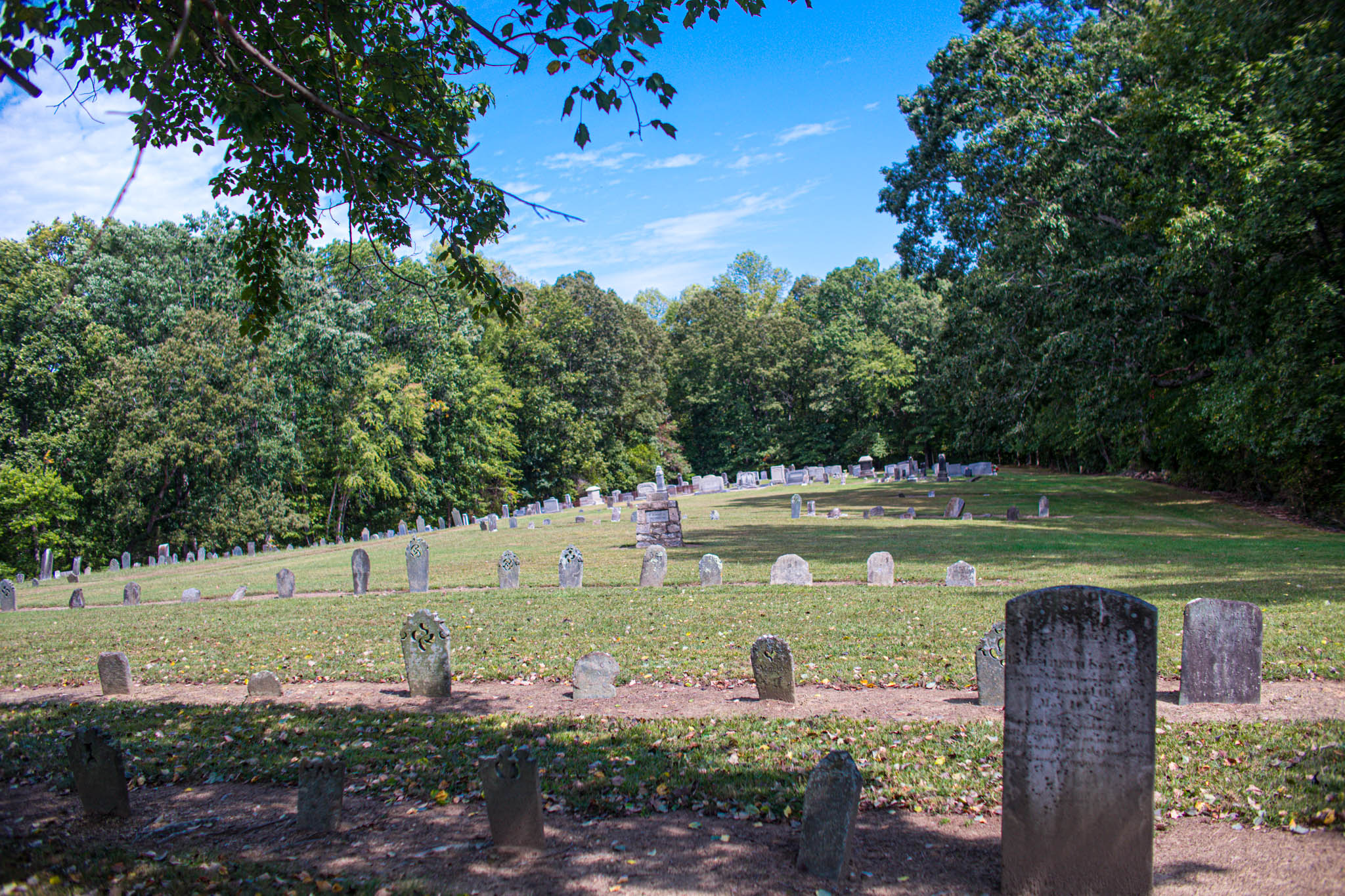
Abbott's Creek Primitive Baptist Church Cemetery in Thomasville, Davidson County

- Abbott's Creek Primitive Baptist Church Cemetery in Thomasville; NRHP-listed
- Beck's Reformed Church Cemetery in Lexington; NRHP-listed
- Bethany Reformed and Lutheran Church Cemetery near Midway; NRHP-listed
- Beulah Church of Christ Cemetery near Welcome; NRHP-listed
- Emanuel United Church of Christ Cemetery near Thomasville; NRHP-listed
- Fair Grove Methodist Church Cemetery in Thomasville; NRHP-listed
- Good Hope Methodist Church Cemetery near Welcome; NRHP-listed
- Jersey Baptist Church Cemetery in Linwood; NRHP-listed
- Pilgrim Reformed Church Cemetery near Lexington; NRHP-listed
- Spring Hill Methodist Protestant Church Cemetery near High Point; NRHP-listed
- St. Luke's Lutheran Church Cemetery near Tyro; NRHP-listed
- Waggoner Graveyard near Welcome; NRHP-listed

== Duplin County ==
- Faison Cemetery in Faison; NRHP-listed

== Durham County ==
- Beechwood Cemetery in Durham
- Geer Cemetery in Durham
- Cemetery at Walnut Hall plantation in Durham

== Edgecombe County ==
- Calvary Episcopal Church and Churchyard in Tarboro; NRHP-listed

== Forsyth County ==
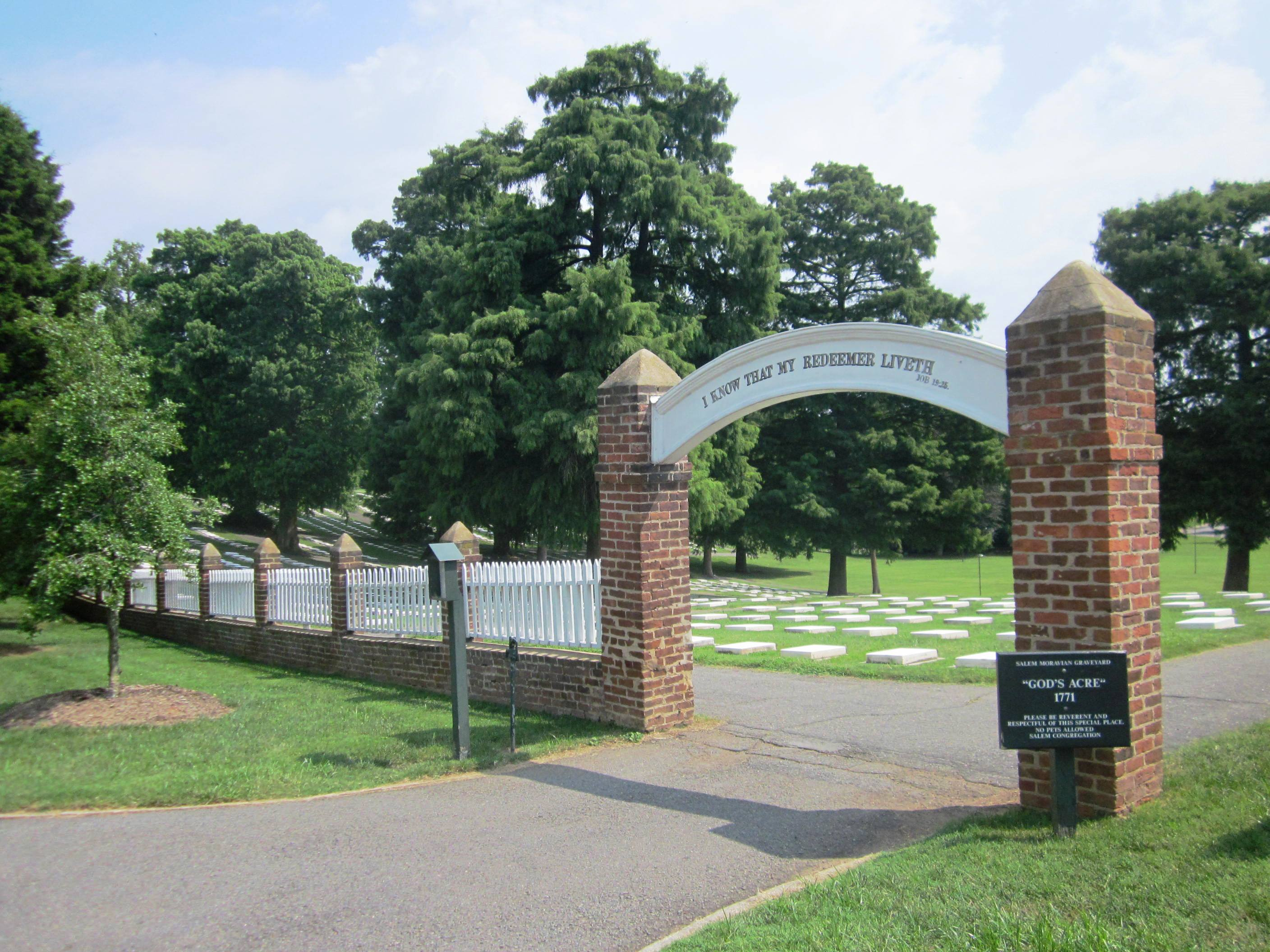
God's Acre Cemetery in Old Salem, Forsyth County

- God's Acre Cemetery in Old Salem in Winston-Salem
- Salem Cemetery in Winston-Salem

== Guilford County ==
- Buffalo Presbyterian Church and Cemetery in Greensboro; NRHP-listed
- Deep River Friends Meeting House and Cemetery in High Point; NRHP-listed
- Green Hill Cemetery in Greensboro
- Tabernacle Methodist Protestant Church and Cemetery in Greensboro; NRHP-listed

== Halifax County ==
- Cemetery at Church of the Immaculate Conception in Halifax

== Harnett County ==
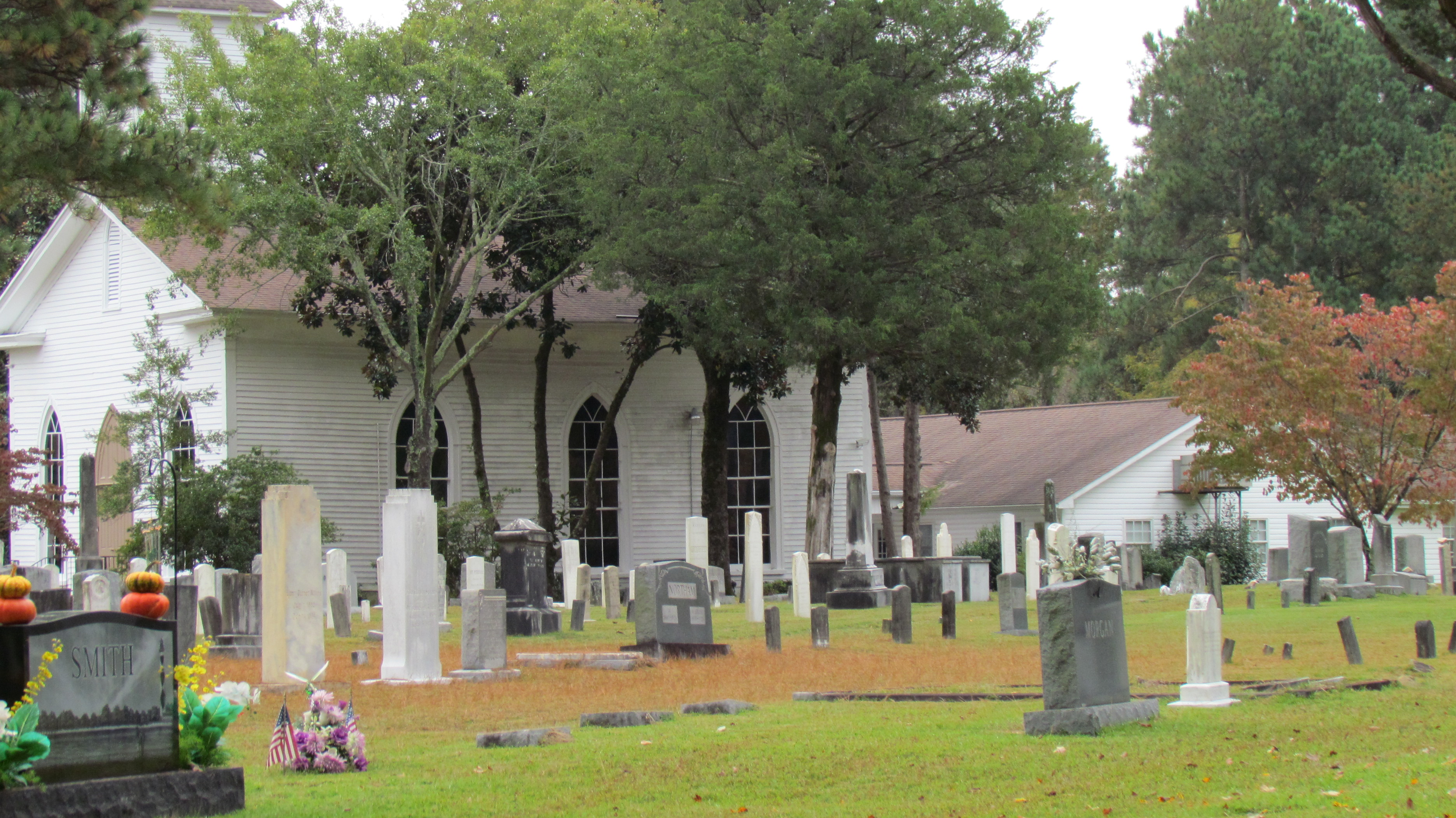
Summerville Presbyterian Church and Cemeterynear Lillington, Harnett County

- Summerville Presbyterian Church and Cemetery near Lillington; NRHP-listed

== Henderson County ==
- St. John in the Wilderness in Flat Rock; NRHP-listed as a contributing property

== Hyde County ==
- George V. Credle House and Cemetery near Rose Bay; NRHP-listed

== Iredell County ==
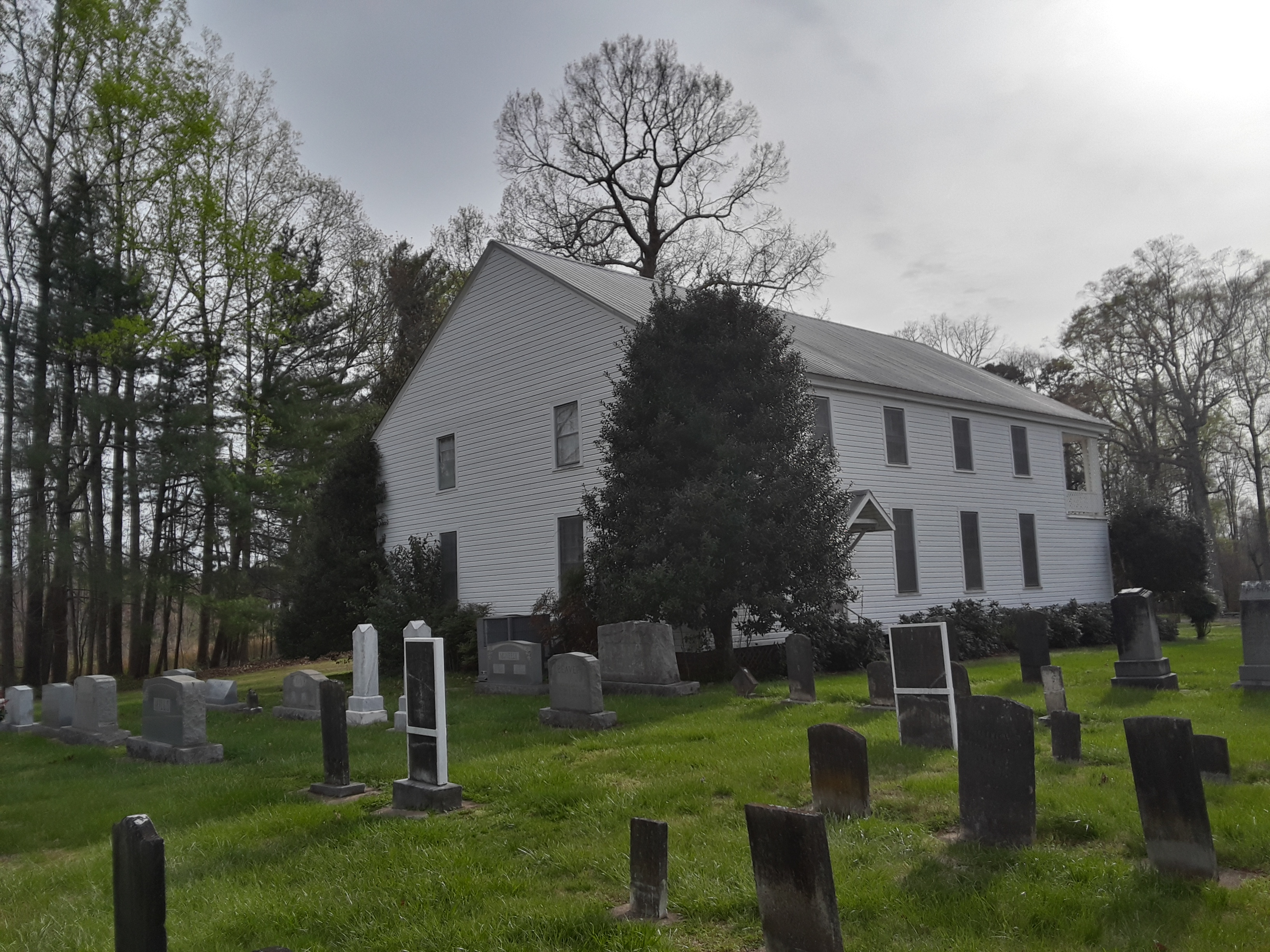
Bethesda Presbyterian Church in Houstonville, Iredell County

- Cemetery at Bethesda Presbyterian Church in Houstonville; NRHP-listed
- Centre Presbyterian Church, Session House and Cemeteries near Mount Mourne; NRHP-listed
- Cemetery at Coddle Creek Associate Reformed Presbyterian Church near Mooresville; NRHP-listed
- Ebenezer Academy, Bethany Presbyterian Church and Cemetery near Statesville; NRHP-listed
- Green Street Cemetery in Statesville
- Snow Creek Methodist Church and Burying Ground near Statesville; NRHP-listed

== Lee County ==
- Buffalo Presbyterian Church and Cemeteries in Sanford; NRHP-listed

== Lincoln County ==
- Methodist Church Cemetery in Lincolnton; NRHP-listed
- Old White Church Cemetery in Lincolnton; NRHP-listed
- St. Luke's Church and Cemetery in Lincolnton; NRHP-listed

== Martin County ==
- Jamesville Primitive Baptist Church and Cemetery in Jamesville; NRHP-listed

== Mecklenburg County ==
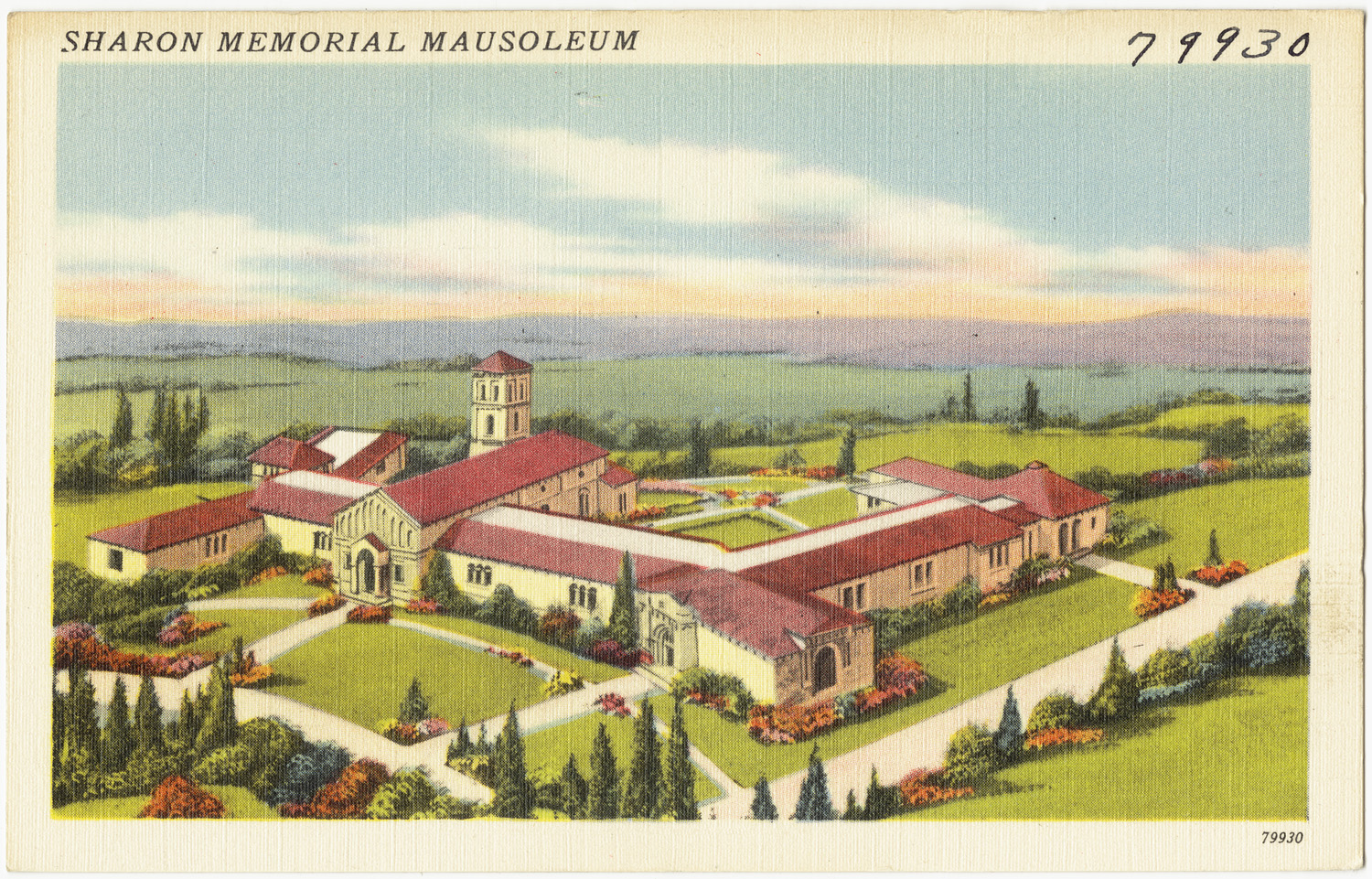
Sharon Memorial Park in Charlotte, Mecklenburg County

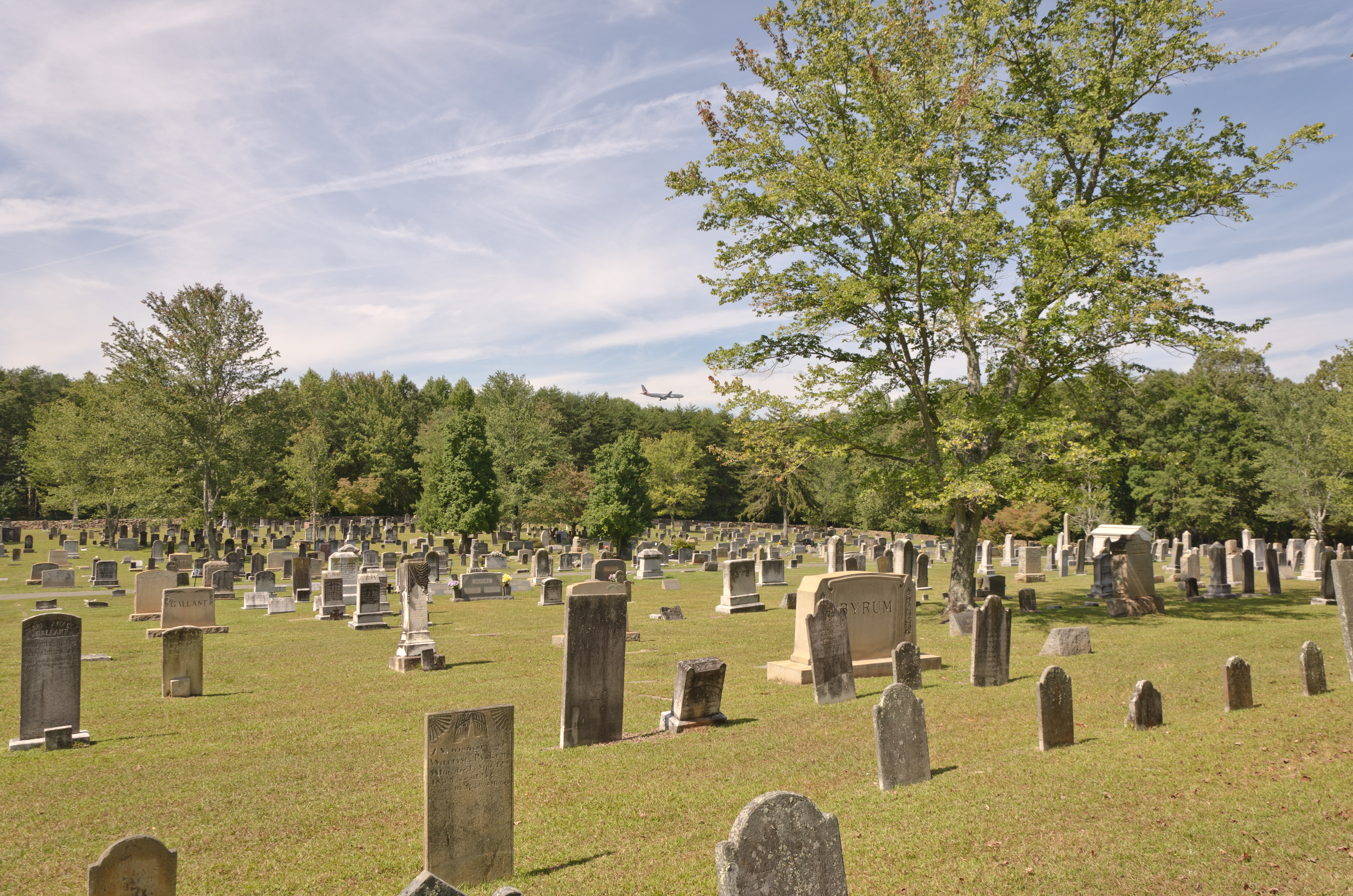
Steele Creek Presbyterian Church and Cemetery near Charlotte, Mecklenburg County

- Hopewell Presbyterian Church and Cemetery near Huntersville; NRHP-listed
- Old Settlers' Cemetery in Charlotte
- Providence Presbyterian Church and Cemetery in Matthews; NRHP-listed
- Ramah Presbyterian Church and Cemetery near Huntersville; NRHP-listed
- Sharon Memorial Park, North Carolina in Charlotte
- Steele Creek Presbyterian Church and Cemetery near Charlotte; NRHP-listed

== New Hanover County ==
- Mount Lebanon Chapel and Cemetery part of Airlie Gardens in Wilmington; NRHP-listed
- Newton Homesite and Cemetery near Carolina Beach; NRHP-listed
- Oakdale Cemetery in Wilmington
- St. James Episcopal Church in Wilmington
- Wilmington National Cemetery in Wilmington; NRHP-listed

== Northampton County ==
- Garysburg United Methodist Church and Cemetery in Garysburg; NRHP-listed

== Orange County ==
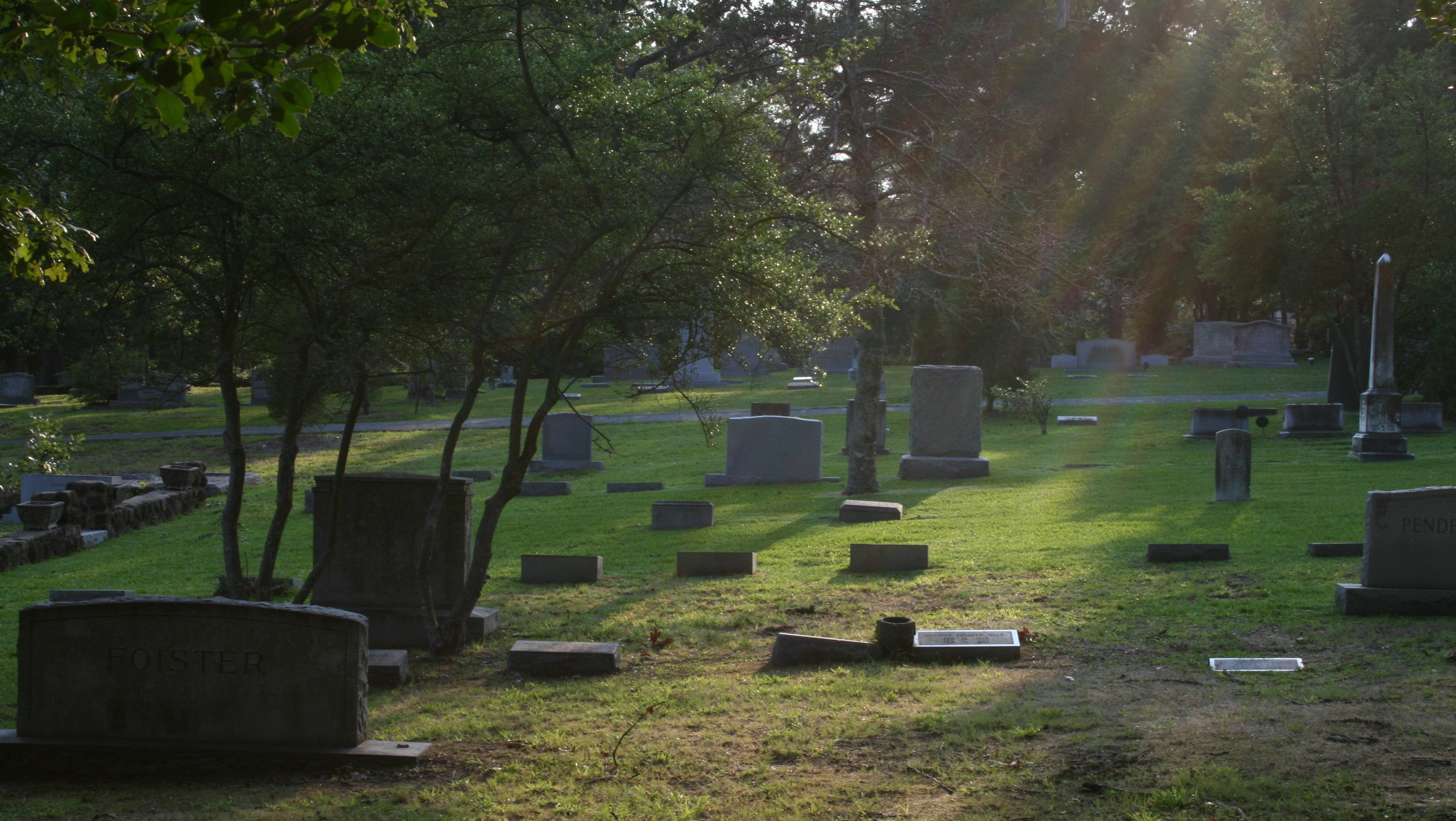
Old Chapel Hill Cemetery (2008), UNC-Chapel Hill, Chapel Hill, Orange County

- Old Chapel Hill Cemetery on the campus of the University of North Carolina at Chapel Hill in Chapel Hill

== Pamlico County ==
- Mesic Community Memorial Cemetery in Vandemere; NRHP-listed

== Pasquotank County ==
- Episcopal Cemetery in Elizabeth City; NRHP-listed

== Pitt County ==
- Red Banks Primitive Baptist Church in Greenville; NRHP-listed

== Stokes County ==
- Germanton Methodist Church and Cemetery in Germanton; NRHP-listed

== Robeson County ==
- Meadowbrook Cemetery in Lumberton; NRHP-listed

== Rockingham County ==
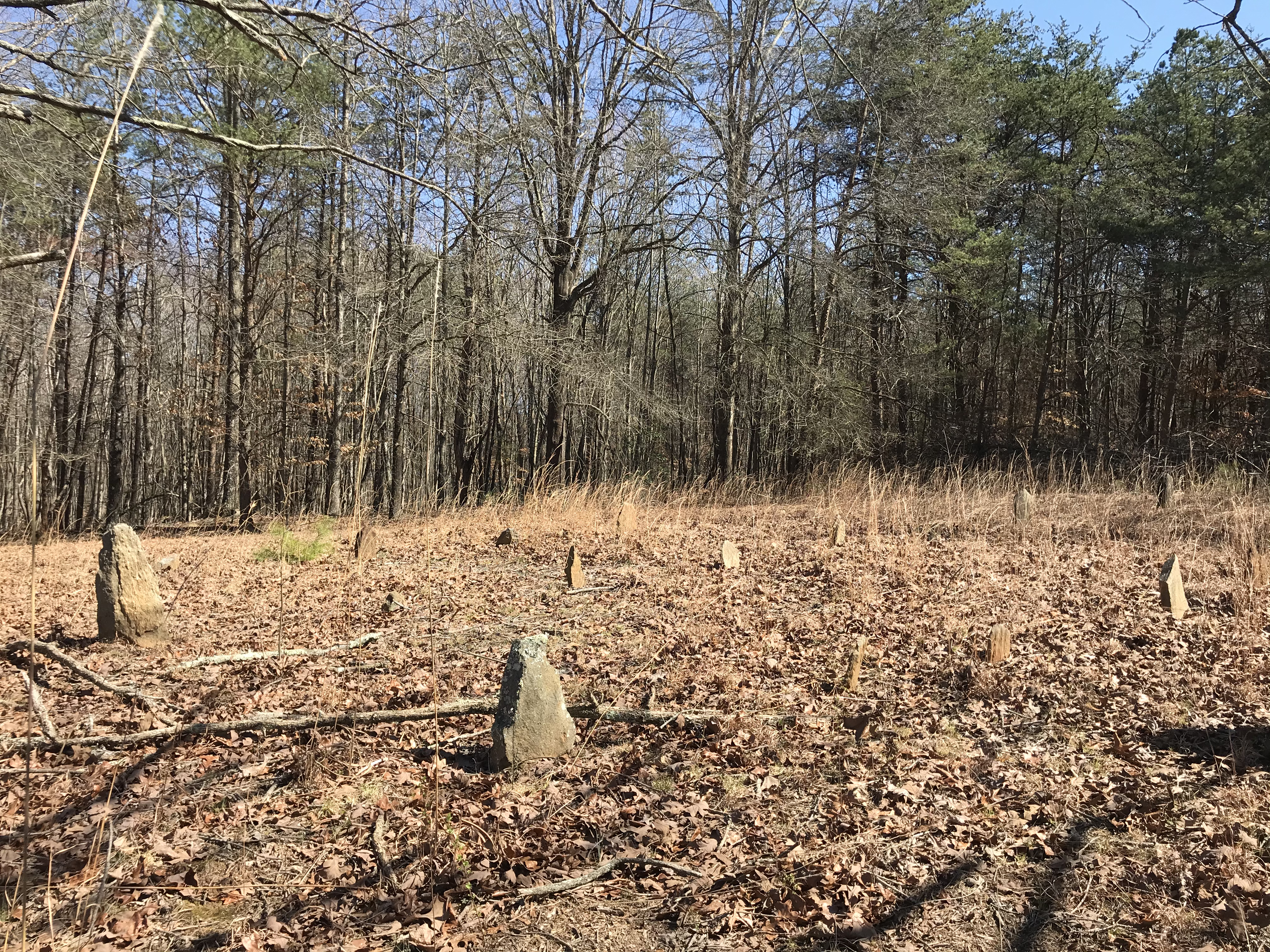
Slave cemetery at Carter Plantation in Wentworth, Rockingham County

- Cemetery at Carter Plantation in Wentworth
- Sardis Primitive Baptist Church in Madison
- Wentworth Methodist Episcopal Church and Cemetery in Wentworth; NRHP-listed

== Rowan County ==
- Back Creek Presbyterian Church and Cemetery in Mount Ulla; NRHP-listed
- Cemetery at Christ Episcopal Church near Cleveland; NRHP-listed
- Green Lawn Cemetery in China Grove
- Salisbury National Cemetery in Salisbury; NRHP-listed
- St. Andrew's Episcopal Church and Cemetery near Woodleaf; NRHP-listed
- Third Creek Presbyterian Church and Cemetery near Cleveland; NRHP-listed
- Thyatira Presbyterian Church, Cemetery, and Manse in Mill Bridge; NRHP-listed

== Wake County ==
- City Cemetery in Raleigh; NRHP-listed
- Dorothea Dix Hospital Cemetery in Raleigh
- Historic Oakwood Cemetery in Raleigh; NRHP-listed as part of Oakwood Historic District
- Raleigh National Cemetery in Raleigh; NRHP-listed

== Wilkes County ==
- St. Paul's Episcopal Church and Cemetery in Wilkesboro; NRHP-listed

== See also ==
- List of cemeteries in the United States
- List of African American cemeteries
- African American cemeteries in North Carolina
