= Greenlawn =

Greenlawn may refer to:

- Greenlawn, Missouri
- Greenlawn, New York
- Greenlawn (Middletown, Delaware), a historic house
- Greenlawn (Amite City, Louisiana), a historic mansion
- Greenlawn Ltd., a Canadian lawn services company that does business as TruGreen

== See also ==
- Greenlawn Cemetery (disambiguation)
- Trinity School at Greenlawn, South Bend, Indiana
