= William Berenberg =

American physician

William Berenberg, M.D. (October 29, 1915 – September 14, 2005) was an American physician, Harvard professor, and pioneer in the treatment and rehabilitation of cerebral palsy.

== Early life ==
Berenberg was born in Haverhill, Massachusetts, to immigrant parents. Growing up in Chelsea, Massachusetts, he proved a bright and studious young man and earned admission to Harvard University on scholarship. However, his father was reportedly too proud to allow his son to take the "hand-out" and Berenberg worked his own way through the Ivy League institution, commuting from home and cleaning dishes for extra income. He graduated from Harvard cum laude in 1936 and entered Boston University Medical School later that year, earning his M.D. in 1940. In 1941, Berenberg entered the pathology department of Children's Hospital in Boston as an intern. Thus began his extraordinary sixty-year relationship with the hospital.

== Career ==
He was Chief, Interim Chief or Associate Chief of seven divisions, including serving as Associate Physician-in-Chief from 1969 to 1974, and Chief of the Cerebral Palsy Division for 44 years. He was a worldwide leader in the study and treatment of cerebral palsy and opened the first cerebral palsy kindergarten in Wellesley, Massachusetts. In 1968, he was elected president of the American Academy of Cerebral Palsy. Along with friend and fellow cerebral palsy advocate Leonard Goldenson, Berenberg appeared before the U.S. House Appropriations Committee in 1973. He successfully lobbied for the Rehabilitation Act, which was arguably the first piece of landmark legislation enacted to protect the disabled, outlawing discrimination based on handicap. In it, public funding was secured for orthopedic equipment. Berenberg became an adjunct professor at MIT and, from 1974–1988, directed the Harvard – MIT Rehabilitation Engineering Center, where he coordinated research to create devices to help those with disabilities.

A Professor of Pediatrics at Harvard Medical School, Berenberg trained over 1,000 pediatricians and treated many thousands of children, including President John F. Kennedy's late son Patrick. Housecalls in eastern Massachusetts were common, but he also built a large international practice, with patients from Mexico to Saudi Arabia. Berenberg was the official medical consultant to the U.S. Virgin Islands.

== Recognition ==
Berenberg received numerous honors and awards during his long career. Early on, he was lauded by President Franklin D. Roosevelt for his research in gamma globulin. In 1970, the President of Ecuador awarded him the National Order of Merit with the grade of commander for service to that nation's children. In 1980, he was awarded the Janeway Award for Excellence in Clinical Teaching from the house staff. In 1990, Berenberg received a distinct honor when many of his colleagues, supporters, and former patients raised funds to endow the William Berenberg Professorship of Pediatrics at Harvard Medical School. Frederick Lovejoy was the first to hold the chair.

Formally retiring in 2001, Berenberg remained a Harvard professor emeritus until his death on September 14, 2005 in Norwood, Massachusetts. He is buried at Sharon Memorial Park in Sharon, Massachusetts. Berenberg married Blanche Berger (dec. 1989) in 1939 and the couple had three children. Two became physicians, Jeffrey L. Berenberg and Richard A. Berenberg (dec. 1984), and one became a social worker, Barbara Berenberg.
