= African American cemeteries in North Carolina =

African American cemeteries in North Carolina were established throughout the state's history. While many are in decay, interest in preserving, restoring, and commemorating their history has developed.

The South Ashville Cemetery in Asheville, North Carolina, is the oldest public cemetery for African Americans in Western North Carolina. It founded as a cemetery for enslaved people and has been gradually restored by community volunteers. The Odd Fellow Cemetery in Wilson, North Carolina was established by the fraternal organization and is now commemorated with an historic marker.

Some of North Carolina's African American cemeteries are abandoned and endangered. In Johnston County, enslaved people were buried in what is now a woodsy area, some of their graves marked with fieldstones. The cemetery continued in use after the Civil War and emancipation, and the property was purchased by a former slave.

The following is a list of known African American cemeteries in North Carolina.

== List ==
Cemetery	Established	Still active	Location	Photo	Historic designation	References
Alexander Slave Cemetery			Charlotte			
Allen’s Temple AME Church	1895	no	Asheboro			
Antioch Missionary Baptist Church Cemetery	1907	no	Charlotte		Mecklenburg County Historic Landmark	
Ayden African American Cemetery	c. 1908	no	Ayden			
Barbee-Hargraves Cemetery	1790	no	Chapel Hill			
Beaver Dam Enslaved Cemetery	1800s	no	Davidson			
Beechwood Cemetery	c. 1924	yes	Durham			
Bethesda Methodist Church		no	Huntersville			
Biddleville Cemetery	c, 1873	no	Charlotte		Mecklenburg County Historic Landmark	
Black Bottom Memorial Cemetery	1907	no	Belhaven			
Brindle-Phelps / Wesley Chapel Cemetery	1887	no	Davidson County			
Buncombe Baptist Churchyard	1872	no	Petersville, Davidson County			
Carter Plantation Cemetery		yes	Wentworth			
Cary First Christian Church Cemetery	1868	no	Cary		Cary Historic Landmark	
Cedar Grove Cemetery	1915	no	Charlotte			
Chestnut Grove United Methodist Church Cemetery	1909	no	Reedy Creek Township, Davidson County			
China Grove Baptist Churchyard			Cumberland County			
Dark Branch Community Cemetery	late 19th century	no	Dark Branch, Brunswick County			
Dinkins Cemetery	1798	no	Charlotte			
Evans Cemetery			Lexington			
Ferree's Chapel Cemetery	early 1900s	no	Randleman			
First Baptist Church Cemetery	c. 1912	no	Cotton Grove Township, Davidson County			
Flea Hill Church			Cumberland County			
Flemington Community Cemetery			New Hanover County			
Freeman Community Graveyard			Bolton			
Fritts Cemetery	1800s	no	Lexington			
Geer Cemetery	1877	no	Durham		National Register of Historic Places	
Haden Grove AME Zion Methodist Church Cemetery	1879		Lexington			
Hank's Chapel AME Churchyard			New Hanover County			
Hart-Rice or Second Site Cemetery	1797	no	Mecklenburg County			
Herron-McKnight-Brown Cemetery		No	Steele Creek			
Hill Graveyard			Wilmington			
Hillcrest Cemetery	1920	no	Raleigh			
Historic Unity Cemetery	1901	no	Rocky Mount			
Holt Plantation Graveyard	1800s	no	Linwood			
John N. Smith Cemetery	1880	no	Southport		National Register of Historic Places	
KellyMcLaurin Graveyard			Cumberland County			
Kinnamon Cemetery		No	Huntersville			
Little Davy Cemetery	1889	no	Little Davie, Trinity			
Mabry Cemetery	1905	no	Lexington			
Maides Cemetery	late 19th century	no	Maides Park, Wilmington			
Mallard Creek Presbyterian Church Enslaved Cemetery		no	Charlotte			
McCoy Slave Cemetery		no	Huntersville			
Mount Hope Cemetery	1872	no	Raleigh		National Register of Historic Places	
Neely Slave Cemetery	c. late 1700s	no	Charlotte		Mecklenburg County Historic Landmark	
New Hope Cemetery	c. 1885	no	Franklin			
New Jersey AME Zion Church Cemetery	1888		Lexington			
Oakdale Cemetery	1885	yes	Hendersonville		National Register of Historic Places	
Oakwood Cemetery "Colored Section"		no	Highpoint			
Oberlin Cemetery	1873	no	Raleigh		National Register of Historic Places	
Odd Fellows Cemetery	1911		Forsyth County		Forsyth County Local Historic Landmark	
Odd Fellows Cemetery	1811	no	Wilson			
Old Smith Grove Baptist Churchyard			Davidson County			
Pilgrim Reformed African American Cemetery	1885	no	Lexington			
Pinewood Cemetery	1853	yes	Charlotte		Mecklenburg County Historic Landmark	
Prosperity Presbyterian Church Enslaved Cemetery		no	Charlotte			
Raleigh Road - Lexington City Cemetery		no	Lexington			
Roseland Cemetery	c. 1865	no	Charlotte		Mecklenburg County Historic Landmark	
Roundtree Cemetery		no	Wilson			
St. Lloyd Presbyterian Cemetery #1	1868	no	South Park, Charlotte		Mecklenburg County Historic Landmark	
St. Lloyd Presbyterian Cemetery #2	1926	no	Grier Heights, Charlotte			
Sardis Presbyterian Church		no	Charlotte			
Smith Cemetery		no	Silver Hill Township, Davidson County			
Show Hill AME Zion Churchyard			Cumberland County			
Snow Hill Primitive Baptist Cemetery	1929		Mebane			
South Asheville Cemetery	1800s	no	Asheville			
South Lexington Cemetery	1950s	no	Lexington			
Strieby Congregational United Church of Christ Cemetery	1880	yes	Asheboro		Randolph County Cultural Heritage Site	
Swans Creek Baptist Church			Cumberland County			
Taylor Black Cemetery	1893	no	Goldsboro			
Union Cemetery	1882	no	Greensboro		National Register of Historic Places	
Vick Cemetery		no	Wilson			
Violet Hills Cemetery	1932	yes	Asheville			
Waggoner Graveyard			Lexington			
West Chapel Hill Cemetery	1949	no	Chapel Hill			
Wilkins Cemetery		no	Dunn			
Willis Creek Church			Cumberland County			
Woodlawn Cemetery	c. 1928		Southern Pines		NC Historic Black Cemetery Registry	
Zion Chapel Cemetery			Hiddenite			

== See also ==
- List of African American cemeteries
