= Greenlawn Cemetery =

Greenlawn Cemetery may refer to:

- Green Lawn Cemetery (Columbus, Ohio)
- Greenlawn Cemetery (Nahant, Massachusetts)
- Green Lawn Cemetery (China Grove, North Carolina)
- Greenlawn Cemetery (Indianapolis, Indiana)
- Greenlawn Cemetery (Portsmouth, Ohio)

== Greenlawn Memorial Park ==
- Greenlawn Memorial Park (Colma, California)
- Greenlawn Memorial Park (Newport News, Virginia)
