= Greenlawn (Middletown, Delaware) =

Former historic house in Delaware, US

- U.S. National Register of Historic Places
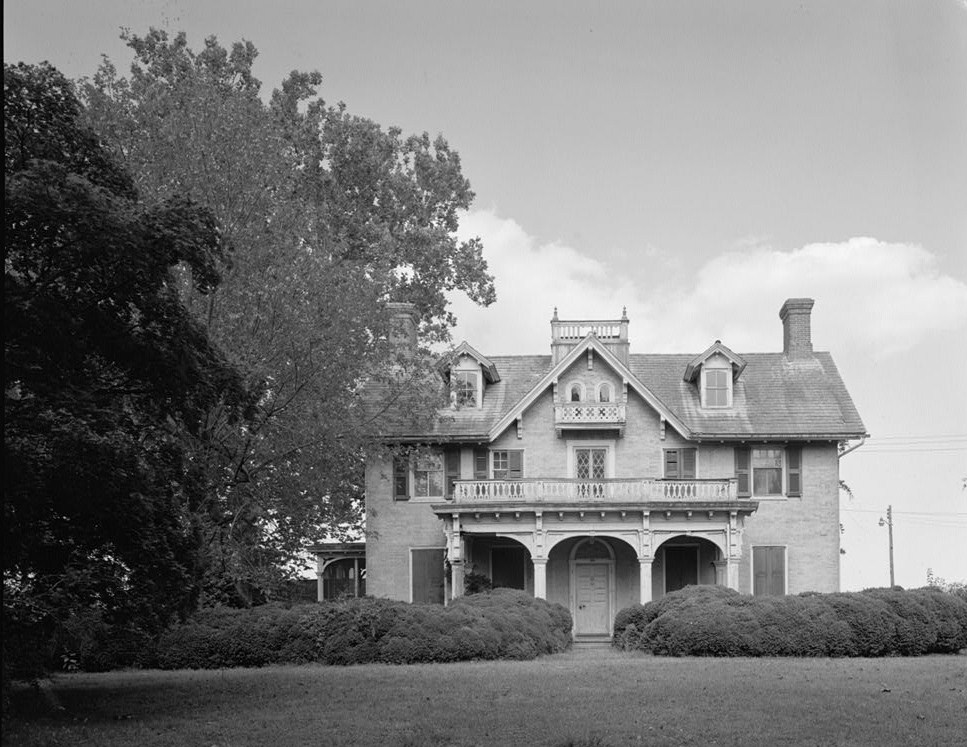
- Greenlawn, HABS Photo, August 1983

- Location within Delaware Location within the United States
- Location: 671 N. Broad St., Middletown, Delaware
- Coordinates: 39°27′26″N 75°43′7″W
- Area: 5 acres (2.0 ha)
- Built: c. 1810, c. 1860
- Architectural style: Early Republic, Late Victorian, Late Georgian
- NRHP reference No.: 73000515
- Added to NRHP: April 24, 1973

Greenlawn, also known as the Outten Davis House and William Brady House, was a historic home located at Middletown in New Castle County, Delaware, United States. It was built about 1810, and radically altered about 1860. It was a two-story, five-bay, brick dwelling with cross-gable roof with dormers. It had a rear brick ell with attached wing. It featured a three-bay front porch, large brackets, a widow's walk on the roof, and ornate chimney caps. It was originally built in the Late Georgian style, then modified with Late Victorian details.

It was listed on the National Register of Historic Places in 1973 and demolished in about 1985.
