= Fair Grove Methodist Church Cemetery =

Historic cemetery in North Carolina, United States

- U.S. National Register of Historic Places
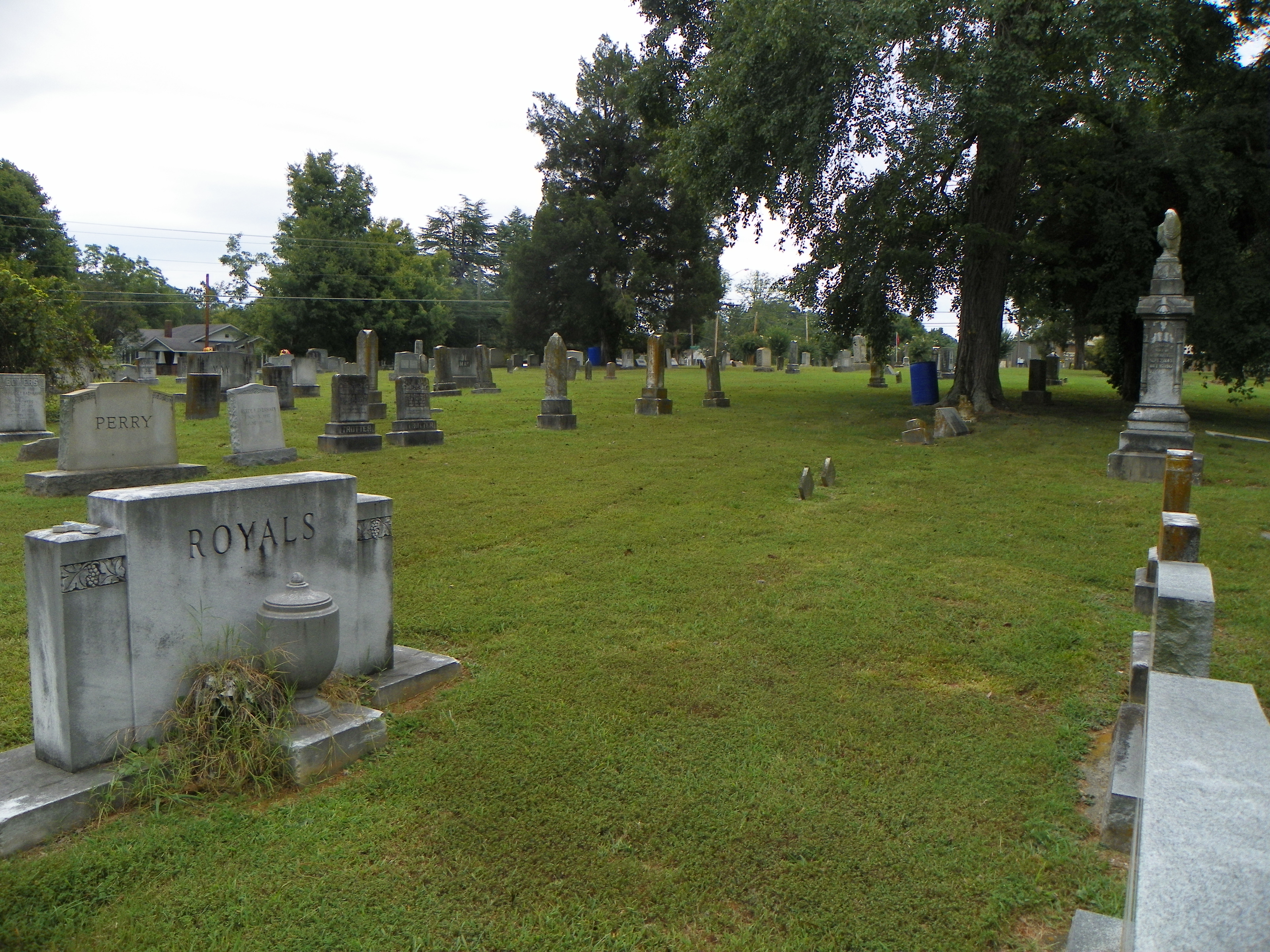

- Location within North Carolina Location within the United States
- Location: Jct. of SR 2072 and 2070 and old NC 109, Thomasville, North Carolina
- Coordinates: 35°51′5″N 80°4′42″W
- Area: 2.5 acres (1.0 ha)
- MPS: Anglo-German Cemeteries TR
- NRHP reference No.: 84002004
- Added to NRHP: July 10, 1984

Fair Grove Methodist Church Cemetery is a historic church cemetery associated with the Fair Grove Methodist Church at Thomasville, Davidson County, North Carolina. It contains approximately 400 gravestones, with the earliest gravestone dated to 1829. It features a unique collection of folk gravestones by local stonecutters erected in Davidson County in the late-18th and first half of the 19th centuries.

It was listed on the National Register of Historic Places in 1984.

== Gallery ==
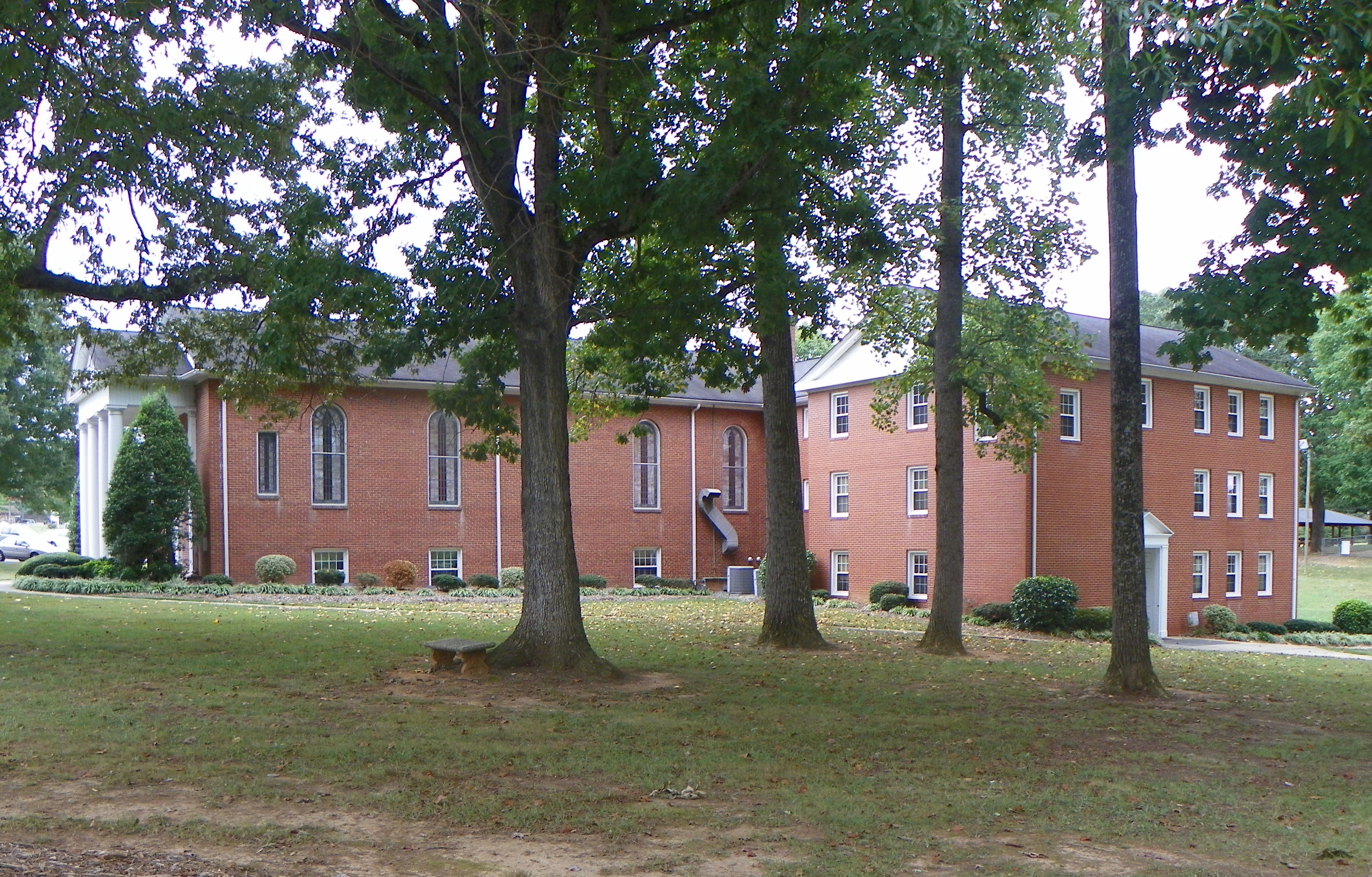
The associated church
