= Union Cemetery (Greensboro, North Carolina) =

Historic cemetery in North Carolina, United States

- U.S. National Register of Historic Places
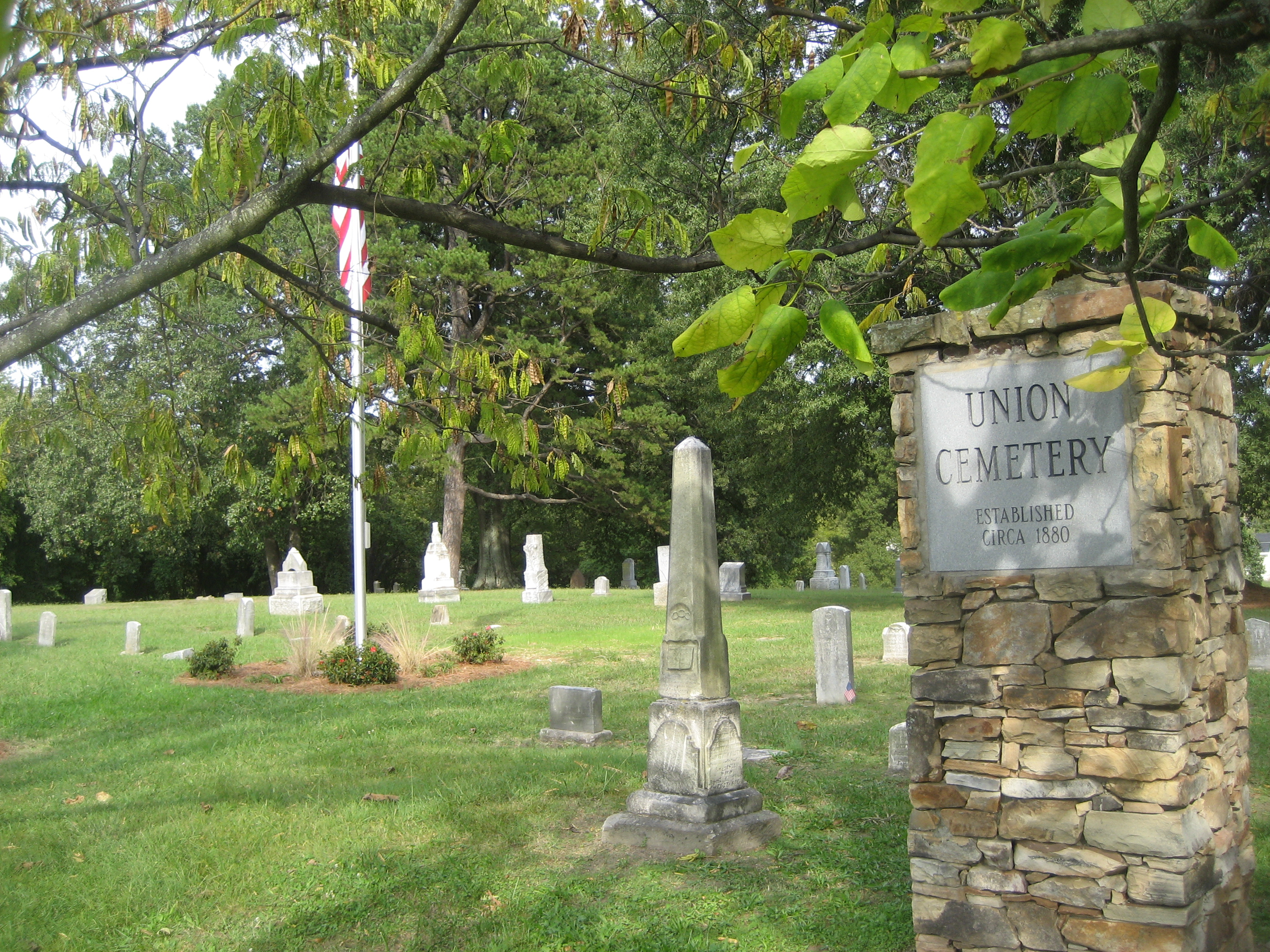
- Union Cemetery, September 2012

- Location within North Carolina Location within the United States
- Location: 900 blook S. Elm St., Greensboro, North Carolina
- Coordinates: 36°3′31″N 79°47′29″W
- Area: 4 acres (1.6 ha)
- Built: 1882
- MPS: Greensboro MPS
- NRHP reference No.: 93001142
- Added to NRHP: October 21, 1993

Union Cemetery, also known as South Elm Street Cemetery, is a historic cemetery located at Greensboro, Guilford County, North Carolina. The cemetery for African-Americans was established in 1882. Union retains 97 gravemarkers with death dates from 1882 to 1940. The majority of the markers date between 1901 and 1917, when the city of Greensboro closed the cemetery.

It was listed on the National Register of Historic Places in 1993.
