= Providence Presbyterian Church and Cemetery =

Historic site in Mecklenburg County, North Carolina, US

- Providence Presbyterian Church and Cemetery - Established 1767
- U.S. National Register of Historic Places
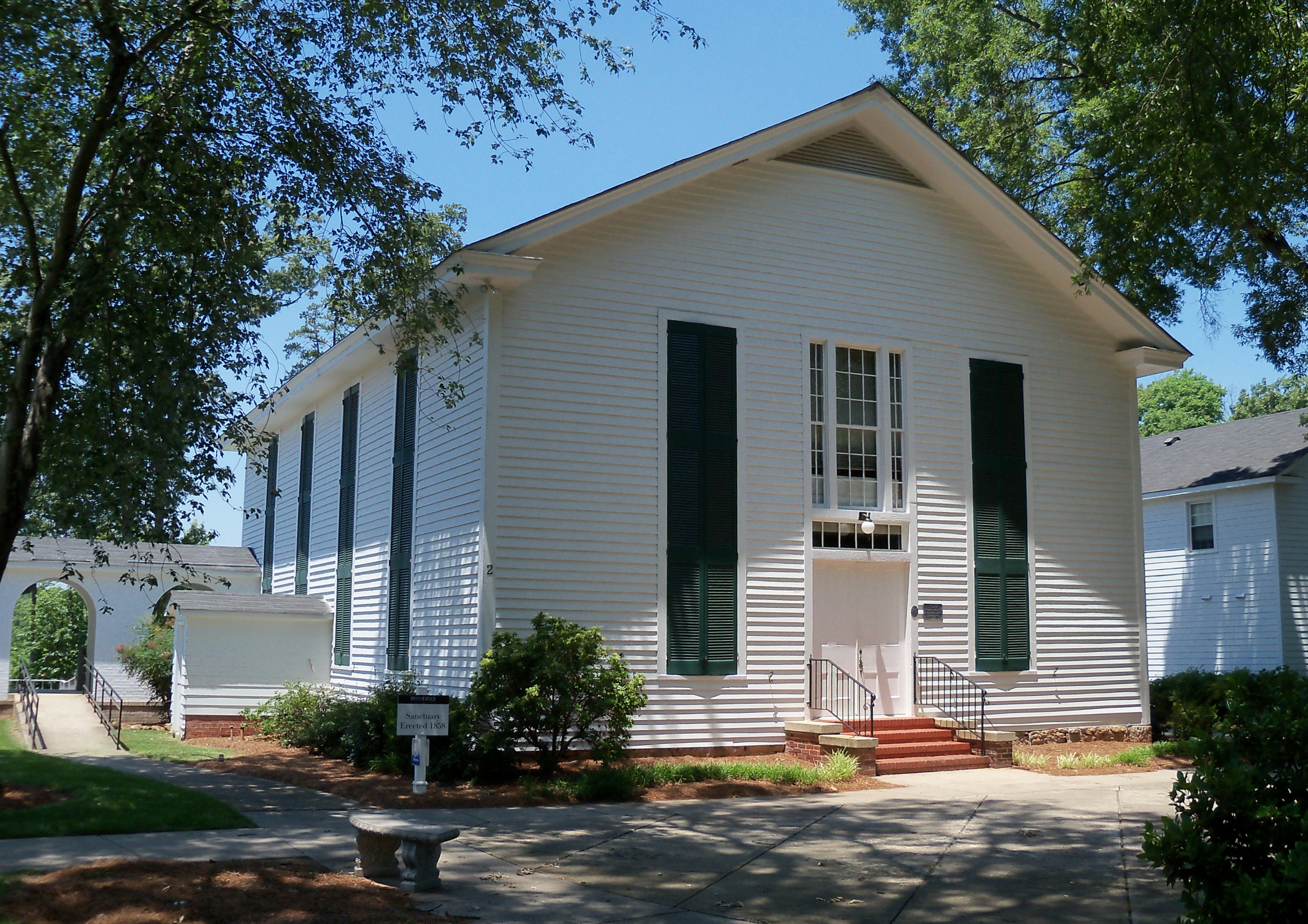
- Providence Presbyterian Church, July 2011

- Location within North Carolina Location within the United States
- Location: 10140 Providence w Lane., Charlotte, North Carolina
- Coordinates: 35°4′11″N 80°46′18″W
- Area: 23.5 acres (9.5 ha)
- Built: 1858
- Architectural style: Greek Revival
- NRHP reference No.: 82003487
- Added to NRHP: June 1, 1982

Providence Presbyterian Church and Cemetery (PPC) is a historic Presbyterian church and cemetery located at 10140 Providence Road in Matthews, Mecklenburg County, North Carolina. The church was built in 1858, and is a rectangular, gable-front Greek Revival style frame building. It is three bays wide and four bays deep on a low stone foundation and features extraordinarily tall window openings on all four sides. Adjacent to the church is the contributing church cemetery, with the oldest grave marker dated 1764. Providence Presbyterian Church, the oldest intact and only antebellum frame church in Mecklenburg County.

It was added to the National Register of Historic Places in 1982.

Providence Presbyterian Church was founded by a large group of Ulster Scots who came to the American ‘promised land’ in the 1700s. This group of people were drawn to the area by their faith and the idea of a new frontier. Ulster Scots migrated south, took part in the Revolutionary and Civil Wars and established deep roots in Mecklenburg County. Providence Road – one of Charlotte’s main thoroughfares – takes its name from this prominent church while other roads, such as Rea Road and McKee Road, are named for members of the PPC congregation.

‘Providence’ expresses the founders’ firm trust in the faithfulness of God to work all things for God’s purpose, which is a bedrock tenant of their Presbyterian faith. One of the original seven colonial Presbyterian churches in the county, PPC served as the center of the Providence Community. Though that community has grown exponentially over the years as Charlotte has become more and more populated, the same could also be said of the church today: it still sits at the center of many of the community member’s lives.

Starting with their first minister Rev. William Richardson 1767, to the present's Senior Pastor Walt McCanless, Providence Presbyterian Church has had a lot of servant leaders. Many grew and/or attempted to grow the congregation from one generation to the next—through difficult times and prosperous times. Among those were enslaved communicants who, though denied full membership to the church, contributed to it during the time prior to the Emancipation Proclamation. They were instrumental in building the “new” sanctuary of 1858. This is the historic building where they continue to meet for worship today.

They welcome members and visitors alike to share in worship and connect to God’s people and purpose. The Providence first ‘pulpit,’ also known as Preaching Rock is at the entrance to the cemetery, where markers pre date the Revolutionary War. As one continues through the back gate, folks can visit the enslaved cemetery. This path leads to the nearby spring that first drew worshipers to this spot and provided water for baptisms, as well as drinking water for people and their horses.

History is too valuable a teacher to be forgotten. Providence Presbyterian Church seeks to learn and grow from the lived faith of Providence’s fathers and mothers. And where their lived experiences were less than consistent with the gospel, reflecting instead their cultural milieu, they seek forgiveness and reconciliation.
