= Grace Union Church and Cemetery =

Historic district in North Carolina, United States

- U.S. National Register of Historic Places
- U.S. Historic district
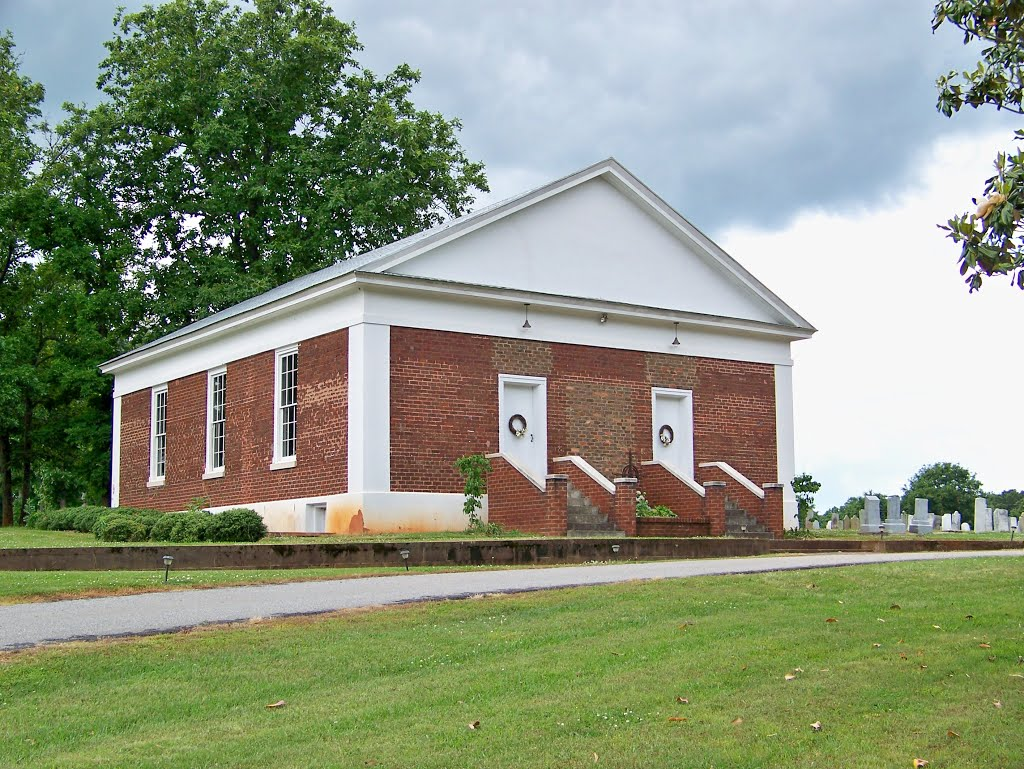

- Location within North Carolina Location within the United States
- Location: Junction of SR 1008 and SR 2030, near Newton, North Carolina
- Coordinates: 35°35′56″N 81°19′2″W
- Area: 3.1 acres (1.3 ha)
- Built: 1857
- Architect: Irby, Joseph
- Architectural style: Greek Revival
- MPS: Catawba County MPS
- NRHP reference No.: 90000739
- Added to NRHP: May 10, 1990

Grace Union Church and Cemetery is a historic church and national historic district located near Newton, Catawba County, North Carolina. It was built in 1857, and is a one-story, brick, Greek Revival-style church. Also on the property is the Grace Union Cemetery, with gravestones dated as early as 1822.

It was added to the National Register of Historic Places in 1990.
