= Griers Presbyterian Church and Cemetery =

Historic church in North Carolina, United States

- U.S. National Register of Historic Places
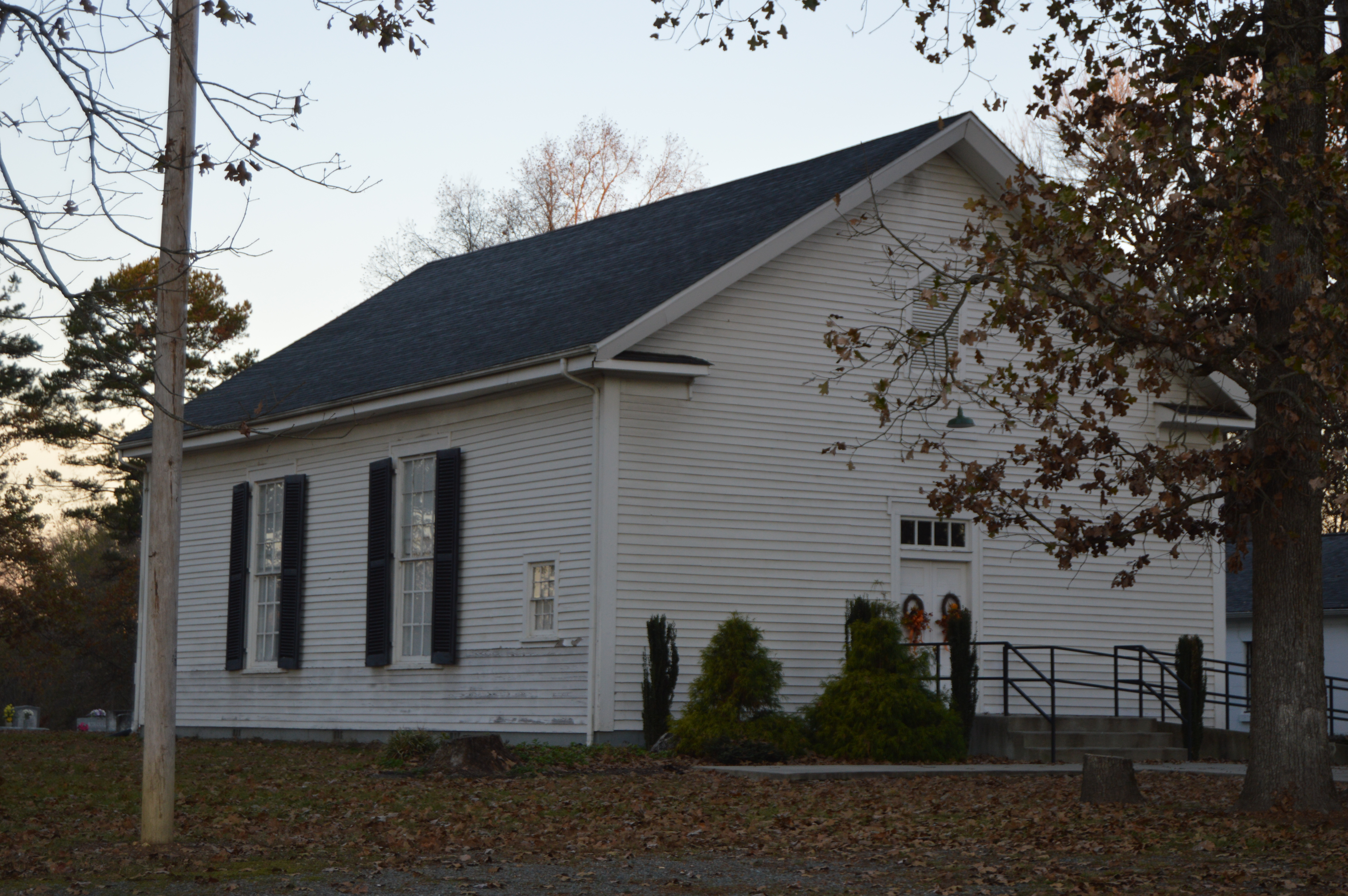
- Front and southern side

- Location within North Carolina Location within the United States
- Location: SR 1710, near Frogsboro, North Carolina
- Coordinates: 36°20′50″N 79°13′10″W
- Area: 2 acres (0.81 ha)
- Built: c. 1856
- Architect: Alfred A. Mitchell
- Architectural style: Greek Revival
- NRHP reference No.: 85003187
- Added to NRHP: December 30, 1985

Griers Presbyterian Church and Cemetery is a historic Presbyterian church and cemetery located near Frogsboro, Caswell County, North Carolina. It was built about 1856, and is a simple, rectangular frame building. It is an example of Greek Revival temple-form church architecture. Also on the property is a contributing church cemetery.

It was listed on the National Register of Historic Places in 1985.
