= Beechwood Cemetery (Durham, North Carolina) =

Cemetery in North Carolina, United States

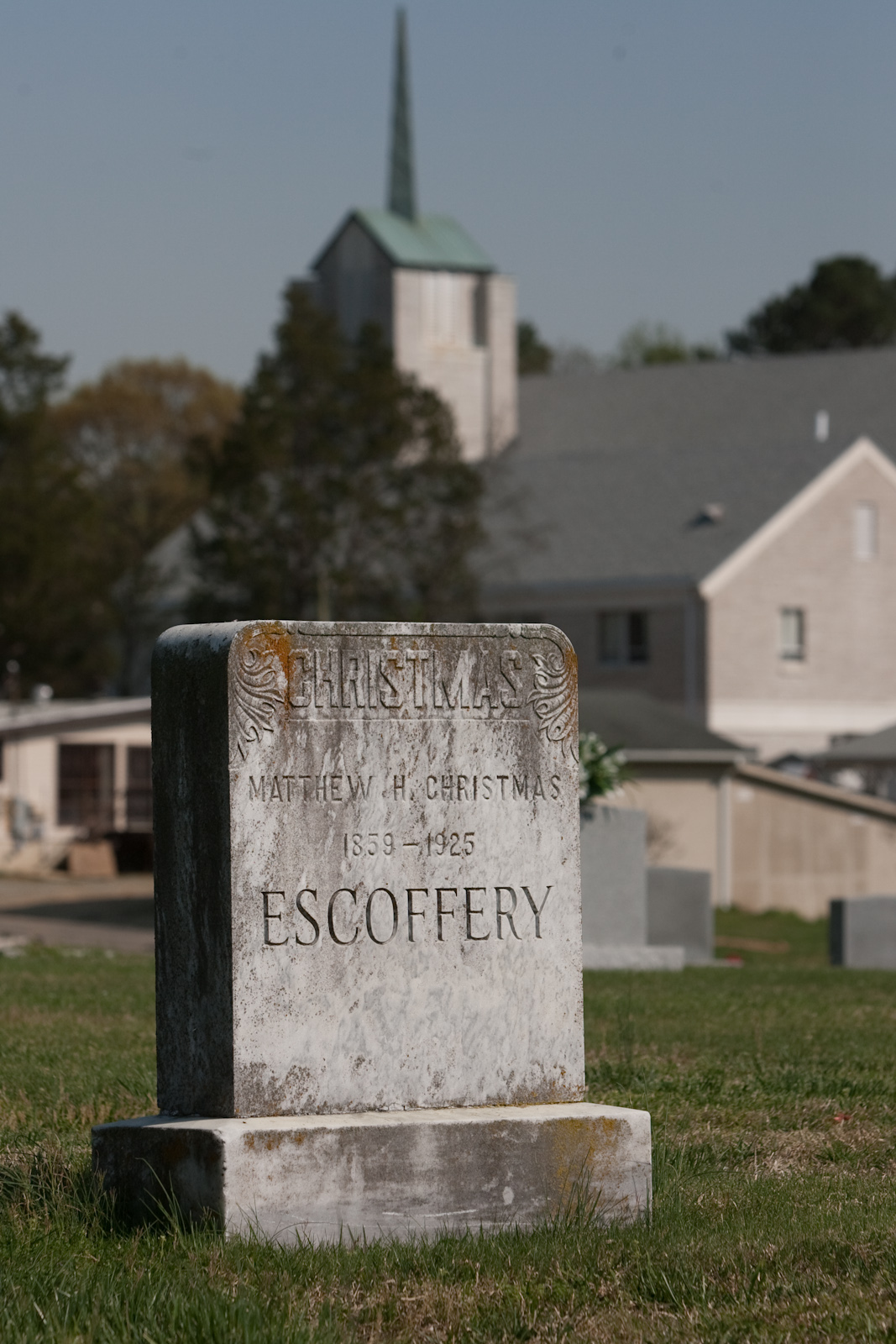
- Tombstone, with White Rock Baptist Church in background.
- Interactive map of Beechwood Cemetery

Details
- Established: 1924
- Location: 3300 Fayetteville Street; Durham, North Carolina
- Country: United States
- Coordinates: 35°57′33″N 78°54′44″W
- Owned by: City of Durham
- No. of graves: >9,000
- Website: Official website
- Find a Grave: Beechwood Cemetery

Beechwood Cemetery is a city-owned cemetery in Durham, North Carolina, established in 1924 or 1926. Maplewood, the city's other public cemetery was historically white while Beechwood is historically black stemming from the city's segregation at their inception. It is the burial location of key Black figures in Durham's history.

The five cemeteries, which Beechwood replaced when the city purchased 25 acres from R.L. McDougald, were mostly full and undermaintained.

An expansion was proposed in 2023 as the cemetery neared capacity.

== Notable burials ==
- Robert Kelly Bryant Jr. (1917–2015), historian
- John Merrick (1859–1919), businessman
- James E. Shepard (1875–1947), pharmacist, civil servant, and educator
- Charles Clinton Spaulding (1874–1952), businessman

== Gallery ==
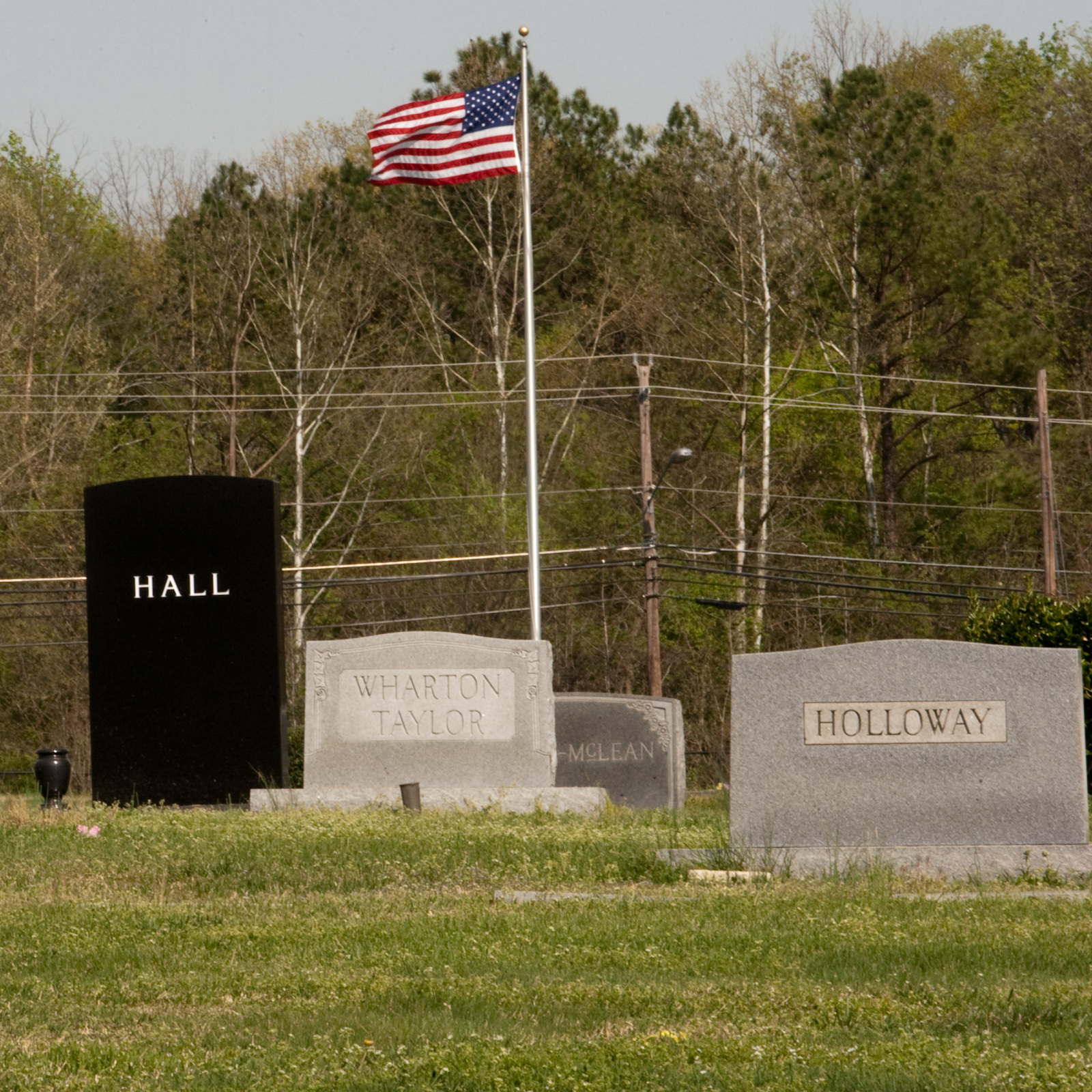
Looking east at multiple tombstones and a flagpole

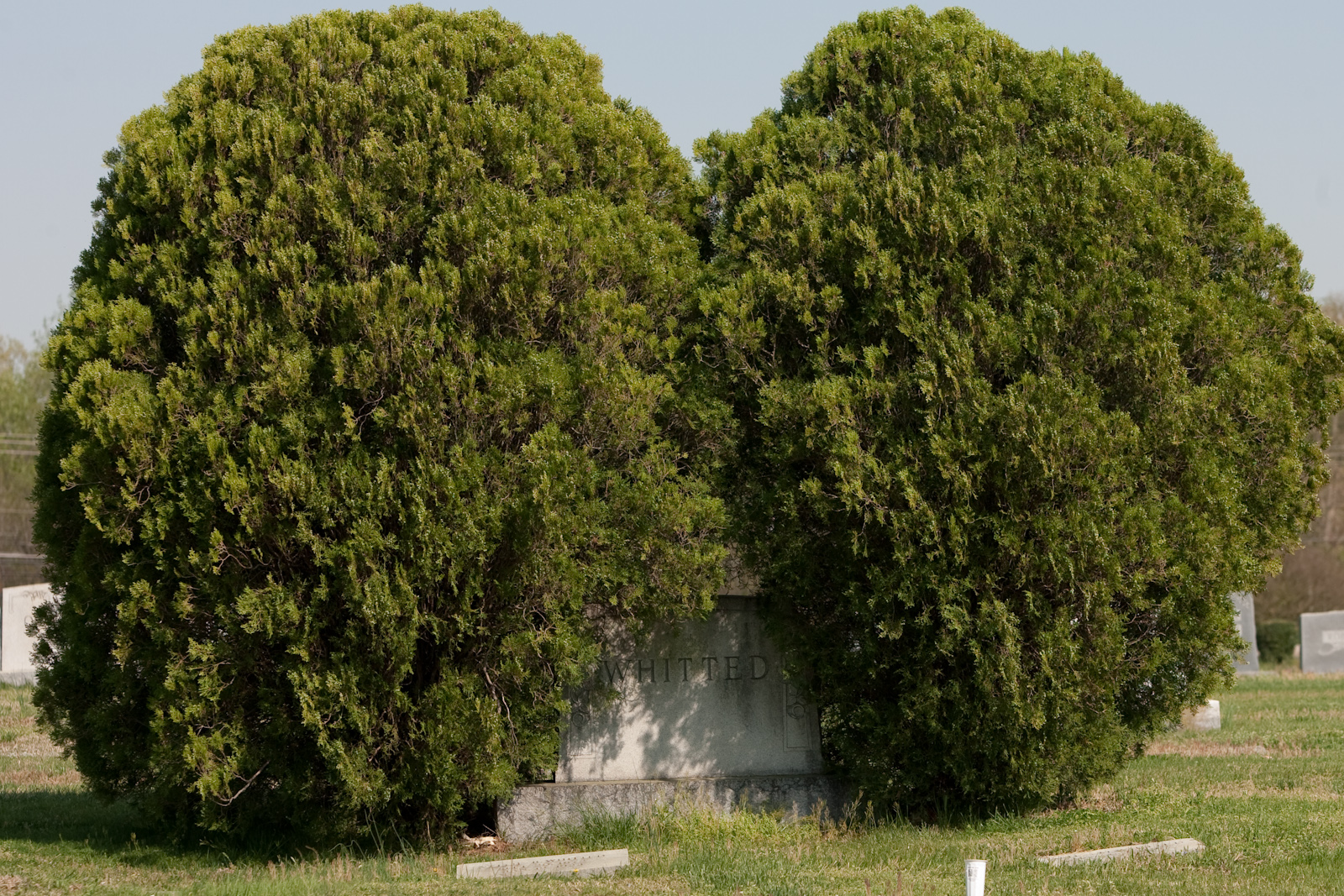
Plot of Nellie and James Whitted, overgrown by evergreens

== See also ==
- African American cemeteries in North Carolina
