= Tabernacle Methodist Protestant Church and Cemetery =

Historic site in Guilford County, North Carolina, US

- U.S. National Register of Historic Places
- U.S. Historic district
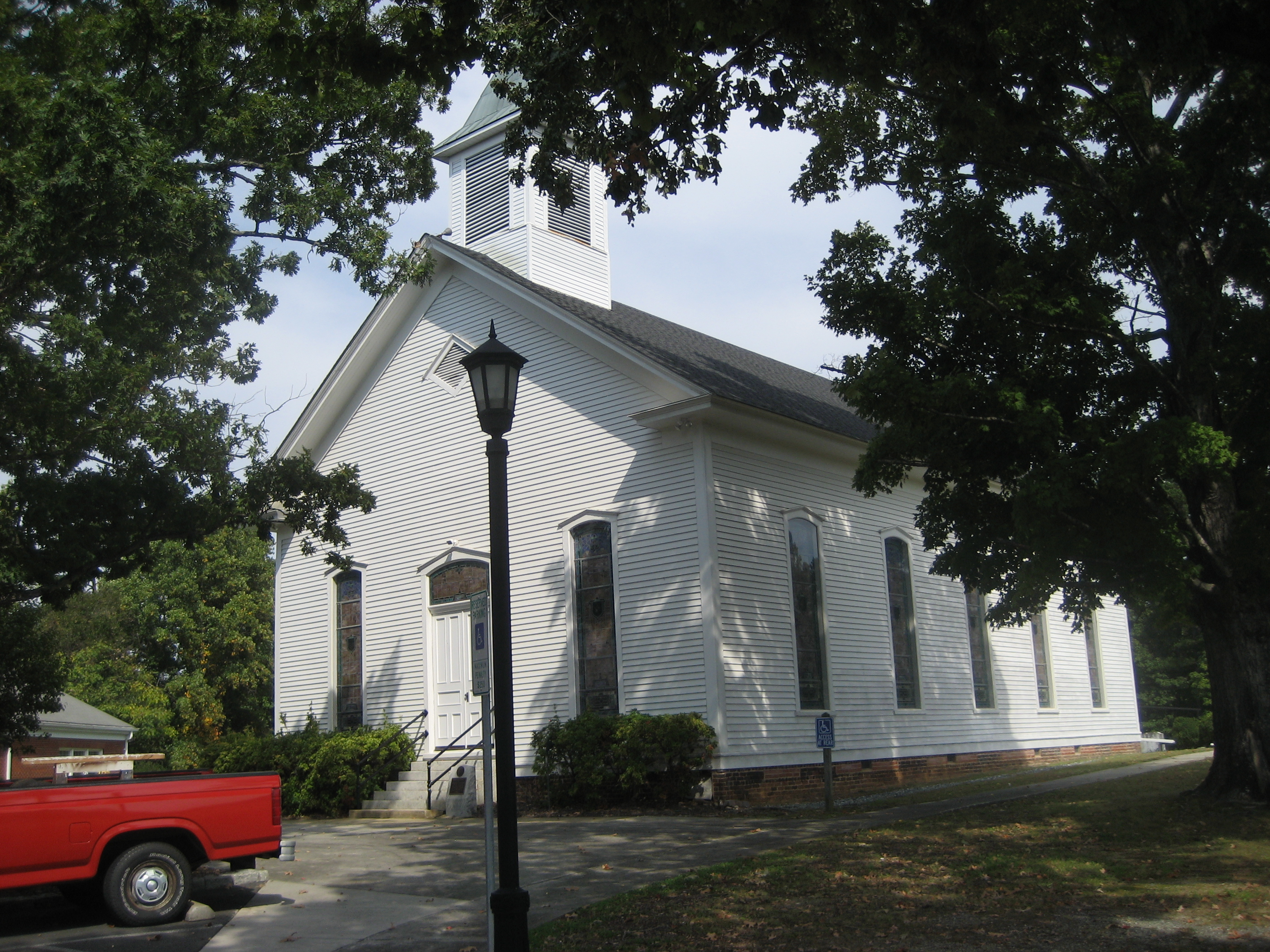
- Tabernacle Methodist Protestant Church, September 2012

- Location within North Carolina Location within the United States
- Location: 5601 Liberty Rd., Greensboro, North Carolina
- Coordinates: 35°57′55″N 79°41′49″W
- Area: 6 acres (2.4 ha)
- Built: 1822
- Architectural style: Gothic Revival
- NRHP reference No.: 95000231
- Added to NRHP: March 10, 1995

Tabernacle Methodist Protestant Church and Cemetery is a historic Methodist church building and cemetery and national historic district located at 5601 Liberty Road in Greensboro, North Carolina. The church was built in 1891, and is a one-story, frame building with a gable roof topped by a belfry. It features Gothic Revival style design elements. The associated cemetery was established about 1822. The parish is now known as Tabernacle United Methodist Church, with its new sanctuary being built in 1994.

It was listed on the National Register of Historic Places in 1995.

== See also ==
- Tabernacle (Methodist)
