= Vance Cemetery =

Cemetery in Buncombe County, North Carolina

- Oldest headstone in Vance Cemetery
- Interactive map of Vance Cemetery

Details
- Established: 1813
- Location: Vance Cemetery Road, Weaverville, North Carolina
- Coordinates: 35.7027°N 82.4980°W
- Find a Grave: Vance Cemetery

Vance Cemetery is a cemetery at the end of Vance Cemetery Road in Weaverville, North Carolina. The cemetery opened in 1813 when David Vance Sr. was buried.
