= Summerville Presbyterian Church and Cemetery =

Historic church in North Carolina, United States

- U.S. National Register of Historic Places
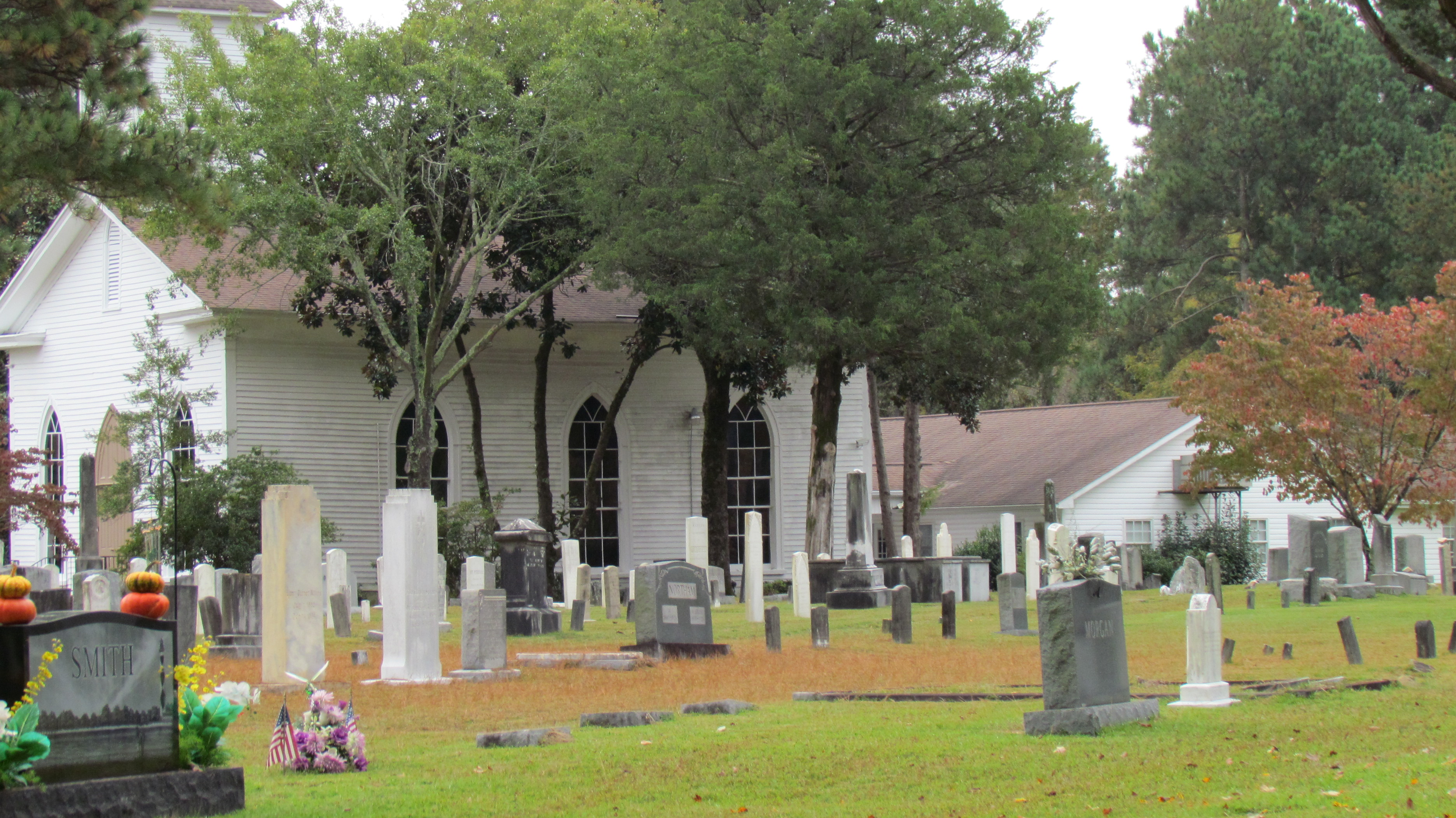

- Location within North Carolina Location within the United States
- Location: Off SR 1291, near Lillington, North Carolina
- Coordinates: 35°24′10″N 78°51′19″W
- Area: 2.9 acres (1.2 ha)
- Built: 1848
- Architectural style: Greek Revival, Gothic Revival
- NRHP reference No.: 85000903
- Added to NRHP: April 25, 1985

Summerville Presbyterian Church and Cemetery is a historic Presbyterian church and cemetery located near Lillington, Harnett County, North Carolina. The original church was built in 1811, burned down due to being struck by lightning, and was rebuilt in 1848. It is a simple rectangular frame building with Greek Revival and Gothic Revival design elements. The adjacent cemetery includes approximately 150 burial plots and a fine collection of mid and late-19th century markers.

It was listed on the National Register of Historic Places in 1985.
