= Ramah Presbyterian Church and Cemetery =

Historic site in Mecklenburg County, North Carolina, US

- U.S. National Register of Historic Places
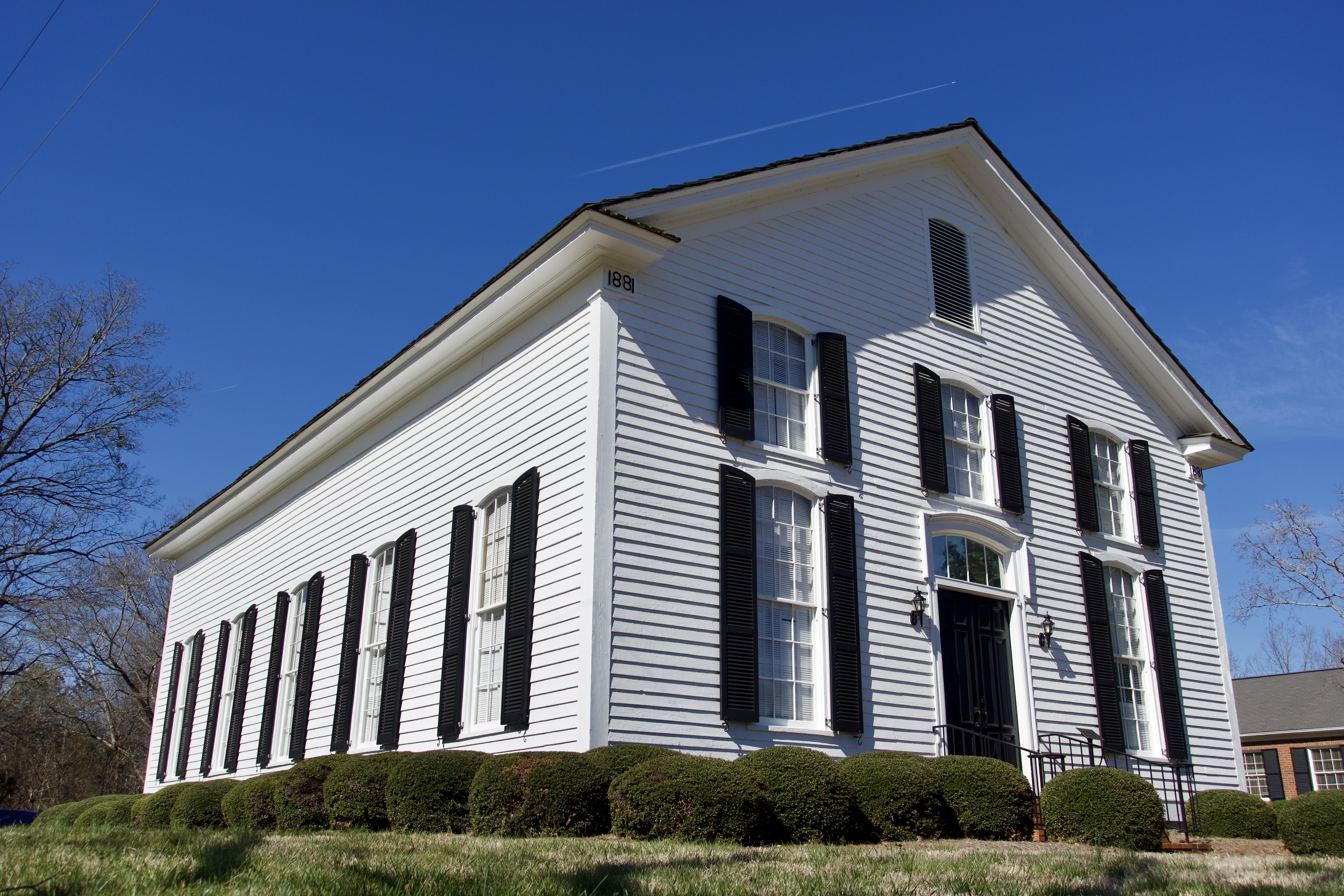
- Ramah Presbyterian Church sanctuary

- Location within North Carolina Location within the United States
- Location: NC 2439 .3 miles N of jct. with NC 2426, near Huntersville, North Carolina
- Coordinates: 35°26′22″N 80°48′10″W
- Area: 5 acres (2.0 ha)
- Built: 1801, 1881
- Architectural style: Greek Revival, Italianate, Vernacular Gk. Revival/Ital.
- MPS: Rural Mecklenburg County MPS
- NRHP reference No.: 91000081
- Added to NRHP: February 21, 1991

Ramah Presbyterian Church and Cemetery is a historic Presbyterian church and cemetery located near Huntersville, Mecklenburg County, North Carolina. The current church sanctuary was built in 1881, and is a rectangular, gable-front vernacular Greek Revival / Italianate style frame building. It is three bays wide and has segmental-arched, double-hung sash windows and a tall rectangular and segmental-arched louvered vent. Also on the property is a one-story, log Fellowship Building built in 1935. The cemetery contains approximately 500 burials, with the oldest dating to about 1800.

It was added to the National Register of Historic Places in 1991.
