= Snow Creek Methodist Church and Burying Ground =

Historic church in North Carolina, United States

- U.S. National Register of Historic Places
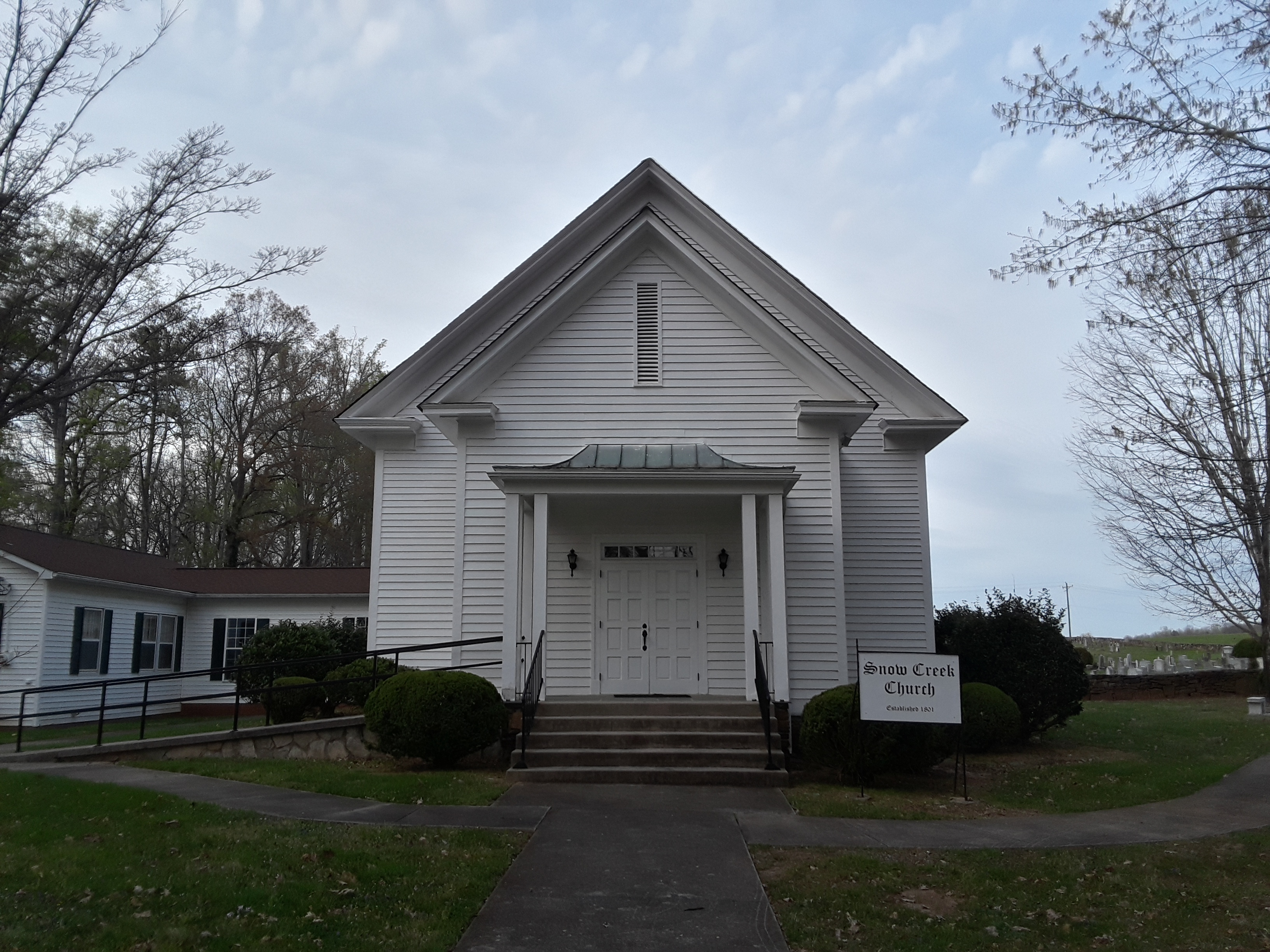
- Front of the church building, April 2022

- Location within North Carolina Location within the United States
- Location: Off SR 1904, near Statesville, North Carolina
- Coordinates: 35°54′37″N 80°55′12″W
- Area: 11.8 acres (4.8 ha)
- Built: 1884-1885
- Architectural style: Greek Revival, Late Greek Revival
- MPS: Iredell County MRA
- NRHP reference No.: 80002854
- Added to NRHP: November 24, 1980

Snow Creek Methodist Church and Burying Ground is a historic Methodist church building and cemetery located about 10 miles north of Statesville, Iredell County, North Carolina. The church was established in 1801. The existing church building was built in 1884–1885, and is a one-story, one bay by four bay, rectangular frame church in the late Greek Revival style. It has a steep gable roof and vestibule added in the mid-20th century. Also on the property is the contributing church cemetery, which dates from 1780. Graves in the cemetery include that of William Sharpe.

It was added to the National Register of Historic Places in 1980.

== History ==
The Snow Creek Methodist Church was established in 1801 during the Great Revival Period. The burial ground has been there since the 1780s. The church that became Snow Creek Methodist was originally known as King's Methodist-Episcopal Meeting House. The land for the church was deeded to the church by William Sharpe in 1806.
