= Steele Creek Presbyterian Church and Cemetery =

Historic site in Mecklenburg County, North Carolina, US

- U.S. National Register of Historic Places
- U.S. Historic district
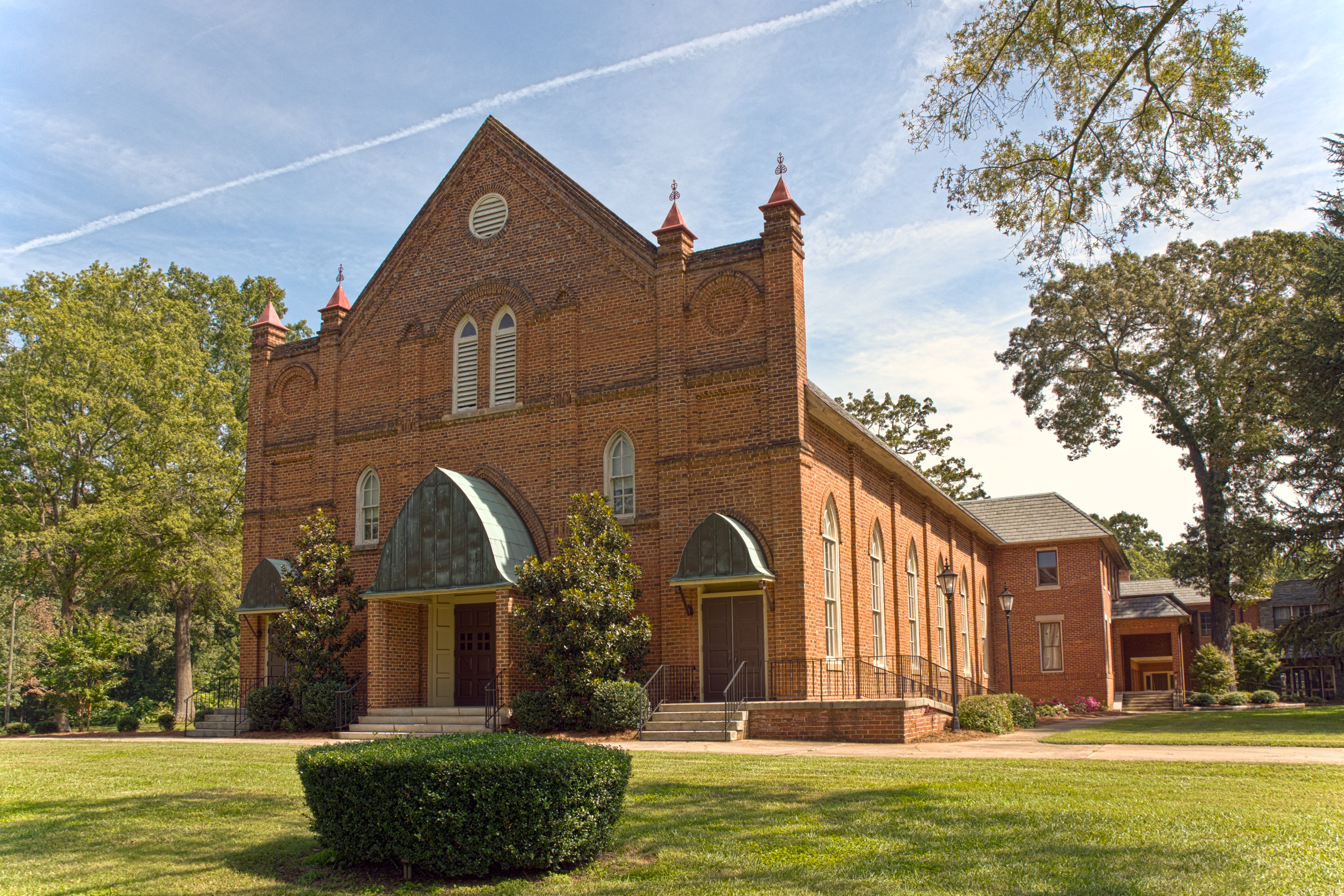
- Steele Creek Presbyterian Church

- Location within North Carolina Location within the United States
- Location: 7407 Steele Creek Rd., near Charlotte, North Carolina
- Coordinates: 35°11′3″N 80°57′23″W
- Area: 17 acres (6.9 ha)
- Built: 1889
- Architect: Norris, H.J.; Bigham Workshop
- Architectural style: Gothic Revival
- MPS: Rural Mecklenburg County MPS
- NRHP reference No.: 91000082
- Added to NRHP: February 21, 1991

Steele Creek Presbyterian Church and Cemetery is a historic Presbyterian church complex and national historic district located near Charlotte, Mecklenburg County, North Carolina. The church was founded in 1760 and the current sanctuary was built in 1889, and is a rectangular, Gothic Revival-style brick building. It is five bays wide and six bays deep, and has pointed-arched sash windows, shallow buttresses, and steeply pitched roof parapet. The cemetery contains approximately 1,700 headstones, with the oldest dating to 1763.

It was added to the National Register of Historic Places in 1991.

== Notable members ==
- John McDowell, namesake of the McDowell Nature Preserve, former member of the Mecklenburg County Parks and Recreation Commission, local farmer and first responder to the Eastern Air Lines Flight 212 crash.
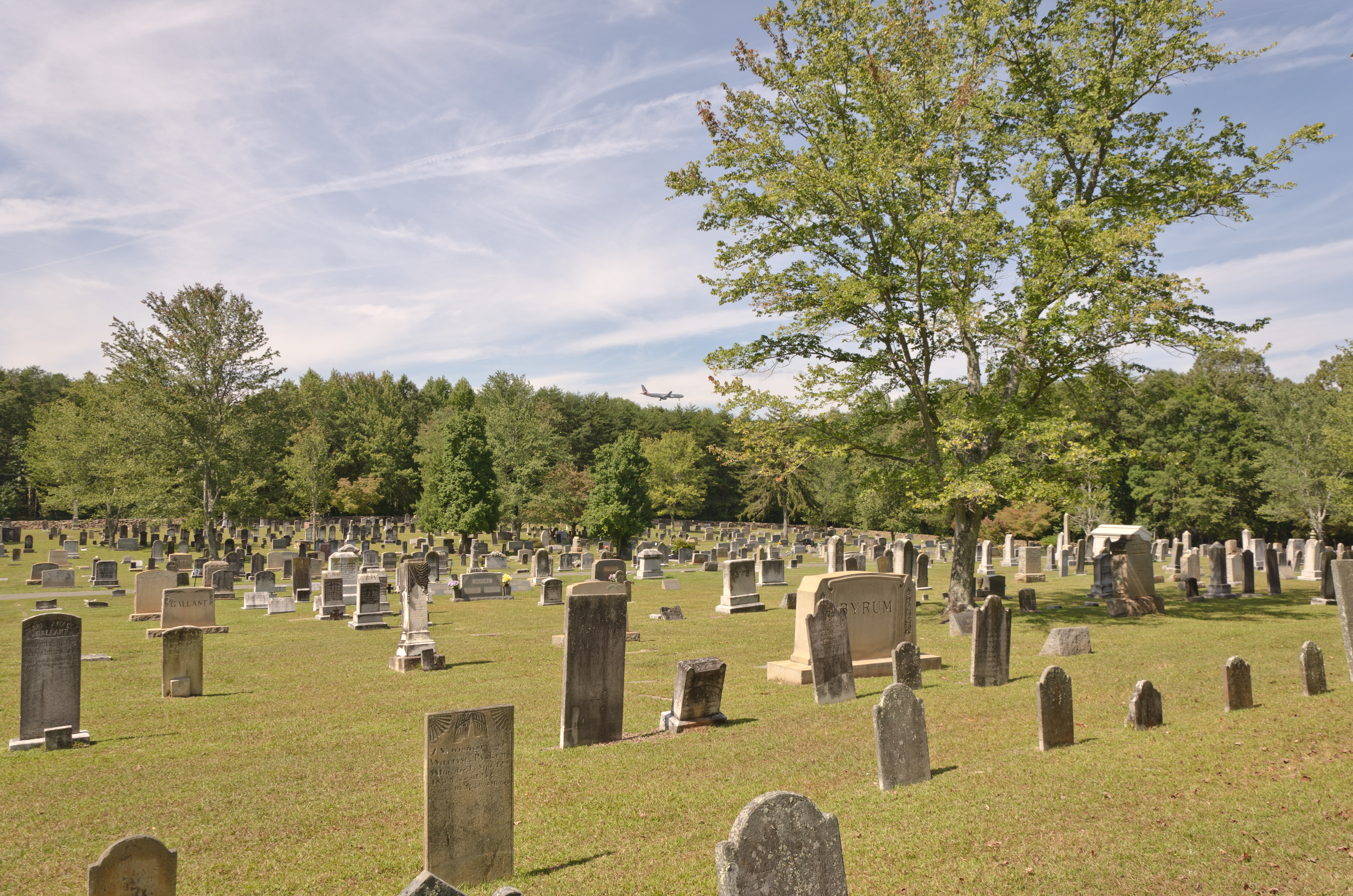
Steele Creek Cemetery
