= Abbott's Creek Primitive Baptist Church Cemetery =

Historic cemetery in Davidson County, North Carolina

- U.S. National Register of Historic Places
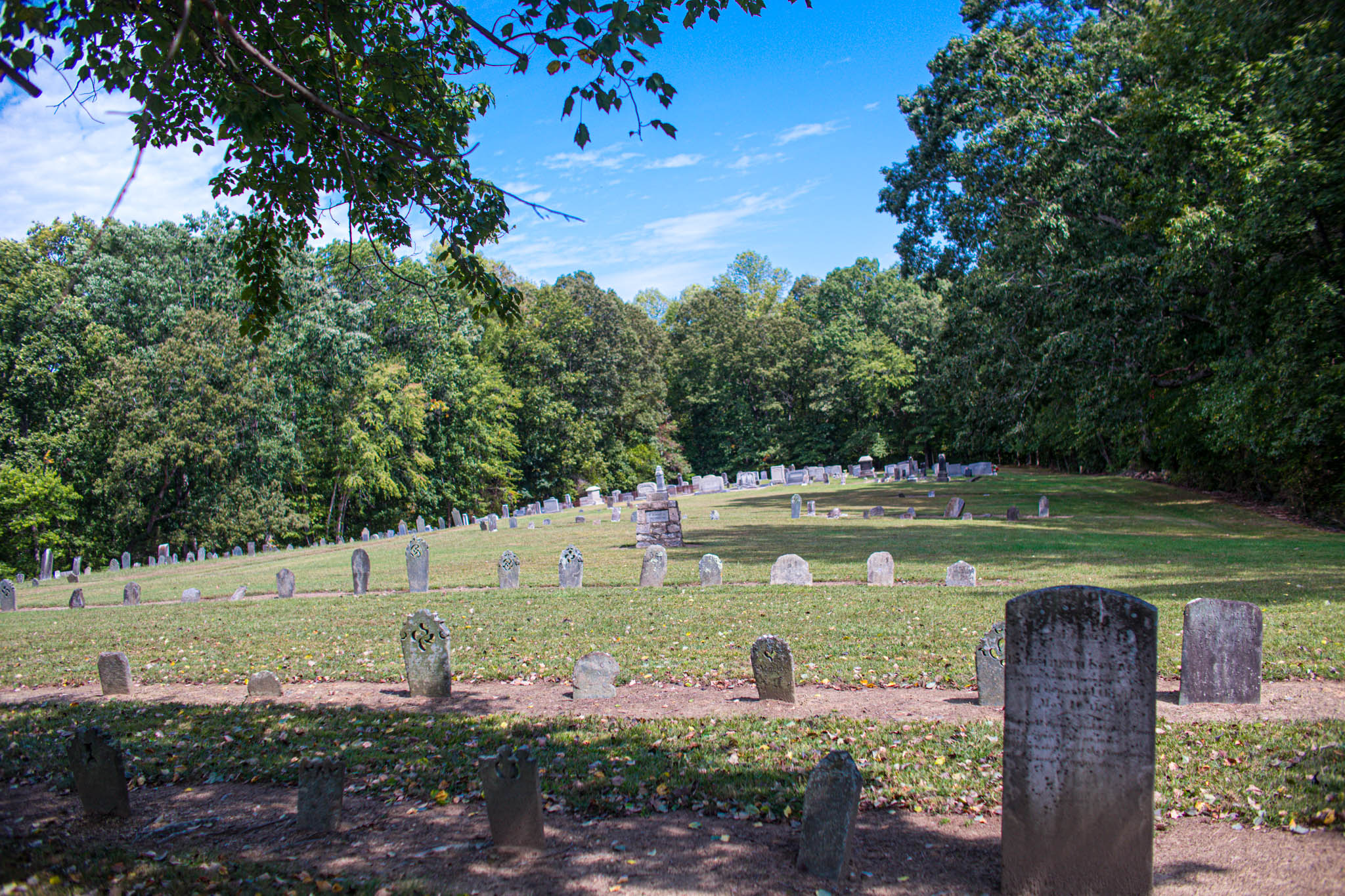

- Location within North Carolina Location within the United States
- Location: SR 1743, near Thomasville, North Carolina
- Coordinates: 36°00′19″N 80°05′09″W; GNIS data
- Area: 2 acres (0.81 ha)
- Architect: Clodfelter, Joseph
- MPS: Anglo-German Cemeteries TR
- NRHP reference No.: 84001982
- Added to NRHP: July 10, 1984

Abbott's Creek Primitive Baptist Church Cemetery is a historic Primitive Baptist church cemetery near Thomasville, Davidson County, North Carolina.

There are approximately 450 gravestones, with the earliest headstone dating to 1795. Around one dozen unmarked field stones may date even earlier. The 351 locally manufactured gravestones makes it the largest such group in Davidson County, North Carolina. All of the epitaphs are inscribed in English because of the English and Scotch-Irish settlers who were members of the church. This was in spite of the headstones being cut by local German stonecutters.

It was listed on the National Register of Historic Places in 1984.
