= Quaker Meadows Cemetery =

Historic cemetery in North Carolina, United States

- U.S. National Register of Historic Places
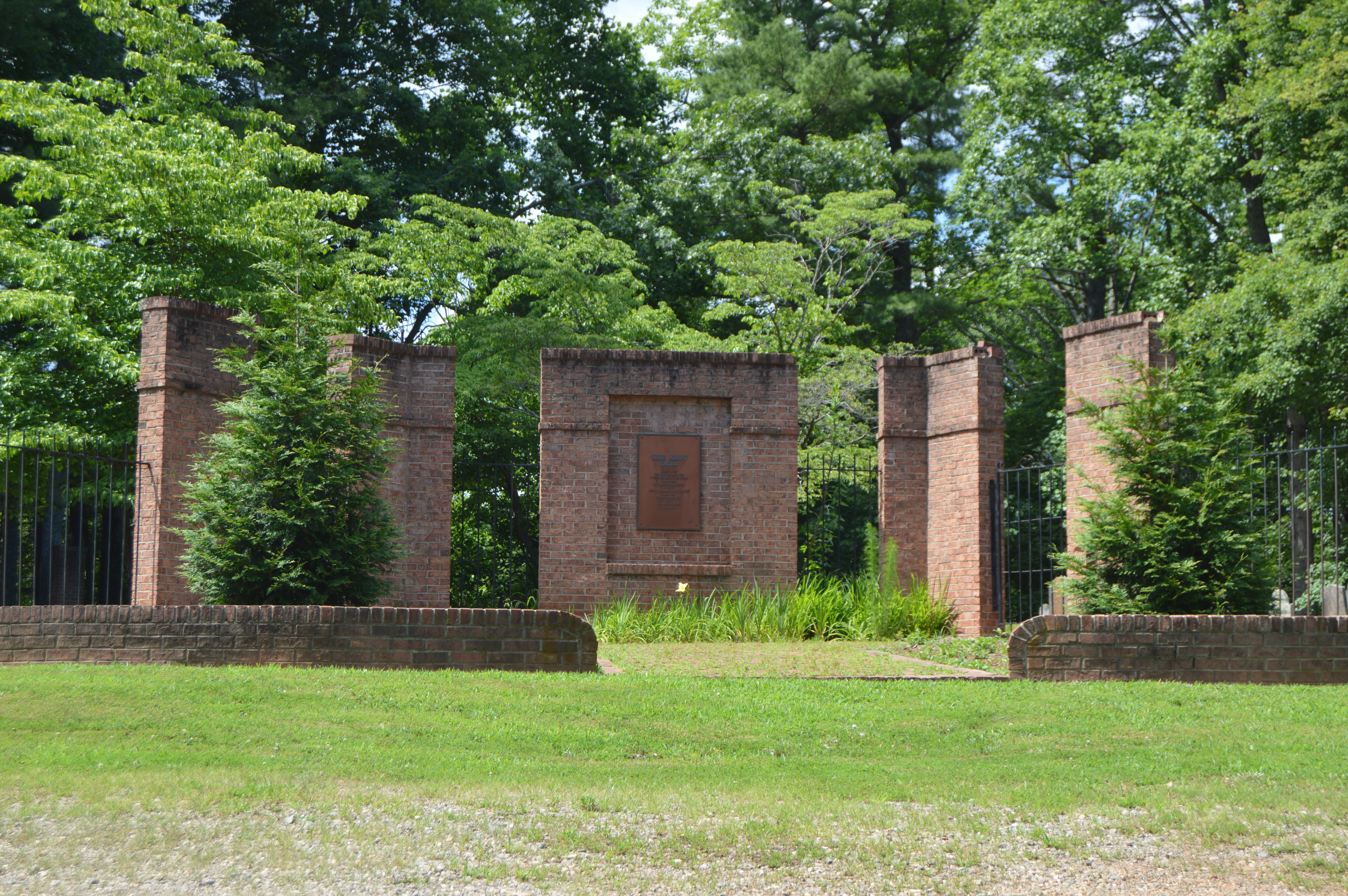
- Main entrance

- Location within North Carolina Location within the United States
- Location: Off NC 126, Morganton, North Carolina
- Coordinates: 35°45′6″N 81°43′18″W
- Area: 0.8 acres (0.32 ha)
- Built: 1767
- MPS: Morganton MRA
- NRHP reference No.: 87001922
- Added to NRHP: November 9, 1987

Quaker Meadows Cemetery is a historic cemetery located near Morganton, North Carolina, U.S.. It includes 59 gravesites dated between 1767 and 1879; 53 of them are marked by gravestones. The earliest grave is of David McDowell (1767), the two-year-old grandson of Joseph McDowell, the first permanent white settler in the area.

It was listed on the National Register of Historic Places in 1987.
