= Sharon Memorial Park, North Carolina =

Coordinates: 35.1868472°N 80.7720136°W

Sharon Memorial Park
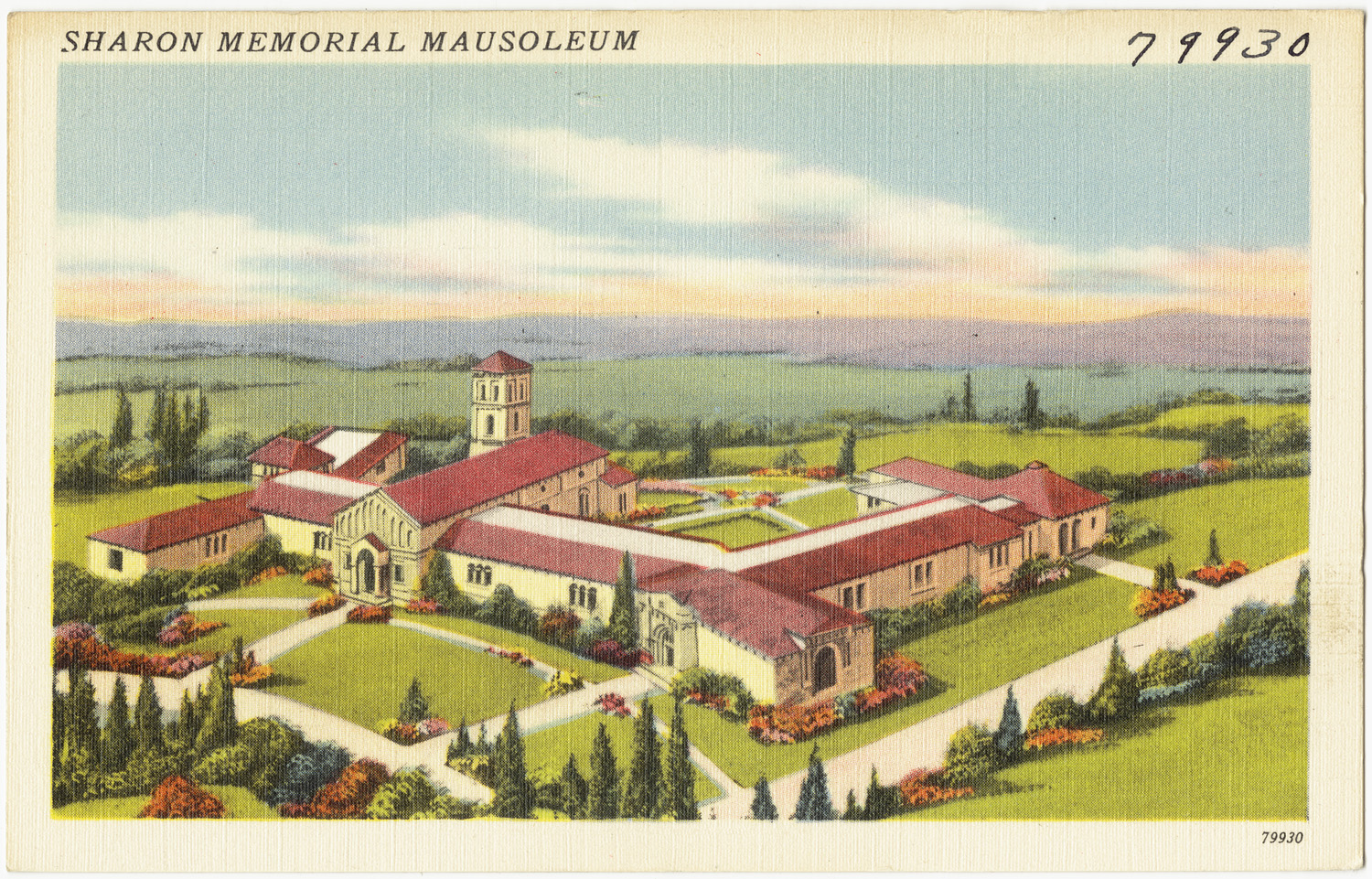
- Sharon Memorial Mausoleum
- Interactive map of Sharon Memorial Park

Details
- Location: 5716 Monroe Road, Charlotte, North Carolina
- Country: U.S.
- No. of interments: roughly 36,900
- Website: Official website
- Find a Grave: Sharon Memorial Park

Sharon Memorial Park is a crematory and cemetery located at 5716 Monroe Road in Charlotte, North Carolina, US. Notable people interred there include baseball players Bob Porterfield and Ben Paschal, and former Daytona 500 winner Buddy Baker. It also goes by the name Sharon Mausoleum.
