= Green Lawn Cemetery (China Grove, North Carolina) =

Cemetery in Rowan County, North Carolina

- Interactive map of Green Lawn Cemetery

Details
- Established: 1798
- Location: China Grove, Rowan County, North Carolina
- Country: USA
- Coordinates: 35.55810°N 80.59190°W
- Find a Grave: Green Lawn Cemetery

Green Lawn Cemetery is a cemetery located in China Grove, North Carolina. Graves marked as early as 1798 have been found in Green Lawn Cemetery.

One person of note interred at Green Lawn Cemetery is Dixie Upright.
