= Holly Grove =

Holly Grove may refer to:

== Places ==
=== United States ===
- Holly Grove, Arkansas, a town
  - Holly Grove Historic District, Holly Grove, Arkansas, listed on the NRHP in Monroe County, Arkansas
- Holly Grove, Davidson County, North Carolina, an unincorporated community
- Holly Grove, Gates County, North Carolina, an unincorporated communities
- Holly Grove, West Virginia, an unincorporated community
- Holly Grove Methodist Church, Anacoco, Louisiana, listed on the NRHP in Vernon Parish, Louisiana
- Holly Grove (Clinton, Louisiana), listed on the NRHP in East Feliciana Parish, Louisiana
- Holly Grove Plantation House, Bolton, Mississippi, NRHP-listed
- Holly Grove (Centreville, Mississippi), listed on the NRHP in Wilkinson County, Mississippi
- Holly Grove Site, Sledge, Mississippi, NRHP-listed
- Holly Grove Mansion, Charleston, West Virginia, listed on the NRHP in West Virginia

== See also ==
- Hollygrove (disambiguation)
- Holly Grove School (disambiguation)
