= Gary Lee Sampson =

American spree killer (1959–2021)

- Born: September 29, 1959; Weymouth, Massachusetts, U.S.
- Died: December 21, 2021 (aged 62); MCFP Springfield, Springfield, Missouri, U.S.
- Children: 3
- Status: Deceased
- Conviction: Carjacking resulting in death (2 counts)
- Penalty: Death

Details
- Victims: 3
- Date: July 24–30, 2001
- Country: United States
- Locations: Taunton, Massachusetts; Kingston, Massachusetts; Concord, New Hampshire
- Weapon: Knife

Gary Lee Sampson (September 29, 1959 – December 21, 2021) was an American bank robber and later spree killer who killed three people and was sentenced to death by a federal jury in Massachusetts.

During six days in 2001, Sampson killed three strangers – retiree Philip McCloskey in Marshfield, Massachusetts, college student Jonathan Rizzo in Abington, Massachusetts, and Robert Whitney in Meredith, New Hampshire. He also attempted to kill a fourth victim and stranger, William Gregory, in Plymouth, Vermont. Sampson killed McCloskey and Rizzo after they picked him up hitch-hiking, stabbing them to death. Shortly after that he strangled Whitney. Sampson pleaded guilty to the three killings on September 9, 2003, and was sentenced to death on December 23, 2003, by a federal jury in Massachusetts. He received the death penalty for the two Massachusetts killings, and a life sentence for the New Hampshire case.

After Sampson pleaded guilty, a federal jury decided whether he should be sentenced to death or life in prison. The defense introduced mental health experts to testify that Sampson had dyslexia as a child, had bipolar disorder, and "suffered from a significant mental impairment" during the killings. A psychiatrist called by the government testified that Sampson did not have any mitigating mental impairment; he was intelligent but violent and deeply antisocial, with antisocial personality disorder. The jury of 12 unanimously returned a sentence of death.

In 2011, Sampson's death sentence was thrown out due to juror misconduct, and he was scheduled for a second sentencing trial on September 16, 2015. He was again sentenced to death on January 9, 2017. He died in 2021 at the age of 62, presumably from end stage liver disease.

== Early and personal life ==
Gary Sampson, was born in Weymouth, Massachusetts, and raised in Abington, Massachusetts. His parents were Charlotte and Elbert "Herc" Sampson. His father worked as a firefighter, ice cream truck driver, and salesman. Sampson has claimed that his father called him "retarded" and physically abused him. Sampson's defense lawyers claim that at age four, he fell and hit his head, resulting in a brain injury. Sampson was diagnosed with dyslexia as a child but was denied special education because of his intelligence. He dropped out of school in the 9th grade.

Sampson had been frequently arrested as a juvenile, and as an adult was caught on surveillance tape robbing five banks in North Carolina while in disguise. Gerald Hege, sheriff of Davidson County, North Carolina, stated that Sampson had lived with cross-dressers and transvestites, and had learned "elaborate makeup" from them. "He learned how to change his appearance."

As of 2003, Sampson had been married and divorced five times, and was the father of three children. His first marriage was when he was 17 years old. In 1995, after being released from jail on a theft charge, he moved to Tamworth, New Hampshire, where he met Karen Alexander. In June 1997, Sampson and Alexander were married; she was pregnant by Sampson at the time. Shortly after, he moved to South Carolina with a woman he had recently met, and Alexander filed for divorce that same year. Sampson was arrested in May 1998, and met Amanda Newcomb while jailed. When Newcomb's grandfather posted Sampson's bail, Sampson and Newcomb married in October 1998. By the end of November, Sampson had moved to North Carolina, where he had a relationship with Ricky Carter, who recalled him as "angry with the world and having an explosive temper." When Carter kicked him out of their apartment, Sampson met and wooed Karen Anderson in April 2001. Sampson attempted to force Anderson to assist him in his robberies; she refused, and Sampson began his bank robbery spree, robbing five banks in three months.

== Crimes and death penalty trial ==
In July 2001 Sampson carjacked and murdered three people: Philip McCloskey (aged 69 of Taunton, Massachusetts), Jonathan Rizzo (aged 19 of Kingston, Massachusetts), and Robert Whitney (aged 58 of Concord, New Hampshire). The murders took place over the course of a week. Sampson told police that, after McCloskey picked him up hitchhiking, he forced him at knifepoint to drive to a secluded area, where he tied him up with his belt and stabbed him 24 times. He also forced Rizzo to a secluded area, tied him to a tree, gagged him, and killed him.

The day before the first murder, he attempted to surrender to police. Telephone records confirmed that Sampson had called the Federal Bureau of Investigation (FBI). As a fugitive who was facing bank robbery charges in North Carolina, Sampson could have been taken into custody. The call was accidentally disconnected by an FBI clerk, and no action was taken. After the murders, Sampson broke into a house in Vermont. After his arrest he confessed to the murders. He subsequently pleaded guilty.

Sampson was charged in a federal court in Boston, found guilty and, on December 23, 2003, sentenced to death. The jury deliberated for ten hours after hearing six weeks of evidence. Sampson had pleaded guilty, so the jury did not need to decide whether he killed McCloskey and Rizzo, but the jury heard the murders described in graphic detail during the sentencing phase of the trial. Prosecutors portrayed Sampson as a ruthless, calculating killer who preyed on good samaritans. Massachusetts does not have the death penalty, after having abolished capital punishment in 1984. The last time the Commonwealth used the penalty was in 1947. It was the first time anyone in Massachusetts has been sentenced to die under the federal death penalty law. Federal law was changed in 1994 to allow the U.S. Department of Justice to seek the death penalty when a murder is committed during a carjacking or kidnapping.

=== Place of planned execution ===
Although the United States has a federal "death row" at the United States Penitentiary, Terre Haute, in Indiana (where federal death row inmates are executed), U.S. District Judge Mark L. Wolf of the U.S. District Court in Boston ordered that Sampson be executed in New Hampshire. However, before the execution could take place, Judge Wolf ordered a new sentencing trial for Sampson.

=== Appeal process ===
After Sampson was sentenced to death, his lawyer David Ruhnke said he would appeal. In 2011, the death penalty decision was vacated by the US district judge after finding that one of the jurors lied during the screening process; a federal appeals court upheld the decision. Therefore, there was to be another sentencing trial.

=== Second sentencing trial ===
A sentencing retrial was first scheduled for February 2015, but was postponed to September 16, 2015. Judge Wolf said that one reason for the delay until September was because Sampson had been transferred to United States Medical Center for Federal Prisoners to undergo a mental health evaluation which had an effect of "obstructing his lawyers' efforts to meet with him."

A week before the September sentencing retrial was to begin, it was "stalled while prosecutors decide whether to appeal a federal judge's refusal to step down from the case." Prosecutors were given until October 13 to decide if they would appeal the judge's decision. On October 28, in an 89-page ruling, Judge Wolf rejected numerous defense motions, ruling that jurors will be able to consider the death penalty.

Sampson was sentenced to death again on January 9, 2017.

== Death ==
On December 21, 2021, Sampson died at the United States Medical Center for Federal Prisoners in Springfield, Missouri. He was 62 years old. The official cause of death is yet to be released.

== In popular media ==
An episode of Investigation Discovery show Signs of a Psychopath (season 3, episode 6) was made about him.
