= Holly Grove School =

Holly Grove School may refer to:

in England

- Holly Grove School, Lancashire, one of Lancashire's schools

in the United States

- Holly Grove School (Stevens Creek, Arkansas), listed on the NRHP in White County, Arkansas

== See also ==
- Holly Grove (disambiguation)
