= Hollygrove =

Hollygrove may refer to:

- Hollygrove, County Galway, Ireland
- Hollygrove, New Orleans, United States
- Hollygrove, the fictional English village of the Michigan Renaissance Festival, United States
- Hollygrove, West Virginia, United States

== See also ==
- Holly Grove (disambiguation)
