= National Register of Historic Places listings in Vernon Parish, Louisiana =

Location of Vernon Parish in Louisiana

This is a list of the National Register of Historic Places listings in Vernon Parish, Louisiana.

This is intended to be a complete list of the properties and districts on the National Register of Historic Places in Vernon Parish, Louisiana, United States. The locations of National Register properties and districts for which the latitude and longitude coordinates are included below, may be seen in a map.

There are 16 properties and districts listed on the National Register in the parish.

This National Park Service list is complete through NPS recent listings posted December 12, 2025.

== Current listings ==
	Name on the Register	Image	Date listed	Location	City or town	Description
1	Booker-Lewis House	Booker-Lewis House	January 24, 2002 (#01001489)	102 East North St. 31°08′42″N 93°15′48″W	Leesville	
2	Burr's Ferry Bridge	Burr's Ferry Bridge	May 18, 1998 (#98000563)	Louisiana Highway 8 at the Texas state line 31°03′52″N 93°31′02″W	Burr Ferry	Extends into Newton County, Texas
3	Burr's Ferry Earthworks		June 22, 2004 (#04000636)	Louisiana Highway 8; 31°03′56″N 93°30′44″W	Leesville	
4	Downtown Leesville Historic District	Downtown Leesville Historic District	April 9, 2001 (#01000366)	3rd St. between roughly Lula and Lee Sts. 31°08′35″N 93°15′40″W	Leesville	
5	G.R. Ferguson, Sr. House	G.R. Ferguson, Sr. House	November 9, 2001 (#01001209)	406 N. 6th St. 31°08′47″N 93°15′56″W	Leesville	
6	First United Methodist Church	First United Methodist Church	January 24, 2002 (#01001491)	202 N. 5th St. 31°08′40″N 93°15′51″W	Leesville	
7	Fullerton Mill and Town		October 24, 1986 (#86003353)	Louisiana Highway 399; 30°59′36″N 92°58′56″W	Fullerton	
8	Holly Grove Methodist Church		October 8, 1980 (#80001766)	Southwest of Anacoco; 31°13′43″N 93°21′26″W	Anacoco	
9	Kansas City Southern Depot	Kansas City Southern Depot	October 25, 1984 (#84000080)	Louisiana Ave. and 3rd St. 31°08′09″N 93°15′43″W	Leesville	
10	Joseph H. Kurth Jr. House		September 17, 2004 (#04000071)	351 Louisiana Highway 465; 31°20′11″N 93°09′57″W	Leesville vicinity	Surviving house at site of lumber company town.
11	Benson H. Lyons House	Benson H. Lyons House	September 15, 2004 (#04000977)	203 S. 1st St. 31°08′32″N 93°15′34″W	Leesville	
12	Dr. William E. Reid House	Dr. William E. Reid House	April 19, 2001 (#01000387)	300 S. 8th St. 31°08′30″N 93°16′04″W	Leesville	
13	Edmond Ellison Smart House	Edmond Ellison Smart House	December 31, 2002 (#02001636)	301 S. 1st. St. 31°08′30″N 93°15′34″W	Leesville	
14	Talbert-Pierson Grave Shelters	Talbert-Pierson Grave Shelters	May 9, 2003 (#03000378)	Victor Martin Rd. 30°53′24″N 93°03′01″W	Sugartown	
15	Vernon Parish Courthouse	Vernon Parish Courthouse	September 22, 1983 (#83000550)	201 S. 3rd St. 31°08′32″N 93°15′39″W	Leesville	
16	Wingate House	Wingate House	September 26, 1983 (#83000551)	800 S. 8th St. 31°08′27″N 93°16′04″W	Leesville	

== See also ==
- List of National Historic Landmarks in Louisiana
- National Register of Historic Places listings in Louisiana
