= Silver Hill Mine =

Mine in North Carolina

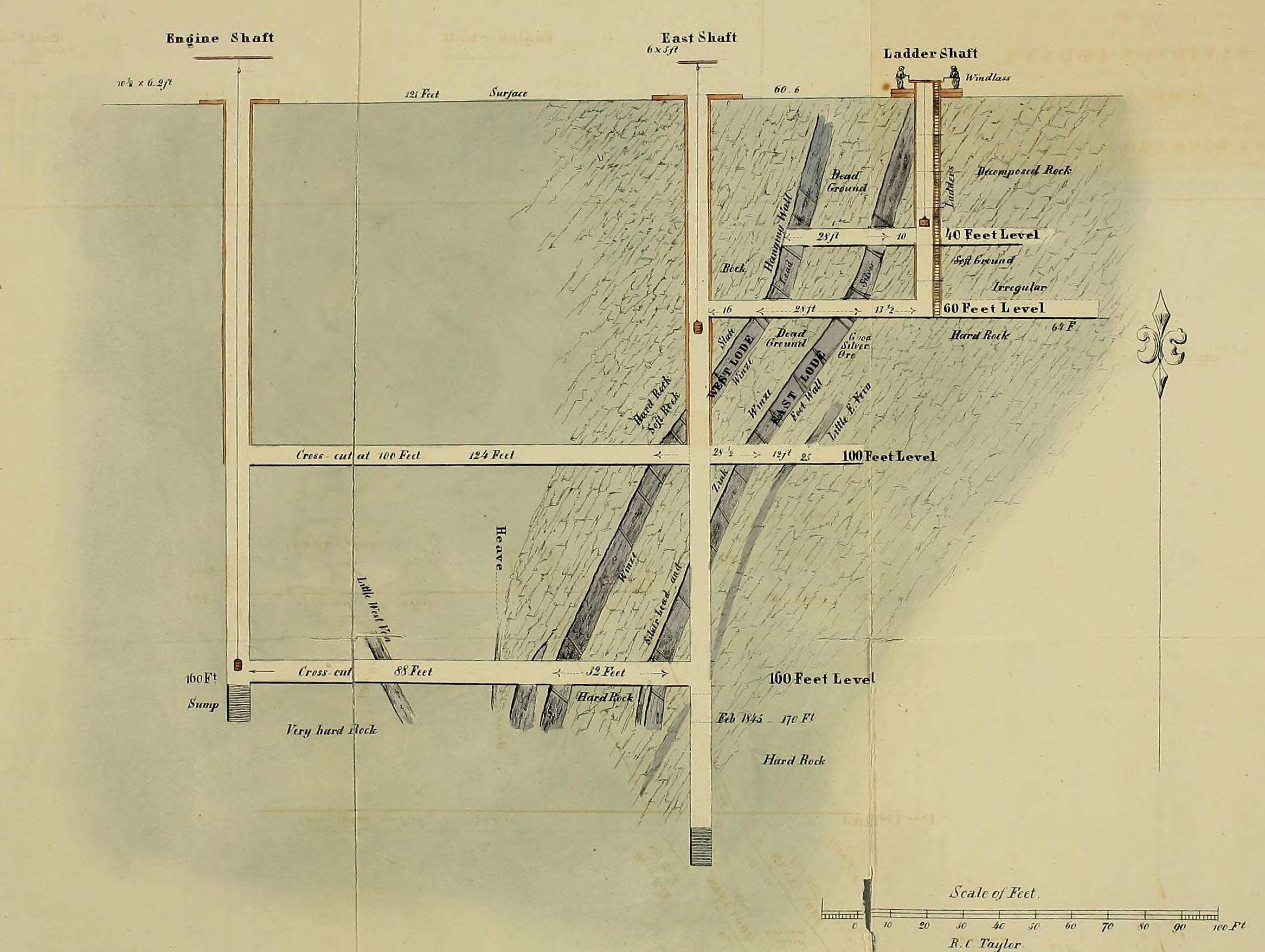
- Diagram of the mine, 1845

- Location within North Carolina
- Location: Silver Hill, North Carolina, United States; 35°42′21″N 80°12′1″W
- Products: Silver; Gold; Lead; Zinc
- Discovered: 1838
- Opened: 1839

The Silver Hill Mine (originally named King's Mine and Washington Mine prior to 1854) was the first silver mine in the United States, later used primarily as a source of lead and zinc. Discovered during the Carolina gold rush at a Davidson County, North Carolina location later named Silver Hill, operations began at the site in 1839 under the Washington Mining Company. Increasing difficulties extracting the silver from ore heavy in lead and zinc led to the introduction of various new metallurgical processes and equipment. These were unable to fully stem losses of silver in refinement, and an increasingly convoluted production chain led to closure of the mine in 1852.

The mine was reopened and acquired by Franklin Osgood in the 1850s, before serving as a secondary lead supplier to the Confederate States during the American Civil War. Expansions of the mine continued during post-war lead and zinc extraction, but the continued expenses of mineral refinement prompted the reabandonment of the mine in 1882. Smaller operations were conducted at the site in the 1890s, 1900s, and 1940s, mainly restricted to the clearing of water and extraction of small amounts of material from the surface levels of the mine. The Tennessee Copper Company briefly expanded the mine in the 1960s before once again abandoning efforts. Although surveys of the site conducted in the 1980s described a considerable amount of viable ore remaining on the site, no further operations have been conducted.

== Background ==
=== Geology ===
The Silver Hill Mine is located in Davidson County, on the western periphery of the Carolina slate belt. The slate belt, composed of volcanic and volcano-sedimentary rock, stretches from peripheries in Virginia and Georgia. Regional datings from trilobite fossils and zircons attest a Cambrian date of the rock, roughly 580 million years old. Metamorphism took place in the region between 520–400 million years ago, preceding shear movement. Regional metamorphic rock is metamorphosed to the biotite zone of the greenschist facies. Some andesite breccia outcroppings are found in the near vicinity of the mine.

Stratigraphic section from Silver Hill formation
Depth		0m	200m							400m			600m	
Formation	Schistose sediment	Siltstone	Maffic tuff	Andesite	Felsic tuff	Maffic tuff	Felsic tuff and rhyolite	Felsic tuff and mudflow breccias	Ore zone	Felsic tuff	Dacite	Felsic tuff	Laminated siltstone	Siltstone and shale

The Silver Hill orebody itself is 1,800 feet (550 m) long and up to 23 feet (7.0 m) thick. While roughly 200 feet (60 m) thick at 18 feet (5 m) depth, below 700 feet (200 m) deep it narrows to only 9 feet (3 m). It is composed of two parallel ore beds of roughly equal thickness. Both are composed of lenses 50 feet (20 m) in diameter. Smaller lenses extend up to 150 feet (50 m) from the ore beds.

=== Early prospecting ===
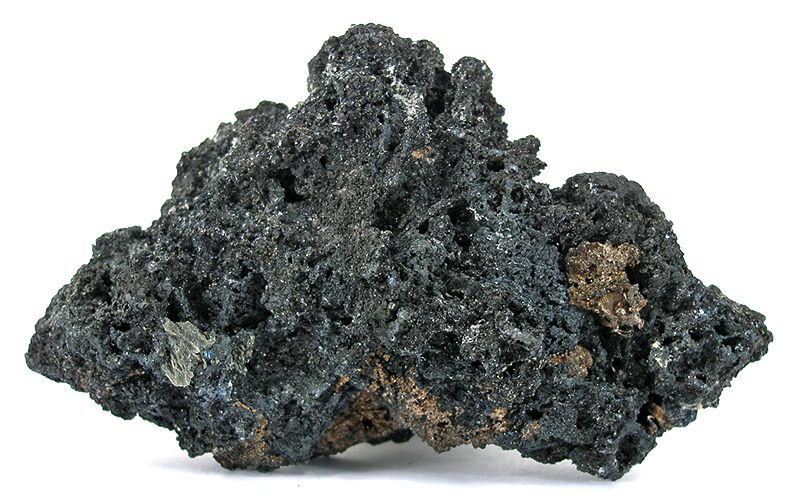
Sample of silver-bearing cerussite from the Silver Hill Mine

The 1799 discovery of gold in Cabarrus County by John Reed sparked the first gold rush of the early United States. North Carolina became a national center of mining and prospecting, with mining becoming the state's second-largest industry behind agriculture. The North Carolina gold belt, comprising much of the western half of the state, was the only domestic source of gold in the United States prior to 1829. Following large-scale lode and placer finds in the 1820s, the rush intensified, reaching its peak during the 1830s and 40s. Farmers in the region frequently sold the mineral rights of their land to speculators. The Charlotte Mint, the first branch of the United States Mint, opened in 1835 to facilitate the production of gold coinage from local mines. It is unknown when prospecting begun in Davidson County, but some had taken place by 1830.

== Discovery ==
During the Carolina Gold Rush, a Mr. Byerly surveyed for gold on his property, about ten miles east of Lexington, North Carolina. In the spring of 1838, he discovered lead carbonate on a shallow hilltop later dubbed Silver Hill. Roswell A. King purchased Byerly's property and began excavating a shaft, naming the site King's Mine. King was a Connecticut-born prospector who returned to the United States in 1829, seeking to participate in the gold rush after time spent in London and Ireland.

=== Minerals ===
The mine contained great quantities of oxidized near-surface ore, with large amounts of lead and native silver. Cerussite was the most common ore in the upper layers, with argentiferous galena found below 60 feet. Not exploited during the early period of the mine's operation, sphalerite deposits were increasingly discovered in the deepest layers of the mine. Pyrite, chalcopyrite, pyromorphite, and small amounts of gold were found in the ore.

Two main veins were found at the site, named the East and West Lodes, separated by around 30 feet (9 m), with two smaller veins later discovered adjacent to the main lodes. Samples taken from the most lucrative portions of the lodes showed a mineral composition of 12% silver, 62% lead, 29% copper, and 27% zinc.

== Washington Mining Company ==
King formed the Washington Mining Company alongside John W. Thomas, receiving a charter by the General Assembly of North Carolina in early January 1839, with the silver site renamed the Washington Mine shortly after. Opening on January 9, 1839, the site became the first silver mine in the United States.

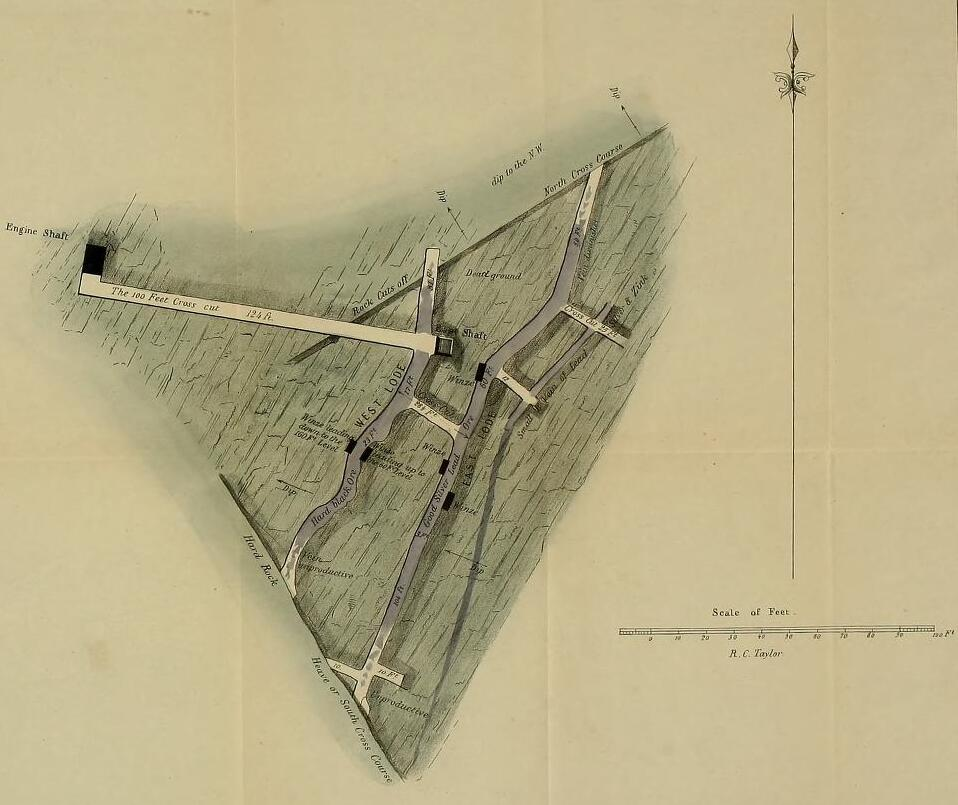
1845 diagram of the mine at 100 feet depth, showing tunnels and crosscuts

=== Shafts ===
Three shafts were built at the site by the mid-1840s. The first and shortest, the Ladder Shaft, was built at the site of initial silver discovery on the East Lode, reaching a depth of 60 feet (18 m), with tunnels dug outward at 40 and 60 feet deep, connected via winzes and raises. A hand-operated windlass was installed to raise excavated material.

The Whim Shaft (later the East Shaft) was built to the west of the Ladder Shaft, initially reaching a depth of around 170 feet (52 m) and accessing both major veins. A tunnel at 60 feet connected to the Ladder Shaft, with additional tunnels at depths of 100 and 160 feet. The shaft was named initially for a horse whim installed at the site, used to transport ore and water. Later excavations led to the East Shaft reaching a depth of 200 feet (61 m) by the late 1840s.

The Engine Shaft, the last shaft installed at the site, was excavated west of the Whim Shaft, reaching a depth of 160 feet (49 m). Crosscuts connected to the Whim Shaft's tunnels at 100 and 160 feet. This shaft was mainly used for hoisting water used both for domestic use and ore processing. In 1845, a steam engine was installed at the shaft for pumping and hoisting.

Two smaller shafts, connected by crosscuts, were dug in 1852 to the north of the Engine Shaft in order to exploit a vein thought to be an extension of the East Lode. The Symonds East shaft reached a depth of 26 feet (8 m), while the nearby Symonds West shaft reached 62 feet (19 m).

=== Operations ===
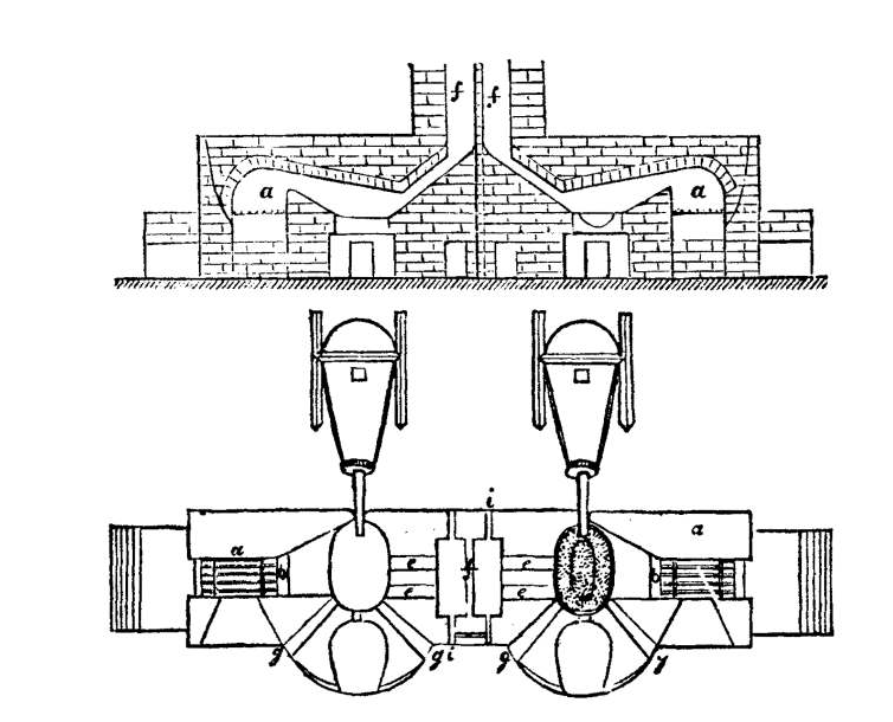
Diagram of an "English-style" reverberatory refining furnace, 1853

Ore from the mine was subject to initial processing on-site. It was hammered into small fragments at a bucking house and washed in troughs to remove slimes. The material was loaded into vats agitated by jigs, with heavier material removed for calcination in calcining furnaces, before smelting in a Scotch hearth furnace to separate slag. The Scotch hearths were inefficient and labor-intensive. In 1841, they were replaced by three high furnaces arranged around a central chimney. Although costly and involving a similar amount of labor, the new furnaces were much more efficient, each able to smelt one ton of lead over a 12-hour period.

Lead pigs were transported from the Washington Mine by wagon to Fayetteville, and transported via the Cape Fear River to Wilmington, from where they were shipped to Philadelphia. At Philadelphia, the lead was processed, and derived gold and silver was sent to the Philadelphia Mint for the production of coinage. Production data is fragmentary, but mint records attest that 160,000 pounds of lead from the mine was processed at Philadelphia stretching from October 1843 to December 1844.

The exploitable width of the lodes decreased as the mine reached deeper levels. At 60 feet, a 300-feet region of the East Lode was mineable, reduced in half at 160 feet depth. The West Lode was even narrower at this depth. Increasing amounts of sphalerite at the lower levels, difficult to smelt and process, led to the losses of material in processing. The ore steadily increased in zinc quantity over time, reaching 45% by 1850.

The mine, during the thirty years of its active work, was practiced on by all kinds of 'process' mongers, and the grounds and buildings are a museum of old and nondescript machinery and metallurgical appliances.

— Henry B. C. Nitze and George B. Hanna, Gold Deposits of North Carolina, 1896

This prompted the Washington Mining Company to investigate different furnace varieties, seeking to both limit loss of precious metal and allow for the refining of lead. English-style reverberatory furnaces were implemented to reduce and purify the molten lead. Later, a German-style refining furnace was also used, able to melt four tons of lead at once. Although the mine was the subject of large-scale metallurgical experimentation, it was unable to fully stem the loss of lead and silver in refinement inefficiencies. Although having little direct effect on lead mining technology in the United States, similar unsuccessful attempts at reverberatory furnaces followed in western lead mines followed prior to the spread of blast furnace refinement in the 1870s and 80s.

The increasingly elaborate recovery processes at the Washington Mine led to a significant financial downturn for the company, eventually prompting the closure of the mine in 1852.

== Zinc and Silver Mining Company ==
Following two years of closure, the mine was purchased by the Zinc and Silver Mining Company of New York in 1854 and renamed the Silver Hill Mine. By the late 1850s, it had fallen under the ownership of Franklin Osgood, a New York businessman who additionally owned the New Jersey–based Bergen Point Zinc Company. By 1860, many Irish and English immigrant miners had settled in the area, especially drawn from the mining districts of Cornwall. At least fourteen slaves worked at the mine, leased by the company from their owners.

Separators were planned to extract sphalerite from the ore, allowing for the elimination of zinc from smelting, but it is unknown if this process was ever implemented. By 1860, the company installed a second steam engine to power a series of buddles used for gravity separation. The East Shaft was expanded, with a diagonal shaft accessing both lodes at depths of 250 and 300 feet. Despite favorable ore concentrations at this depth, the mine likely entered a period of dormancy at some point prior to 1861.

=== Civil War era ===
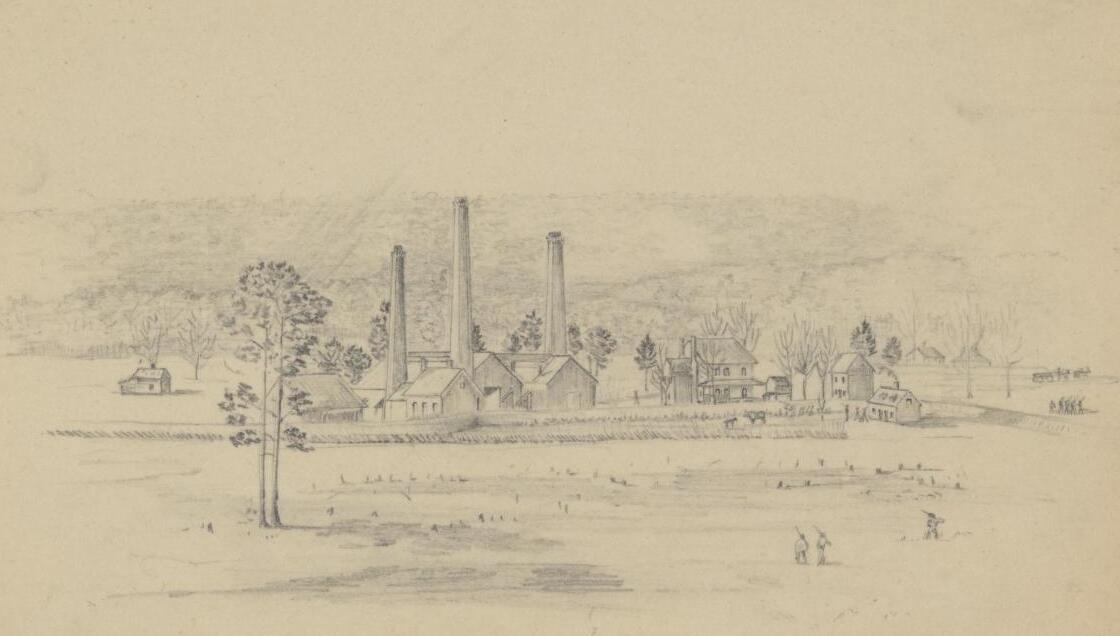
Sketch of the Petersburg Lead Works, 1861–1865

Following the secession of the Southern states in 1861 and the ensuing American Civil War, the nascent Confederate government began pursuing the acquisition of raw materials for the war effort, including significant quantities of lead. The Silver Hill Mine was one of two domestic sources of lead in the Confederacy, alongside more primary operations at Austinville, Virginia. During the war, lead was shipped via the North Carolina and Weldon Railroads to the Lead Works at Petersburg, Virginia. Although significant amounts of silver and small portions of gold were assayed from the ore, the silver was generally not recovered from the lead and remained in material used for bullet manufacture. Rail access to Petersburg was severed following the August 1864 Battle of Globe Tavern, but transport via wagon may have continued until the Fall of Petersburg on April 2, 1865. If wagon transport continued, the Silver Hill Mine may have been the only Confederate source of lead following the destruction of the Austinville mines in December 1864.

Richard W. Pascoe, a veteran Cornish-American miner, served as the superintendent of the Silver Hill Mining Company from June 1860 to at least December 1863. Initially traveling between Silver Hill and zinc mining operations in the Pennsylvania Lehigh Valley, Pascoe stayed in Virginia following secession. With the mine's previous owner on the northern side, George C. Irwin, a Maryland stockbroker and mining magnate who had previously negotiated the sale of Silver Hill to Osgood, served as president of the mine's company board during the war. Irwin was later investigated by Union authorities for an alleged sale of northern copper to the Confederacy, although he was ultimately cleared. Ownership of the mine was returned to Osgood following the war.

=== Post-war operations ===
Post-war documents describe an "unsettled period" in the years immediately following the war. By 1867, the mine had reached a depth of 500 feet. Ownership had been consolidated under the Silver Lead Mining Company of New York, which began raising investment funding after entering considerable debt pumping the mine of water. Despite this debt, expansions continued, and the mine had reached 650 feet in depth by 1872, with extracted galena concentrate shipped to New York for the manufacture of lead paint. The newfound commercial viability of zinc oxide and spelter led to expansions in the mine, as it became an important source of zinc to the Bergen Point Zinc Company. The previously discarded sphalerite may have been recovered for zinc extraction. Commercial zinc ore at the mine was exhausted by 1875.

Further shaft operations were dug in the late 1870s. The inclined portion of the East Shaft was connected to the surface, in the process discovering carbonate ore. The Symonds East shaft was expanded to 110 feet in depth, and the Symonds West was deepened to 210 feet, with a tunnel connecting to a level of the East Shaft at 250 feet. Although several other mines operated in Davidson County during the 1870s and 80s, Silver Hill was responsible for the majority of the county's output. Legal disputes over land ownership and expenses in mineral refinement prompted the closure of the mine in 1882.

== Later operations ==
Without active pumping operations, the Silver Hill Mine flooded. Operated by the West Prussian Mining Company from 1898 to 1900, the mine was briefly drained and surveyed. The main incline shaft was enlarged and repaired, and some galena and sphalerite was produced. Following another closure in 1900, machinery at the site was sold or discarded, and the mine entered another period of abandonment. The portions of the mine above 350 feet in depth were again drained in 1909, and from 1909 to 1911 shipped several hundred tons of zinc concentrate from the site, alongside 225 tons of a lead, silver, and gold concentrate.

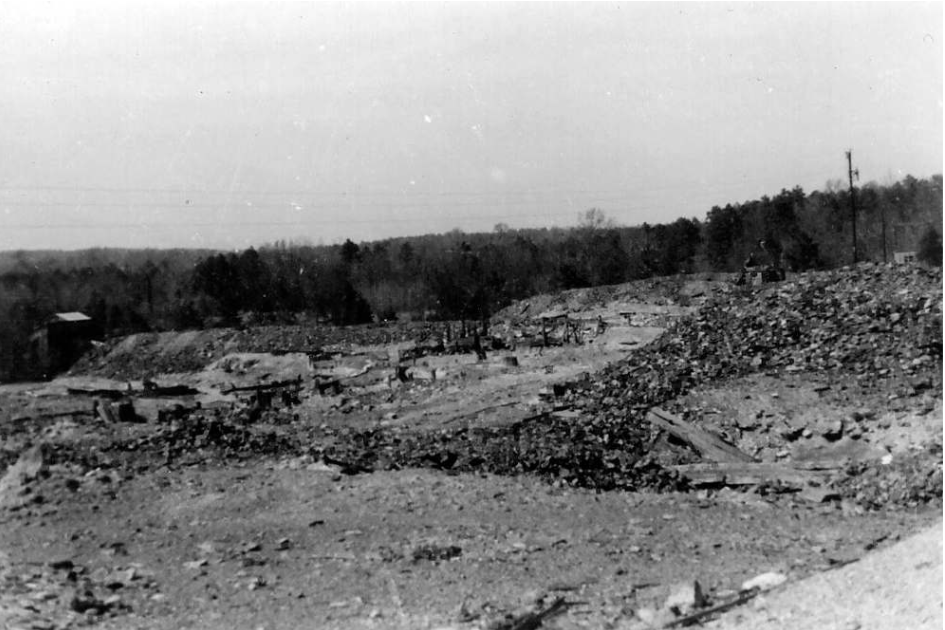
Silver Hill in the early 1940s, as pictured by a USBM survey

The mine was surveyed by the Bureau of Mines in the early 1940s, part of a larger portion to evaluate mineral resources important for production during the Second World War. In 1940, the Symonds West Shaft was retimbered, and the mine was drained to a depth of 250 feet. The Bertha Mineral Company, a subsidiary of New Jersey Zinc, drilled nineteen boreholes at the site during this period. Ultimately, no useful ore bodies were found and further exploration was discontinued.

The Tennessee Copper Company began extensive drilling efforts in the late 1950s, and announced the reopening of the mine in 1960. The Incline Shaft was expanded to a length of 1,700 feet (520 m), reaching a depth of 1,200 feet (370 m) total. A large drift was dug at the shaft bottom for drilling. Although 3,000 tons of ore were extracted by the company, it was deemed economically unviable and operations again ceased.

The Canadian Niagara Capital Corporation invested in an evaluation of the mine in 1987, partnering with the Ohio-based Silver Hill Mines Inc. to lease the land from its owners, the Stevenson family. Evaluations concluded a mineral worth of at least 30 million dollars ($85 million in 2025). Ore stockpiles at the site previously gathered by the Tennessee Copper Company were removed and processed, but no mining operations commenced.
