= Myrtle Smith Livingston =

American educator and playwright

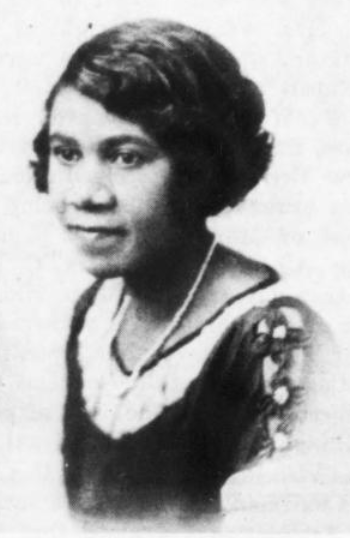
- Myrtle Smith Livingston, from a 1926 publication
- Born: Myrtle Athleen Smith; May 8, 1902; Holly Grove, Arkansas
- Died: July 15, 1974 (aged 72); Hawaii
- Occupations: Educator, playwright
- Notable work: For Unborn Children (play)

Myrtle Smith Livingston (May 8, 1902 – July 15, 1974) was an American educator and playwright.

== Early life ==
Myrtle Athleen Smith was born in Holly Grove, Arkansas, in 1902, the daughter of Isaac Samuel Smith and Lulu C. Hall Smith. She graduated from high school in 1920. She studied pharmacy at Howard University for two years (1920-1922), and earned a Colorado teaching certificate in 1924. She later earned a master's degree in 1940, from Columbia University.

== Career ==
Livingston taught physical education at Lincoln University in Missouri, beginning in 1928. She created many of the school's athletic opportunities for women students, including organized team sports. In 1936, she founded a dance program at Lincoln, the Orchesis Group. During World War II, she taught first aid classes in the community. She retired from Lincoln University in 1972.

Livingston wrote For Unborn Children, a short play about interracial marriage and lynching. In 1926, it won a prize in the Spingarn competition sponsored by The Crisis magazine. It was the first play published in The Crisis. In 1951, the play became the basis of an opera, The Barrier, by Jan Meyerowitz. "Although controversial in nature, the play presents a forum for discussing an issue that continues to haunt our society," note the editors of a recent complication of African-American dramas. She wrote another short play, Frances.

== Personal life ==
Myrtle A. Smith married William McKinley Livingston, a doctor, in 1925. She died in 1974, in Hawaii, aged 72 years. There is a Myrtle Smith Livingston Park, with tennis courts, on the campus of Lincoln University.
