= Gordontown, North Carolina =

- Unincorporated community
- Location within North Carolina Location within the United States
- Coordinates: 35°45′20″N 80°06′31″W
- Country: United States
- State: North Carolina
- County: Davidson
- Elevation: 778 ft (237 m)
- Time zone: UTC-5 (Eastern (EST))
  - Summer (DST): UTC-4 (EDT)
- Area code: 336
- GNIS feature ID: 985835

Gordontown (also Gordonton, Hanners Village, Hannersville) is an unincorporated community in Davidson County, North Carolina, United States.
