= First United Methodist Church (Leesville, Louisiana) =

Historic church in Louisiana, United States

- Leesville First Methodist Church
- U.S. National Register of Historic Places
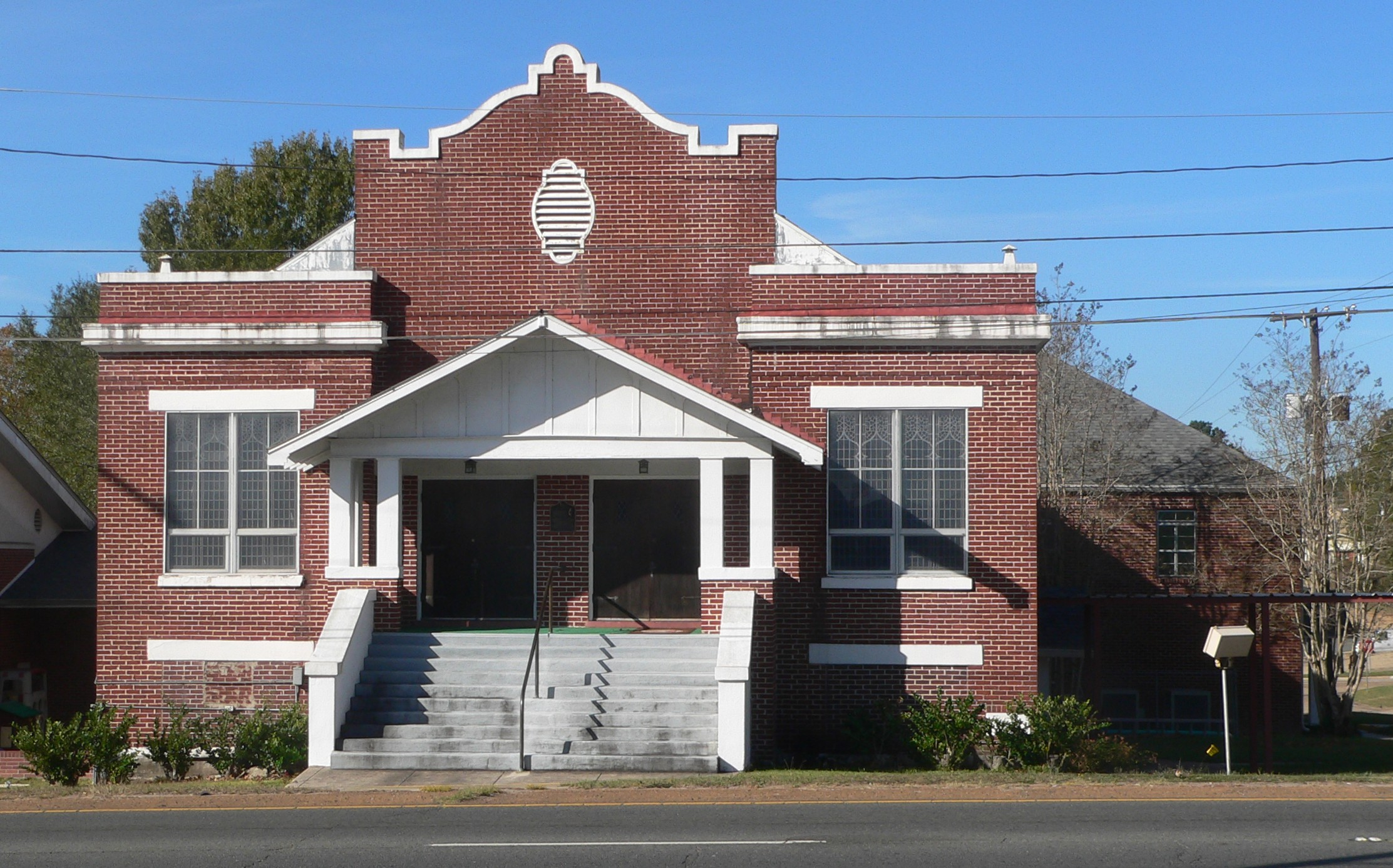

- Location within Louisiana Location within the United States
- Location: 202 N. Fifth St., Leesville, Louisiana
- Coordinates: 31.144444°N 93.264109°W
- Built: 1920
- Architectural style: Bungalow/craftsman, Mission/Spanish Revival
- NRHP reference No.: 01001491
- Added to NRHP: January 24, 2002

The First United Methodist Church is a church in Leesville, Louisiana. Located at 202 N. Fifth Street, the building was built in 1920 in a Bungalow style/Craftsman style, Mission style/Spanish Revival style and was added to the National Register of Historic Places in 2002.

The building is a T-shaped church which was built in 1920 and expanded in the 1950s. It is a two-story building, with the worship space upstairs and a high brick basement story holding offices and meeting rooms. The front facade of the building has "a pronounced Spanish mission style gable pierced by a curvaceous vent in the Baroque manner."

== See also ==
- Holly Grove Methodist Church, also NRHP-listed in Vernon Parish
- National Register of Historic Places listings in Vernon Parish, Louisiana
