= Friedberg, North Carolina =

- Unincorporated community
- Location within the state of North Carolina
- Coordinates: 35°59′41″N 80°17′41″W
- Country: United States
- State: North Carolina
- County: Davidson
- Elevation: 833 ft (254 m)
- Time zone: UTC-5 (Eastern (EST))
  - Summer (DST): UTC-4 (EDT)
- ZIP codes: 27295
- Area code: 336
- GNIS feature ID: 1002053

Friedberg is an unincorporated community located in Davidson County, North Carolina, United States. Located on both sides of the county line, Friedberg is historically associated with the Moravian Church and is home to Friedberg Moravian Church, one of the earliest Moravian congregations established in the region.

== History ==
Friedberg was settled in the 1750s by Moravian colonists expanding from nearby Wachovia settlements such as Salem. In 1773, Friedberg Moravian Church was organized as one of the southernmost Moravian congregations of the period. The community grew around the church, which continues to serve as a religious and cultural center. In 1767, a schoolhouse was constructed in the community, known at the time as the South Fork Settlement. By the early 1800s, the congregation members at Friedberg had begun to follow more English practices, especially relating to land division.

The area is also historically linked to Adam Spach, an early settler who built a fortified stone house in the mid-18th century to protect his family against attacks from local Indian tribes. The remains of the Adam Spach Rock House are preserved as a historical site and are listed on the National Register of Historic Places.

== Geography ==
Friedberg is located in northern Davidson County, near the boundary with Forsyth County, in the Piedmont region of North Carolina. The community lies just south of Winston-Salem and forms part of the larger Piedmont Triad area. The landscape consists of rolling hills typical of the central North Carolina Piedmont, with predominantly rural surroundings and small residential developments. Friedberg is centered around Friedberg Church Road and Old Salisbury Road, where the historic Friedberg Moravian Church is situated, serving as a local landmark and community focal point.

== Historic sites ==
- Friedberg Moravian Church (1773) — one of the oldest Moravian congregations in North Carolina.
- Adam Spach Rock House (1774) — ruins of a fortified stone dwelling built by early settler Adam Spach, listed on the National Register of Historic Places.
