= 1944 United States presidential election in North Carolina =

- November 7, 1944

All 14 North Carolina votes to the Electoral College

Nominee	Franklin D. Roosevelt	Thomas E. Dewey
Party	Democratic	Republican
Home state	New York	New York
Running mate	Harry S. Truman	John W. Bricker
Electoral vote	14	0
Popular vote	527,399	263,155
Percentage	66.71%	33.29%
County results
Roosevelt
50–60%
60–70%
70–80%
80–90%
90–100%
Dewey
50–60%
60–70%
70–80%
President before election
Franklin D. Roosevelt
Democratic
Elected President
Franklin D. Roosevelt
Democratic

The 1944 United States presidential election in North Carolina took place on November 7, 1944, as part of the 1944 United States presidential election. North Carolina voters chose 14 representatives, or electors, to the Electoral College, who voted for president and vice president.

As a former Confederate state, North Carolina had a history of Jim Crow laws, disfranchisement of its African-American population and dominance of the Democratic Party in state politics. However, unlike the Deep South, the Republican Party had sufficient historic Unionist white support from the mountains and northwestern Piedmont to gain one-third of the statewide vote total in most general elections, where turnout was higher than elsewhere in the former Confederacy due substantially to the state's early abolition of the poll tax in 1920. Like Virginia, Tennessee and Oklahoma, the relative strength of Republican opposition meant that North Carolina did not have statewide white primaries, although certain counties did use the white primary. A rapid move following disenfranchisement to a completely “lily-white” state GOP also helped maintain Republican support.

In 1928, anti-Catholicism in the Outer Banks and growing middle-class urban Republicanism in Piedmont cities turned North Carolina to GOP nominee Herbert Hoover, but this was sharply and severely reversed with the coming of the Great Depression. With the South having the highest unemployment in the nation and blaming its fate upon the North and Wall Street, exceptionally heavy support was given to Democratic nominee Franklin D. Roosevelt in 1932 and 1936 everywhere except in a few rock-ribbed Republican mountain bastions. Nevertheless, there was virtually no change to the state's social structure during the New Deal, and the conservative “Shelby Dynasty” was strong enough to prevent any populist challenge so much as developing. Additionally, the state was among the least isolationist and strongly supported aid to Britain during the early phase of World War II, while the absence of a statewide white primary meant local response to the landmark court case of Smith v. Allwright was generally calm. However, the precarious health of incumbent President Franklin D. Roosevelt produced strong Southern opposition to vice-president Henry A. Wallace, who was viewed as a dangerous liberal throughout the region. Initially the South attempted to have former Supreme Court Justice James F. Byrnes replace Wallace, but Byrnes was unacceptable because of his lapsed Catholicism to the northern Catholic urban bosses, and also to the party's union backers. Consequently, Missouri Senator Harry S. Truman became Roosevelt's running mate.

Polls were not taken in the state, but less than a week before the poll there were appeals to state Democrats to not support FDR for a fourth term.

== Results ==
1944 United States presidential election in North Carolina
Party	Candidate	Votes	%
Democratic	Franklin D. Roosevelt (inc.)	527,399	66.71%
Republican	Thomas E. Dewey	263,155	33.29%
Total votes		790,554	100%

=== Results by county ===
1944 United States presidential election in North Carolina by county
County	Franklin Delano Roosevelt Democratic		Thomas Edmund Dewey Republican		Margin	
County	%	#	%	#	%	#
Martin	97.07%	4,408	2.93%	133	94.14%	4,275
Bertie	96.20%	3,142	3.80%	124	92.41%	3,018
Greene	95.72%	2,528	4.28%	113	91.44%	2,415
Northampton	95.28%	3,470	4.72%	172	90.55%	3,298
Pitt	94.53%	8,556	5.47%	495	89.06%	8,061
Hertford	94.11%	1,996	5.89%	125	88.21%	1,871
Halifax	94.08%	6,989	5.92%	440	88.15%	6,549
Edgecombe	93.79%	6,762	6.21%	448	87.57%	6,314
Franklin	93.21%	3,967	6.79%	289	86.42%	3,678
Hoke	91.76%	1,782	8.24%	160	83.52%	1,622
Warren	91.11%	2,480	8.89%	242	82.22%	2,238
Granville	90.82%	3,215	9.18%	325	81.64%	2,890
Lenoir	90.46%	5,253	9.54%	554	80.92%	4,699
Nash	89.64%	7,577	10.36%	876	79.27%	6,701
Wilson	89.39%	6,480	10.61%	769	78.78%	5,711
Chowan	88.78%	1,314	11.22%	166	77.57%	1,148
Scotland	88.67%	2,372	11.33%	303	77.35%	2,069
Vance	88.62%	4,110	11.38%	528	77.23%	3,582
Gates	87.84%	1,105	12.16%	153	75.68%	952
Anson	87.54%	3,582	12.46%	510	75.07%	3,072
Robeson	86.68%	7,278	13.32%	1,118	73.37%	6,160
Onslow	86.23%	2,711	13.77%	433	72.46%	2,278
Craven	85.50%	4,872	14.50%	826	71.01%	4,046
Jones	85.27%	1,221	14.73%	211	70.53%	1,010
Richmond	85.19%	5,394	14.81%	938	70.37%	4,456
Union	83.72%	5,729	16.28%	1,114	67.44%	4,615
Currituck	81.95%	1,049	18.05%	231	63.91%	818
Wake	81.87%	18,050	18.13%	3,996	63.75%	14,054
Lee	81.02%	3,448	18.98%	808	62.03%	2,640
Beaufort	80.60%	4,706	19.40%	1,133	61.19%	3,573
Person	80.51%	2,507	19.49%	607	61.01%	1,900
Pender	79.71%	1,732	20.29%	441	59.41%	1,291
Caswell	79.63%	1,923	20.37%	492	59.25%	1,431
Duplin	79.18%	5,464	20.82%	1,437	58.35%	4,027
Camden	78.91%	722	21.09%	193	57.81%	529
Dare	78.86%	966	21.14%	259	57.71%	707
Columbus	78.65%	5,717	21.35%	1,552	57.30%	4,165
Perquimans	78.30%	960	21.70%	266	56.61%	694
Washington	78.19%	1,782	21.81%	497	56.38%	1,285
Bladen	77.67%	2,542	22.33%	731	55.33%	1,811
Durham	77.57%	12,763	22.43%	3,690	55.14%	9,073
New Hanover	76.99%	9,467	23.01%	2,829	53.99%	6,638
Cumberland	76.66%	6,615	23.34%	2,014	53.32%	4,601
Wayne	76.49%	6,228	23.51%	1,914	52.98%	4,314
Cleveland	75.61%	8,170	24.39%	2,636	51.21%	5,534
Pasquotank	74.71%	2,540	25.29%	860	49.41%	1,680
Rockingham	74.33%	8,755	25.67%	3,024	48.65%	5,731
Hyde	74.10%	924	25.90%	323	48.20%	601
Mecklenburg	73.34%	25,950	26.66%	9,434	46.68%	16,516
Haywood	72.65%	7,755	27.35%	2,919	45.31%	4,836
Gaston	69.53%	13,744	30.47%	6,023	39.06%	7,721
Orange	69.06%	3,274	30.94%	1,467	38.11%	1,807
Carteret	69.02%	3,489	30.98%	1,566	38.04%	1,923
Buncombe	68.96%	20,878	31.04%	9,398	37.92%	11,480
Tyrrell	68.50%	611	31.50%	281	37.00%	330
Cabarrus	68.17%	9,064	31.83%	4,233	36.33%	4,831
Harnett	67.34%	6,579	32.66%	3,191	34.68%	3,388
Johnston	65.19%	8,282	34.81%	4,423	30.37%	3,859
Alamance	64.86%	9,184	35.14%	4,976	29.72%	4,208
Guilford	64.45%	23,495	35.55%	12,962	28.89%	10,533
Pamlico	64.30%	1,295	35.70%	719	28.60%	576
McDowell	63.96%	4,008	36.04%	2,258	27.93%	1,750
Iredell	63.21%	8,358	36.79%	4,864	26.43%	3,494
Rowan	62.38%	9,721	37.62%	5,862	24.76%	3,859
Forsyth	62.07%	16,390	37.93%	10,014	24.15%	6,376
Chatham	61.33%	3,856	38.67%	2,431	22.67%	1,425
Rutherford	61.10%	7,379	38.90%	4,698	22.20%	2,681
Jackson	60.40%	4,109	39.60%	2,694	20.80%	1,415
Surry	60.02%	7,679	39.98%	5,116	20.03%	2,563
Catawba	58.45%	10,146	41.55%	7,211	16.91%	2,935
Swain	58.37%	2,110	41.63%	1,505	16.74%	605
Polk	58.24%	2,340	41.76%	1,678	16.48%	662
Moore	58.22%	3,711	41.78%	2,663	16.44%	1,048
Graham	58.21%	1,889	41.79%	1,356	16.43%	533
Yancey	57.88%	3,301	42.12%	2,402	15.76%	899
Montgomery	57.58%	2,665	42.42%	1,963	15.17%	702
Transylvania	57.29%	3,019	42.71%	2,251	14.57%	768
Caldwell	55.39%	5,419	44.61%	4,365	10.77%	1,054
Henderson	55.18%	5,679	44.82%	4,613	10.36%	1,066
Stokes	54.90%	4,110	45.10%	3,376	9.80%	734
Alleghany	54.77%	1,810	45.23%	1,495	9.53%	315
Brunswick	54.02%	2,346	45.98%	1,997	8.04%	349
Burke	53.72%	6,795	46.28%	5,855	7.43%	940
Macon	53.22%	2,855	46.78%	2,510	6.43%	345
Lincoln	53.12%	4,168	46.88%	3,678	6.25%	490
Davidson	50.03%	9,455	49.97%	9,445	0.05%	10
Clay	49.64%	1,245	50.36%	1,263	-0.72%	-18
Cherokee	49.59%	2,582	50.41%	2,625	-0.83%	-43
Ashe	49.09%	4,363	50.91%	4,524	-1.81%	-161
Stanly	47.48%	5,499	52.52%	6,083	-5.04%	-584
Randolph	45.61%	7,277	54.39%	8,678	-8.78%	-1,401
Watauga	44.84%	3,214	55.16%	3,954	-10.32%	-740
Alexander	43.44%	2,282	56.56%	2,971	-13.12%	-689
Davie	41.13%	2,266	58.87%	3,244	-17.75%	-978
Sampson	41.04%	4,220	58.96%	6,062	-17.91%	-1,842
Wilkes	37.99%	5,587	62.01%	9,121	-24.03%	-3,534
Yadkin	36.00%	2,470	64.00%	4,392	-28.01%	-1,922
Madison	34.30%	2,291	65.70%	4,388	-31.40%	-2,097
Mitchell	24.29%	1,024	75.71%	3,192	-51.42%	-2,168
Avery	20.87%	838	79.13%	3,178	-58.27%	-2,340

==== Counties that flipped from Democratic to Republican ====
- Alexander
- Ashe
- Clay
- Cherokee
- Davie
- Stanly
- Randolph

== Analysis ==
North Carolina was won by Roosevelt with 66.71 percent of the popular vote, against Governor Thomas E. Dewey (R–New York), running with Governor John Bricker with 33.29 percent.

This was nonetheless a decline of over fifteen percentage points upon Roosevelt's 1940 performance, reflecting the significant isolationism in Appalachia, alongside developing hostility towards Democratic liberalism on racial issues. As of the 2024 presidential election, this is the last election in which the following counties voted for a Democratic presidential candidate: Catawba, Davidson and Henderson.
