= Holly Grove School (Stevens Creek, Arkansas) =

- U.S. National Register of Historic Places
- Location within Arkansas Location within the United States
- Nearest city: Stevens Creek, Arkansas
- Coordinates: 35°22′41″N 91°37′20″W
- Area: less than one acre
- Built: 1939
- Built by: Works Progress Administration
- Architectural style: WPA Craftsman architecture
- MPS: White County MPS
- NRHP reference No.: 91001309
- Added to NRHP: July 13, 1992

The Holly Grove School was a historic school building in rural White County, Arkansas. It was located northwest of Bald Knob, north of the junction of Stanley and Honeysuckle Roads. It was a single story Craftsman-style structure, fashioned out of local fieldstone and brick in 1939 by a crew of the National Youth Administration, a Depression-era jobs program. It was one of the better examples of NYA construction.

The building was listed on the National Register of Historic Places in 1992. It was destroyed by fire in 2014.

== See also ==
- National Register of Historic Places listings in White County, Arkansas
