= Holly Grove Methodist Church =

Historic church in Louisiana, United States

- U.S. National Register of Historic Places
- Location within Louisiana Location within the United States
- Nearest city: Anacoco, Louisiana
- Coordinates: 31°13′43″N 93°21′26″W
- Area: 5 acres (2.0 ha)
- Built: 1894, 1915
- NRHP reference No.: 80001766
- Added to NRHP: October 8, 1980

Holly Grove Methodist Church is a historic church in Vernon Parish, Louisiana which was built in 1894 and enlarged in 1915. It was added to the National Register of Historic Places in 1980.

The church was founded in the 1830s and was the beginning of Methodism in the extreme western part of Louisiana. Its building was deemed significant as "the only remaining example in Vernon Parish of the type of simple frame churches which characterized much of rural Louisiana at the turn of the century. It is also the parish's oldest extant church structure. Holly Grove, therefore, is a landmark in the sparse architectural history of this comparatively recently settled parish."

The church is isolated in a forested area. In 1980 the church was accessible only by a 1.3 miles (2.1 km) dirt road.

== See also ==
- First United Methodist Church (Leesville, Louisiana), also NRHP-listed in Vernon Parish
- National Register of Historic Places listings in Vernon Parish, Louisiana
