= Holly Grove Historic District =

Historic district in Arkansas, United States

- U.S. National Register of Historic Places
- U.S. Historic district
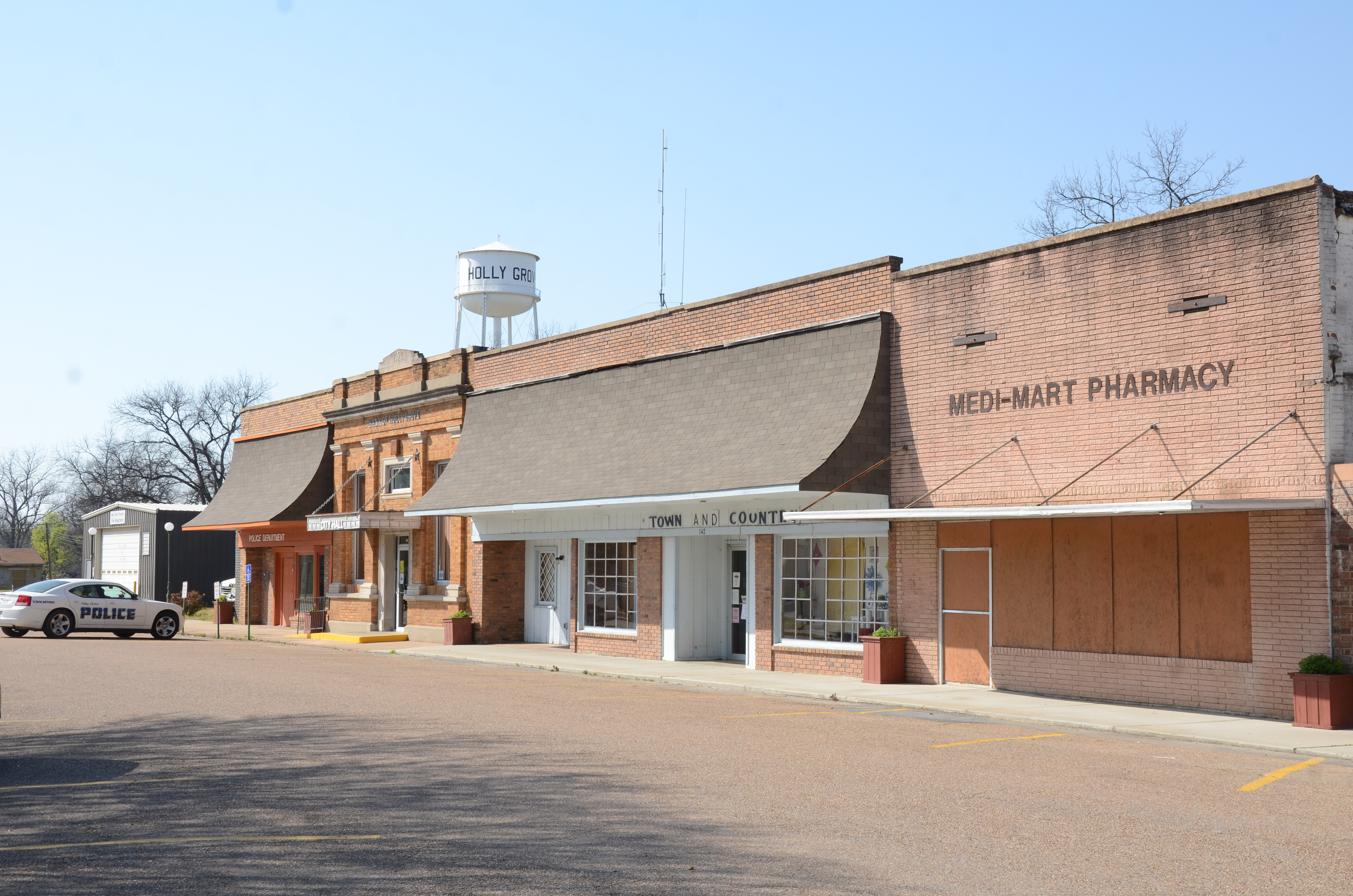

- Location within Arkansas Location within the United States
- Location: Main and Pine Sts., Holly Grove, Arkansas
- Coordinates: 34°35′44″N 91°12′4″W
- Area: 10 acres (4.0 ha)
- NRHP reference No.: 79000446
- Added to NRHP: February 2, 1979

The Holly Grove Historic District encompasses the historic central business district of Holly Grove, Arkansas. It covers about one block of Arkansas Highway 86, between Pine and Smith Streets, extending slightly in each direction beyond. The road is at this point divided by a median that formerly carried a railroad right of way, and was historically known as Main Street; the westbound lanes are now called Dr. Herd E. Stone Street, and the eastbound lanes Ralph Abramson Street. The district includes a collection of one and two-story brick buildings, most with vernacular commercial styling typical of the 1920s. The town grew as a railroad town beginning in the 1870s, its success spurred in part by a successful railroad tie-making business.

The district, which includes twenty buildings, was listed on the National Register of Historic Places in 1979.

== See also ==
- National Register of Historic Places listings in Monroe County, Arkansas
