= Edmond Ellison Smart House =

Historic house in Louisiana, United States

- U.S. National Register of Historic Places
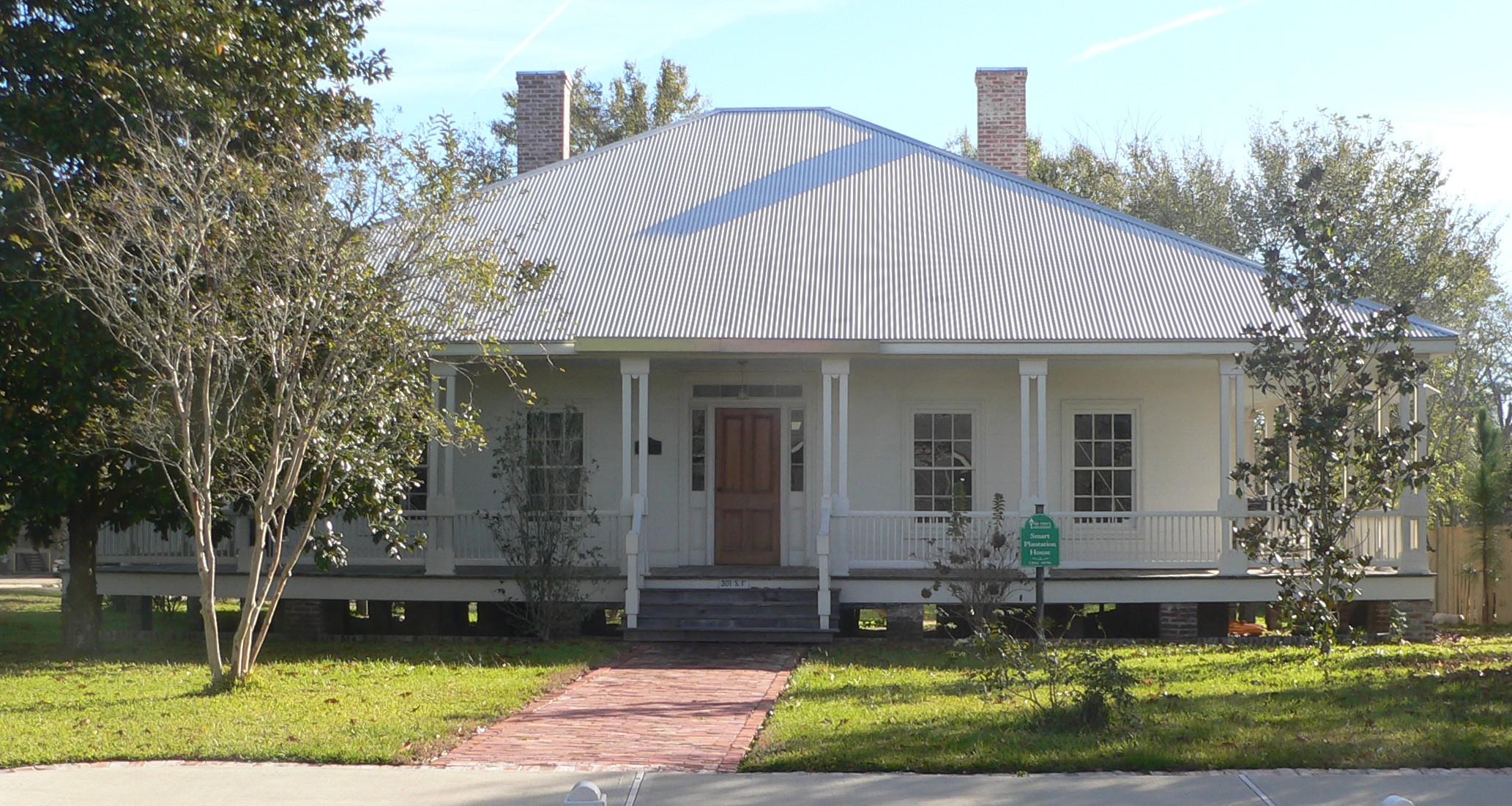

- Location within Louisiana Location within the United States
- Location: 301 S. 1st. St., Leesville, Louisiana
- Coordinates: 31.141805°N 93.259332°W
- Built: c. 1870
- Architectural style: Greek Revival, Italianate
- NRHP reference No.: 02001636
- Added to NRHP: December 31, 2002

The Edmond Ellison Smart House, in Leesville in Vernon Parish, Louisiana, is believed to have been built in about 1870. It was listed on the National Register of Historic Places in 2002.

It was the longtime home of Dr. Edmond Ellison Smart (d.1908), founder of the town of Leesville.

The house's architectural style is not clear, but in general terms is consistent with Greek Revival and Italianate influences. The house has a broad hip roof and a gallery which encircled the house, but which is now enclosed at the rear.
