= Silver Hill, North Carolina =

- Unincorporated community
- Location within the state of North Carolina
- Coordinates: 35°42′22.71″N 80°12′25.16″W
- Country: United States
- State: North Carolina
- County: Davidson
- Elevation: 692 ft (211 m)
- Time zone: Eastern (EST)
  - Summer (DST): EDT
- GNIS feature ID: 1024302

Silver Hill is a populated place in Davidson County, North Carolina, United States.

== History ==
Since the discovery in 1838 of silver, lead and zinc, these metals were mined at the Washington mine within the area in Davidson County. It was one of the only silver mines in North Carolina.

The company that owned the mine was known as the "Washington Mining Company" and then the "Silver Hill Mining Company"; it was largely controlled by a group of New York investors who also controlled the company town where workers and their families lived. During the American Civil War, lead from the mine was used to manufacture Confederate bullets.

The historic Beck's Reformed Church Cemetery is located in the area.
