= Holly Grove, Arkansas =

- City
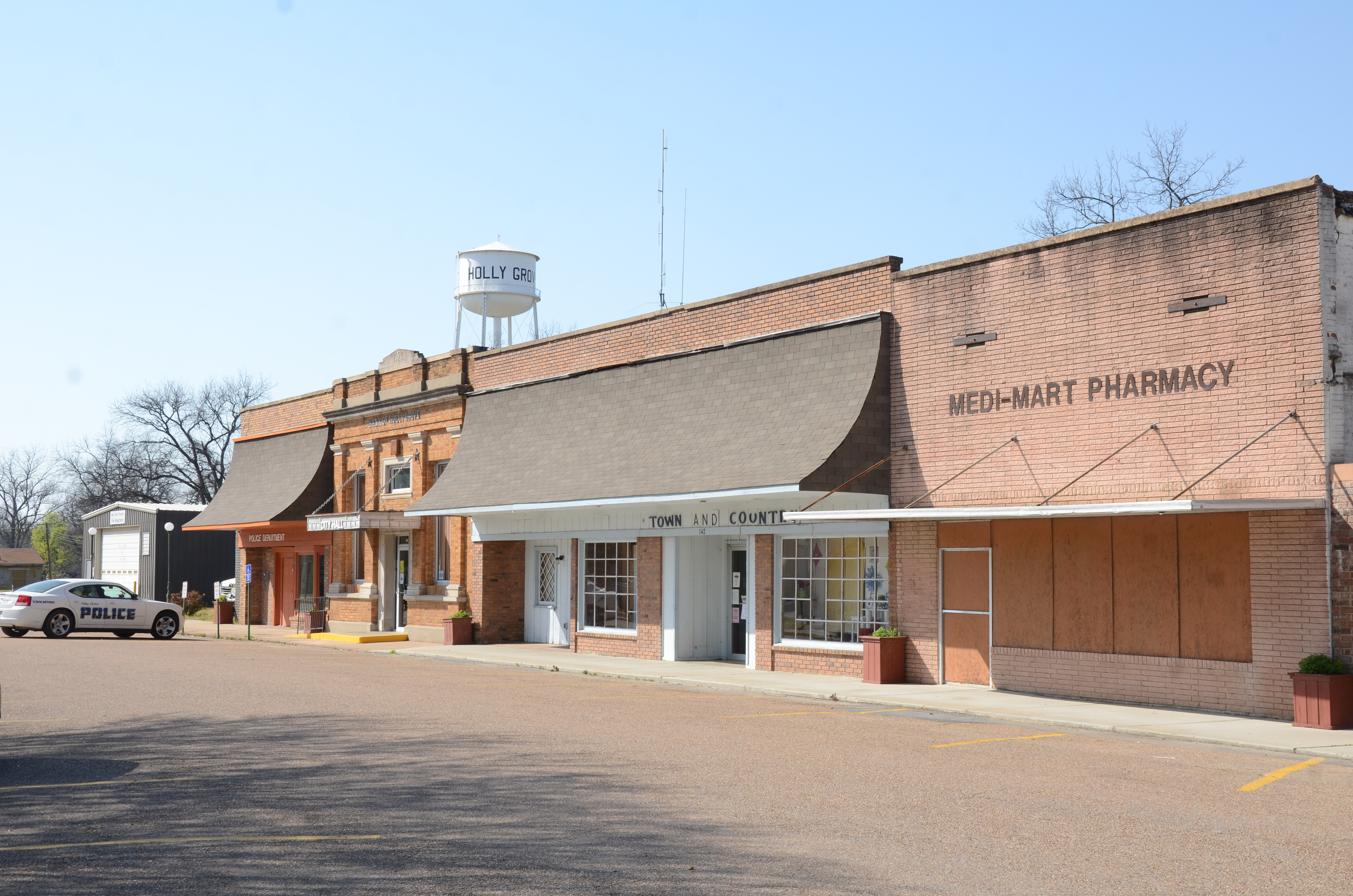
- Holly Grove Historic District

- Location in Monroe County, Arkansas
- Coordinates: 34°36′01″N 91°11′46″W
- Country: United States
- State: Arkansas
- County: Monroe

Area
  - Total: 1.02 sq mi (2.64 km^{2})
  - Land: 1.00 sq mi (2.59 km^{2})
  - Water: 0.019 sq mi (0.05 km^{2})
- Elevation: 177 ft (54 m)

Population (2020)
  - Total: 460
  - Estimate (2025): 433 ▼
  - Density: 459.5/sq mi (177.42/km^{2})
- Time zone: UTC-6 (Central (CST))
  - Summer (DST): UTC-5 (CDT)
- ZIP code: 72069
- Area code: 870
- FIPS code: 05-32800
- GNIS feature ID: 2404714

Holly Grove is a city in Monroe County, Arkansas, United States. As of the 2020 census, the city population was 460, down from 602 in 2010.

The town started as a plantation community which was a suburb of Lawrenceville, which was the seat of Monroe County until 1857. However, the construction through Holly Grove in 1872 of the Arkansas Central Railway, later the Arkansas Midland Railroad, caused Lawrenceville to shrink and Holly Grove to grow. The town was officially incorporated in 1876.

== Geography ==
Holly Grove is located south of the center of Monroe County 11 miles (18 km) southwest of Clarendon, the county seat, and 18 miles (29 km) west of Marvell.

According to the United States Census Bureau, the city has a total area of 1.0 square mile (2.6 km^{2}), of which 0.02 square miles (0.05 km^{2}), or 1.86%, are water.

== Demographics ==
Historical population
Census	Pop.	Note	%±
1880	161		—
1890	353		119.3%
1900	391		10.8%
1910	536		37.1%
1920	977		82.3%
1930	741		−24.2%
1940	755		1.9%
1950	761		0.8%
1960	672		−11.7%
1970	840		25.0%
1980	754		−10.2%
1990	675		−10.5%
2000	722		7.0%
2010	602		−16.6%
2020	460		−23.6%
2025 (est.)	433	▼	−5.9%
U.S. Decennial Census

=== Racial and ethnic composition ===
Holly Grove city, Arkansas – Racial and ethnic composition Note: the US Census treats Hispanic/Latino as an ethnic category. This table excludes Latinos from the racial categories and assigns them to a separate category. Hispanics/Latinos may be of any race.
Race / Ethnicity (NH = Non-Hispanic)	Pop 2000	Pop 2010	Pop 2020	% 2000	% 2010	% 2020
White alone (NH)	193	88	29	26.73%	14.62%	6.30%
Black or African American alone (NH)	524	504	425	72.58%	83.72%	92.39%
Native American or Alaska Native alone (NH)	0	0	1	0.00%	0.00%	0.22%
Asian alone (NH)	1	0	1	0.14%	0.00%	0.22%
Native Hawaiian or Pacific Islander alone (NH)	0	0	2	0.00%	0.00%	0.43%
Other race alone (NH)	0	0	0	0.00%	0.00%	0.00%
Mixed race or Multiracial (NH)	3	3	2	0.42%	0.50%	0.43%
Hispanic or Latino (any race)	1	7	0	0.14%	1.16%	0.00%
Total	722	602	460	100.00%	100.00%	100.00%

=== 2020 census ===
As of the 2020 United States census, there were 460 people, 266 households, and 170 families residing in the city.

=== 2000 census ===
As of the census of 2000, there were 722 people, 301 households, and 176 families residing in the city. The population density was 1,023.0 inhabitants per square mile (395.0/km^{2}). There were 347 housing units at an average density of 491.7 per square mile (189.8/km^{2}). The racial makeup of the city was 26.87% White, 72.58% Black or African American, 0.14% Asian, and 0.42% from two or more races. 0.14% of the population were Hispanic or Latino of any race.

There were 301 households, out of which 26.9% had children under the age of 18 living with them, 24.9% were married couples living together, 28.2% had a female householder with no husband present, and 41.2% were non-families. 37.9% of all households were made up of individuals, and 24.9% had someone living alone who was 65 years of age or older. The average household size was 2.40 and the average family size was 3.17.

In the city, the population was spread out, with 29.4% under the age of 18, 5.7% from 18 to 24, 23.1% from 25 to 44, 19.8% from 45 to 64, and 22.0% who were 65 years of age or older. The median age was 39 years. For every 100 females, there were 77.0 males. For every 100 females age 18 and over, there were 70.0 males.

The median income for a household in the city was $15,294, and the median income for a family was $17,232. Males had a median income of $24,444 versus $18,438 for females. The per capita income for the city was $10,047. About 37.7% of families and 42.6% of the population were below the poverty line, including 61.3% of those under age 18 and 31.2% of those age 65 or over.

== Education ==
Holly Grove is within the Clarendon School District. On July 1, 2004, the Holly Grove School District was merged into the Clarendon School District.

== Notable people ==
- Myrtle Smith Livingston (1902–1974), American educator and playwright
