= Hollygrove, West Virginia =

- Unincorporated community
- Location within West Virginia and the United States Hollygrove (the United States)
- Coordinates: 38°11′25″N 81°23′45″W
- Country: United States
- State: West Virginia
- County: Kanawha
- Elevation: 646 ft (197 m)

Population (2000)
  - Total: 55
- Time zone: UTC-5 (Eastern (EST))
  - Summer (DST): UTC-4 (EDT)
- ZIP codes: 25103
- Area code: 304 or 681
- GNIS ID: 1540400
- Hollygrove was once called tent city. Coal miners lived in tents and worked hard to provide for what little they made. The miners had enough and started the coal mine wars. The term "red neck" comes from the miners wearing red bandanas around their necks during the war. The bull moose special was the train that ran the coal out of the town. One night they mounted a Gatling gun on the train and opened fire on the miners.

Hollygrove is an unincorporated community in Kanawha County, West Virginia, United States. As of the 2020 census, Hollygrove had a population of 113.
