= Joseph H. Kurth Jr. House =

- Kurth, Joseph H., Jr. House
- U.S. National Register of Historic Places
- Location within Louisiana
- Nearest city: Leesville, Louisiana
- Coordinates: 31°20′11″N 93°09′57″W
- Area: 5.8 acres (2.3 ha)
- Built: 1920
- Built by: Vernon Parish Lumber Company
- Architectural style: Bungalow/craftsman
- NRHP reference No.: 04000071
- Added to NRHP: September 17, 2004

The Joseph H. Kurth, Jr., House, in Vernon Parish, Louisiana near Leesville, Louisiana, was built in 1920. It was listed on the National Register of Historic Places in 2004.

It is a large, one-and-one-half-story frame house, a vernacular example of the bungalow style. It was built on the main street of Kurthwood, a lumber company town, but almost all the rest of the town has disappeared since, leaving the house in a rural, wooded setting.

It is a rare surviving artifact of "the immensely important early twentieth century lumber industry of Vernon Parish". The parish was created in 1871 and saw some lumbering of long leaf pine in the late 1800s, then a lumbering boom from 1900 to 1929 when Kurthwood was closed and dismantled.

It is located at 351 Louisiana Highway 465.
