= Holly Grove, Davidson County, North Carolina =

Holly Grove, North Carolina
- Unincorporated community
- Location within North Carolina Location within the United States
- Coordinates: 35°49′02″N 80°11′29″W
- Country: United States
- State: North Carolina
- County: Davidson
- Elevation: 768 ft (234 m)
- Time zone: UTC-5 (Eastern (EST))
  - Summer (DST): UTC-4 (EDT)
- Area code: 336
- GNIS feature ID: 986944

Holly Grove (also Conrad Hill, McKee) is an unincorporated community in Davidson County, North Carolina, United States.
