= Davidson County, North Carolina =

County in North Carolina, United States

- County
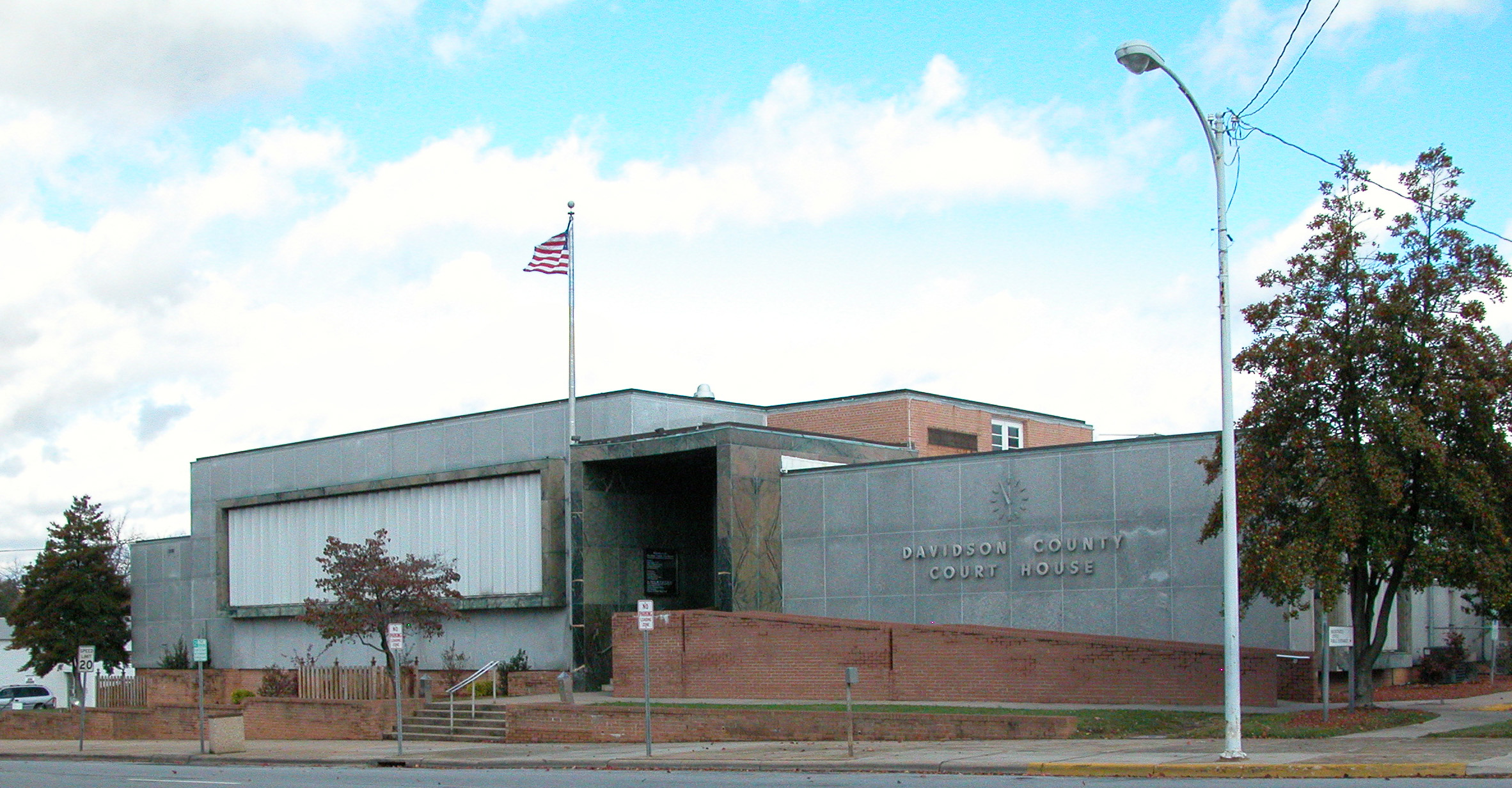
- Davidson County Courthouse in Lexington

- Flag Seal Logo

- Location within the U.S. state of North Carolina
- Interactive map of Davidson County, North Carolina
- Coordinates: 35.80°N 80.21°W
- Country: United States
- State: North Carolina
- Founded: 1822
- Named for: William Lee Davidson
- Seat: Lexington
- Largest community: Thomasville

Area
  - Total: 567.70 sq mi (1,470.3 km^{2})
  - Land: 553.18 sq mi (1,432.7 km^{2})
  - Water: 14.52 sq mi (37.6 km^{2}) 2.56%

Population (2020)
  - Total: 168,930
  - Estimate (2025): 180,182 ▲
  - Density: 305.38/sq mi (117.91/km^{2})
- Time zone: UTC−5 (Eastern)
  - Summer (DST): UTC−4 (EDT)
- Congressional district: 6th
- Website: www.co.davidson.nc.us

Davidson County is a county located in the U.S. state of North Carolina. As of the 2020 census, its population was 168,930. Its county seat is Lexington, and its largest community is Thomasville. Davidson County is included in the Winston-Salem, NC metropolitan statistical area, which is also included in the Greensboro–Winston-Salem–High Point, NC combined statistical area. Parts of Davidson County are in the Yadkin Valley AVA.

== History ==
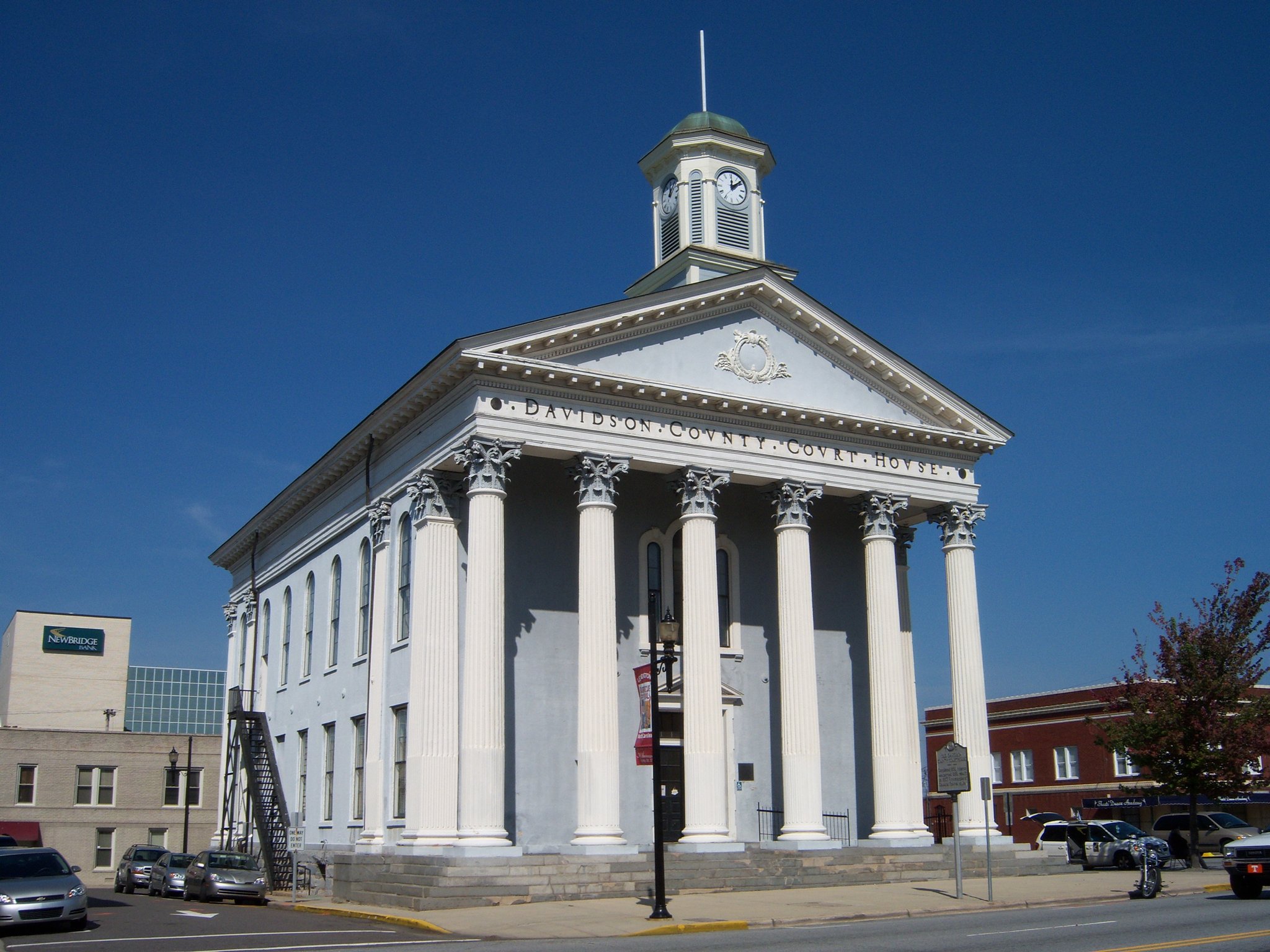
Old Davidson County Courthouse in Lexington

The original North Carolina county of this name was created in 1786 in what was then the far western portion of North Carolina, with its county seat at Nashville and a territory covering most of what is now Middle Tennessee. When Tennessee was established as a separate state in 1796, this county became Davidson County, Tennessee.

The current North Carolina county was formed in 1822 from Rowan County. It was named after Brigadier General William Lee Davidson, an American Revolutionary War general killed at the Battle of Cowan's Ford on the Catawba River in 1781.

The Silver Hill Mine, the first silver mine in the United States, opened in Davidson County in 1839.

In 1911, a new county called Piedmont County was proposed, with High Point as its county seat, to be created from Guilford, Davidson, and Randolph Counties. Many people appeared at the Guilford County courthouse to oppose the plan, vowing to go to the state legislature to protest. The state legislature voted down the plan in February 1911.

== Geography ==
According to the U.S. Census Bureau, the county has a total area of 567.70 square miles (1,470.3 km^{2}), of which 14.52 square miles (37.6 km^{2}) (2.56%) are covered by water.

Davidson County is located entirely within the Piedmont region of central North Carolina. The Piedmont consists of gently rolling terrain frequently broken by hills or shallow valleys formed by rivers and streams. Exceptions to this terrain are the Uwharrie Mountains in the county's western and southwestern sections. The Uwharries are the oldest mountain range in North America, and at one time they rose to nearly 20,000 feet (6,100 m) above sea level, but time has worn them down to little more than high hills; yet due to the relative flatness of the surrounding countryside, they still rise 250–500 feet (76–152 m) above their base. The highest point in the Uwharries - and the highest point in Davidson County - is High Rock Mountain in the county's southwestern corner. It has an elevation of 1,119 feet (341 m) above mean sea level.

=== National protected area ===
- Uwharrie National Forest (part)

=== State and local protected areas ===
- Boone's Cave Park
- Lake Thom-A-Lex Park
- Uwharrie Game Land (part)
- Yadkin River Game Land (part)

=== Major water bodies ===
- Abbotts Creek
- Badin Lake
- High Rock Lake
- Lake Thom-A-Lex
- South Potts Creek
- Tuckertown Reservoir
- Yadkin River

=== Adjacent counties ===
- Forsyth County – north
- Guilford County – northeast
- Randolph County – east
- Montgomery County – south
- Stanly County – southwest
- Rowan County – southwest
- Davie County – west

=== Major highways ===
- I-85
- I-285
- US 29
- US 52
- US 64
- US 70
- NC 8
- NC 47
- NC 49
- NC 62
- NC 68
- NC 109
- NC 150

=== Major infrastructure ===
- Davidson County Airport
- Lexington Station

== Demographics ==
Historical population
Census	Pop.	Note	%±
1830	13,389		—
1840	14,606		9.1%
1850	15,320		4.9%
1860	16,601		8.4%
1870	17,414		4.9%
1880	20,333		16.8%
1890	21,702		6.7%
1900	23,403		7.8%
1910	29,404		25.6%
1920	35,201		19.7%
1930	47,865		36.0%
1940	53,377		11.5%
1950	62,244		16.6%
1960	79,493		27.7%
1970	95,627		20.3%
1980	113,162		18.3%
1990	126,677		11.9%
2000	147,246		16.2%
2010	162,878		10.6%
2020	168,930		3.7%
2025 (est.)	180,182	▲	6.7%
U.S. Decennial Census; 1790–1960 1900–1990; 1990–2000 2010 2020

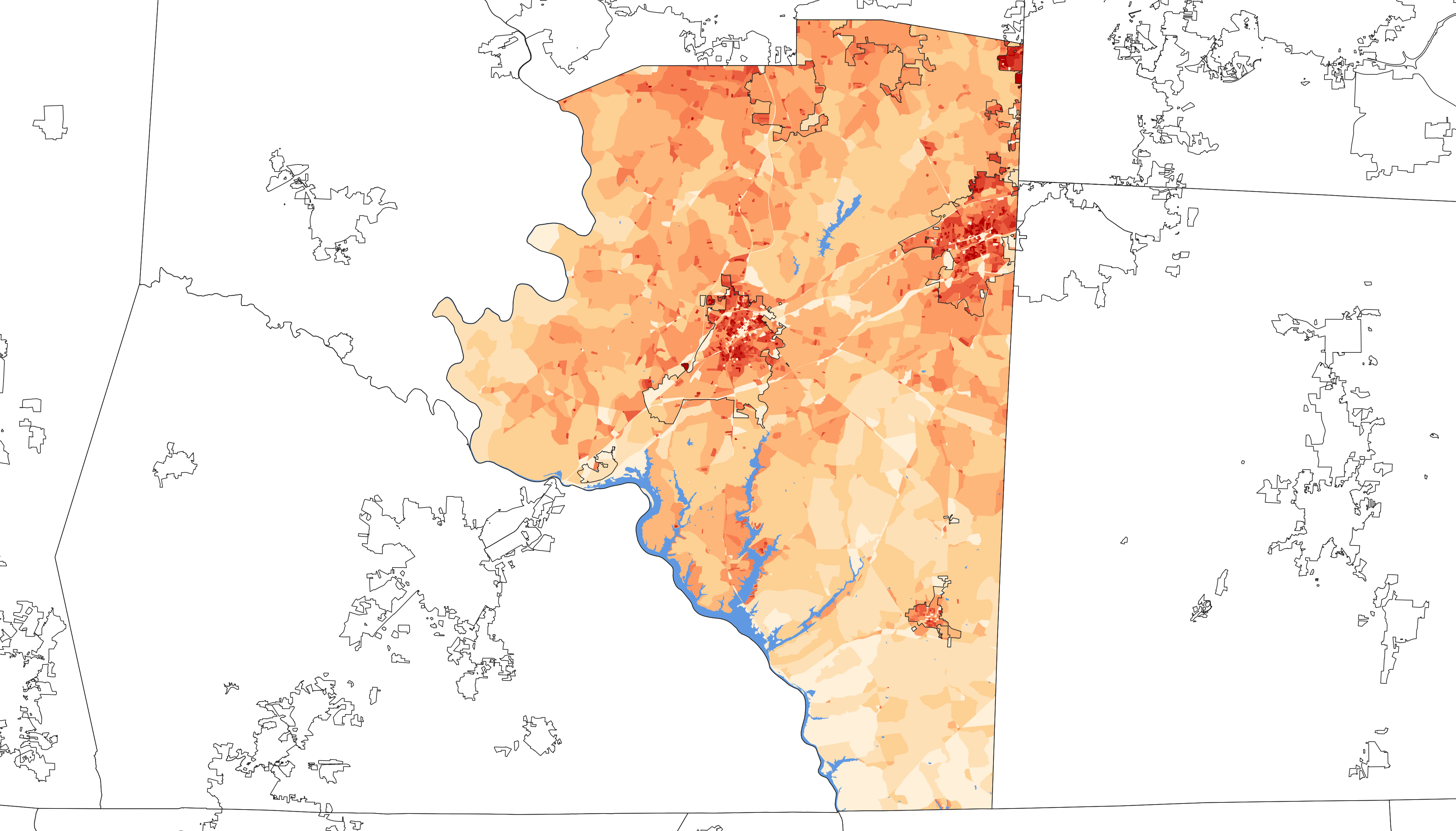
2020 population density of Davidson County NC by census block

=== Racial and ethnic composition ===
Davidson County, North Carolina – Racial and ethnic composition Note: the US Census treats Hispanic/Latino as an ethnic category. This table excludes Latinos from the racial categories and assigns them to a separate category. Hispanics/Latinos may be of any race.
Race / Ethnicity (NH = Non-Hispanic)	Pop 1980	Pop 1990	Pop 2000	Pop 2010	Pop 2020	% 1980	% 1990	% 2000	% 2010	% 2020
White alone (NH)	100,919	112,937	126,158	133,486	129,487	89.18%	89.15%	85.68%	81.95%	76.65%
Black or African American alone (NH)	11,209	12,275	13,389	14,269	15,839	9.91%	9.69%	9.09%	8.76%	9.38%
Native American or Alaska Native alone (NH)	206	383	466	634	665	0.18%	0.30%	0.32%	0.39%	0.39%
Asian alone (NH)	141	457	1,188	1,957	2,440	0.12%	0.36%	0.81%	1.20%	1.44%
Native Hawaiian or Pacific Islander alone (NH)	x	x	5	26	43	x	x	0.00%	0.02%	0.03%
Other race alone (NH)	65	23	137	220	491	0.06%	0.02%	0.09%	0.14%	0.29%
Mixed race or Multiracial (NH)	x	x	1,138	1,878	6,063	x	x	0.77%	1.15%	3.59%
Hispanic or Latino (any race)	622	602	4,765	10,408	13,902	0.55%	0.48%	3.24%	6.39%	8.23%
Total	113,162	126,677	147,246	162,878	168,930	100.00%	100.00%	100.00%	100.00%	100.00%

=== 2020 census ===
As of the 2020 census, 168,930 people, 68,126 households, and 49,037 families were residing in the county. The median age was 43.1 years; 21.8% of residents were under the age of 18 and 19.0% of residents were 65 years of age or older. For every 100 females there were 95.3 males, and for every 100 females age 18 and over there were 92.7 males.

There were 68,126 households in the county, of which 29.7% had children under the age of 18 living in them. Of all households, 49.8% were married-couple households, 17.2% were households with a male householder and no spouse or partner present, and 26.5% were households with a female householder and no spouse or partner present. About 26.6% of all households were made up of individuals and 12.4% had someone living alone who was 65 years of age or older.

There were 74,536 housing units, of which 8.6% were vacant. Among occupied housing units, 71.9% were owner-occupied and 28.1% were renter-occupied. The homeowner vacancy rate was 1.4% and the rental vacancy rate was 7.1%.

The racial makeup of the county was 78.1% White, 9.5% Black or African American, 0.6% American Indian and Alaska Native, 1.5% Asian, <0.1% Native Hawaiian and Pacific Islander, 4.6% from some other race, and 5.7% from two or more races. Hispanic or Latino residents of any race comprised 8.2% of the population.

52.3% of residents lived in urban areas, while 47.7% lived in rural areas.

=== 2010 census ===
At the 2010 census, 149,331 people, 58,156 households, and 42,512 families were living in the county. The population density was 267 people per square mile (103 people/km^{2}). The 62,432 housing units had an average density of 113 units per square mile (44 units/km^{2}). The racial makeup of the county was 84.05% White, 11.14% African American, 0.37% Native American, 0.82% Asian, 1.67% from other races, and 0.94% from two or more races. About 3.24% of the population were Hispanics or Latinos of any race.

Of the 58,156 households, 32.7% had children under 18 living with them, 58.0% were married couples living together, 10.8% had a female householder with no husband present, and 26.9% were not families. About 22.9% of all households were made up of individuals, and 8.8% had someone living alone who was 65 or older. The average household size was 2.50 and the average family size was 2.92.

In the county, the age distribution was 24.3% under 18, 7.6% from 18 to 24, 31.2% from 25 to 44, 24.1% from 45 to 64, and 12.8% who were 65 or older. The median age was 37 years. For every 100 females, there were 96.0 males. For every 100 females 18 and over, there were 93.7 males.

The median income for a household in the county was $38,640, and for a family was $46,241. Males had a median income of $31,287 versus $23,622 for females. The per capita income for the county was $18,703. About 7.00% of families and 10.10% of the population were below the poverty line, including 13.3% of people under 18 and 12.1% of those 65 or over.

== Government and politics ==
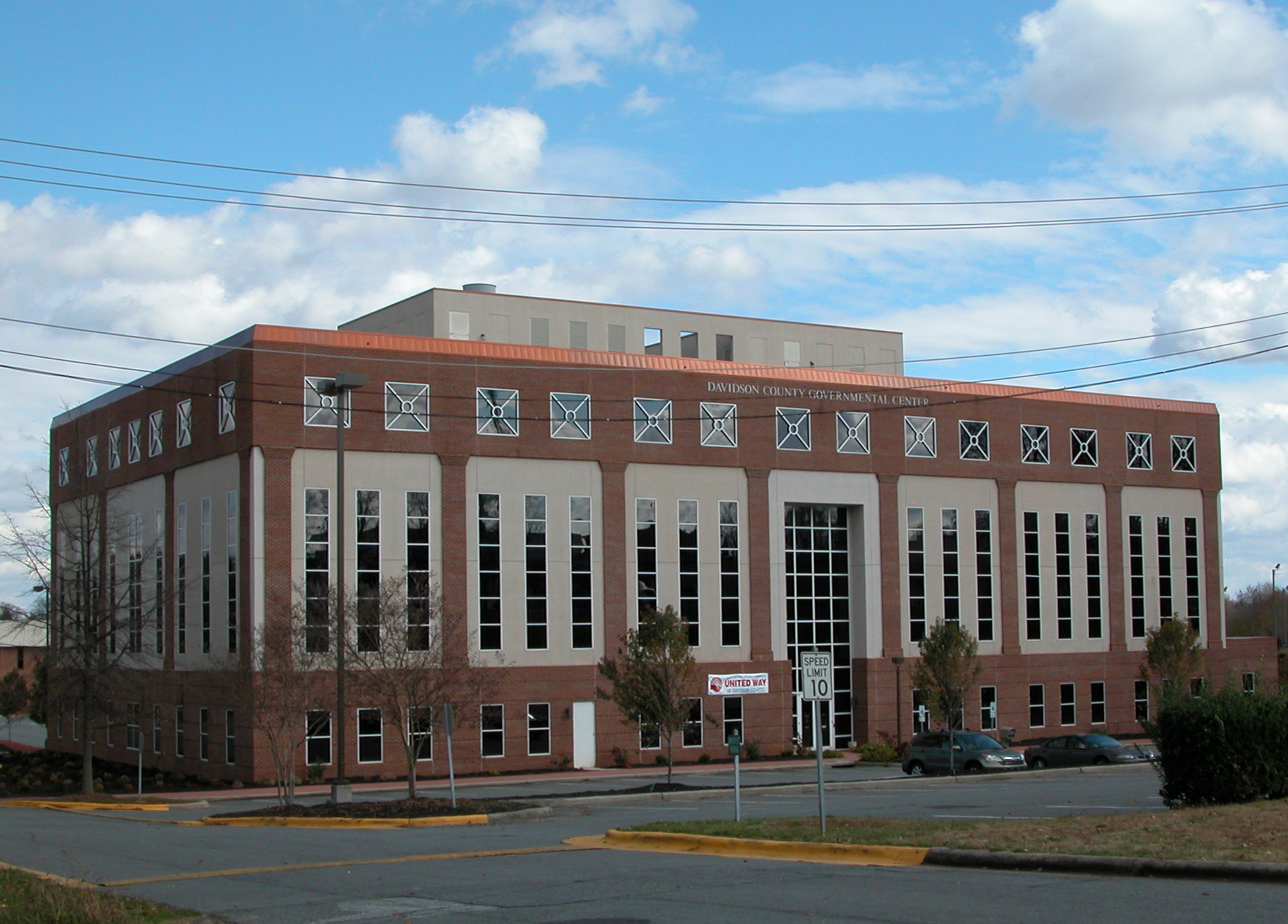
Davidson County Governmental Center in Lexington

Davidson County was one of the first areas of North Carolina to turn Republican, doing so long before other areas of conservative White voters shifted away from the Democrats. No Democratic presidential nominee has carried the county since Franklin D. Roosevelt defeated Thomas E. Dewey by a mere 10 votes out of almost 19,000 in 1944. It was one of only 13 counties of 100 in the state to vote for Barry Goldwater over Lyndon Johnson in 1964, and the last Democrat to garner even one-third of the county's vote was Jimmy Carter in 1980.

United States presidential election results for Davidson County, North Carolina
Year	Republican		Democratic		Third party(ies)	
Year	No.	%	No.	%	No.	%
1880	1,864	51.00%	1,781	48.73%	10	0.27%
1884	2,097	52.46%	1,900	47.54%	0	0.00%
1888	2,346	52.53%	2,023	45.30%	97	2.17%
1892	1,837	42.97%	1,928	45.10%	510	11.93%
1896	2,375	53.00%	2,072	46.24%	34	0.76%
1900	2,329	55.49%	1,823	43.44%	45	1.07%
1904	2,054	50.11%	2,017	49.21%	28	0.68%
1908	2,340	52.12%	2,126	47.35%	24	0.53%
1912	1,509	29.26%	2,484	48.16%	1,165	22.59%
1916	2,801	51.04%	2,675	48.74%	12	0.22%
1920	5,960	55.41%	4,797	44.59%	0	0.00%
1924	6,227	48.69%	6,507	50.88%	56	0.44%
1928	8,960	63.19%	5,220	36.81%	0	0.00%
1932	6,051	39.04%	9,292	59.95%	157	1.01%
1936	7,656	41.38%	10,844	58.62%	0	0.00%
1940	6,978	38.63%	11,084	61.37%	0	0.00%
1944	9,445	49.97%	9,455	50.03%	0	0.00%
1948	8,539	49.32%	7,991	46.15%	784	4.53%
1952	14,299	56.67%	10,931	43.33%	0	0.00%
1956	16,178	61.83%	9,987	38.17%	0	0.00%
1960	18,797	58.90%	13,118	41.10%	0	0.00%
1964	17,292	55.73%	13,735	44.27%	0	0.00%
1968	16,678	46.57%	7,594	21.20%	11,544	32.23%
1972	24,875	74.79%	7,691	23.12%	696	2.09%
1976	18,813	51.05%	17,859	48.46%	183	0.50%
1980	22,794	59.56%	14,579	38.10%	896	2.34%
1984	30,471	72.55%	11,469	27.31%	61	0.15%
1988	28,374	68.11%	13,215	31.72%	73	0.18%
1992	24,869	50.01%	16,462	33.11%	8,394	16.88%
1996	24,797	58.75%	13,593	32.21%	3,817	9.04%
2000	35,387	67.99%	16,199	31.12%	461	0.89%
2004	42,075	70.72%	17,191	28.89%	230	0.39%
2008	45,419	66.23%	22,433	32.71%	729	1.06%
2012	49,383	69.62%	20,624	29.07%	928	1.31%
2016	54,317	72.56%	18,109	24.19%	2,430	3.25%
2020	64,658	73.05%	22,636	25.57%	1,220	1.38%
2024	67,959	72.72%	24,150	25.84%	1,343	1.44%

Davidson County is a member of the regional Piedmont Triad Council of Governments.

Davidson County gained national attention when Gerald Hege, sheriff from 1994 to 2003, became a minor celebrity for his unconventional prisoner treatment methods.

=== County commissioners ===
Office	Holder	Party	Term expires
County commissioner (chair)	Todd Yates	Republican	2028
County commissioner (vice chair)	Karen Watford	Republican	2026
County commissioner	Chris Elliott	Republican	2026
County commissioner	Fred McClure	Republican	2028
County commissioner	Matt Mizell	Republican	2026
County commissioner	Steve Shell	Republican	2026
County commissioner	Tripp Kester	Republican	2028

== Education ==
The majority of Davidson County is within Davidson County Schools school district, but there are portions in the Lexington City Schools and the Thomasville City Schools school districts. The Lexington district has the majority of Lexington and some unincorporated areas, and the Thomasville district has the central part of Thomasville. The Davidson County Schools district is one of the county's largest employers.

Davidson County is also served by Davidson-Davie Community College, a comprehensive community college that is a member school of the North Carolina Community College System. Davidson-Davie Community College was chartered in 1958 as an Industrial Education Center designed to provide adults with the education and skills needed to move from an agricultural to a manufacturing-based economy.

In 1965, the institution was chartered as Davidson County Community College. The associate in arts and associate in science degrees were added to the existing associate in applied science degree, diploma, and certificate programs. University transfer courses were added in 1966. In 1997, the college participated in the Comprehensive Articulation Agreement that allows college transfer students to move easily to the 16 UNC schools, as well as many independent college and universities. Presently, the Davidson Campus has grown to 11 buildings and two emergency-services training facilities on about 97 acres (390,000 m^{2}).

== Attractions ==
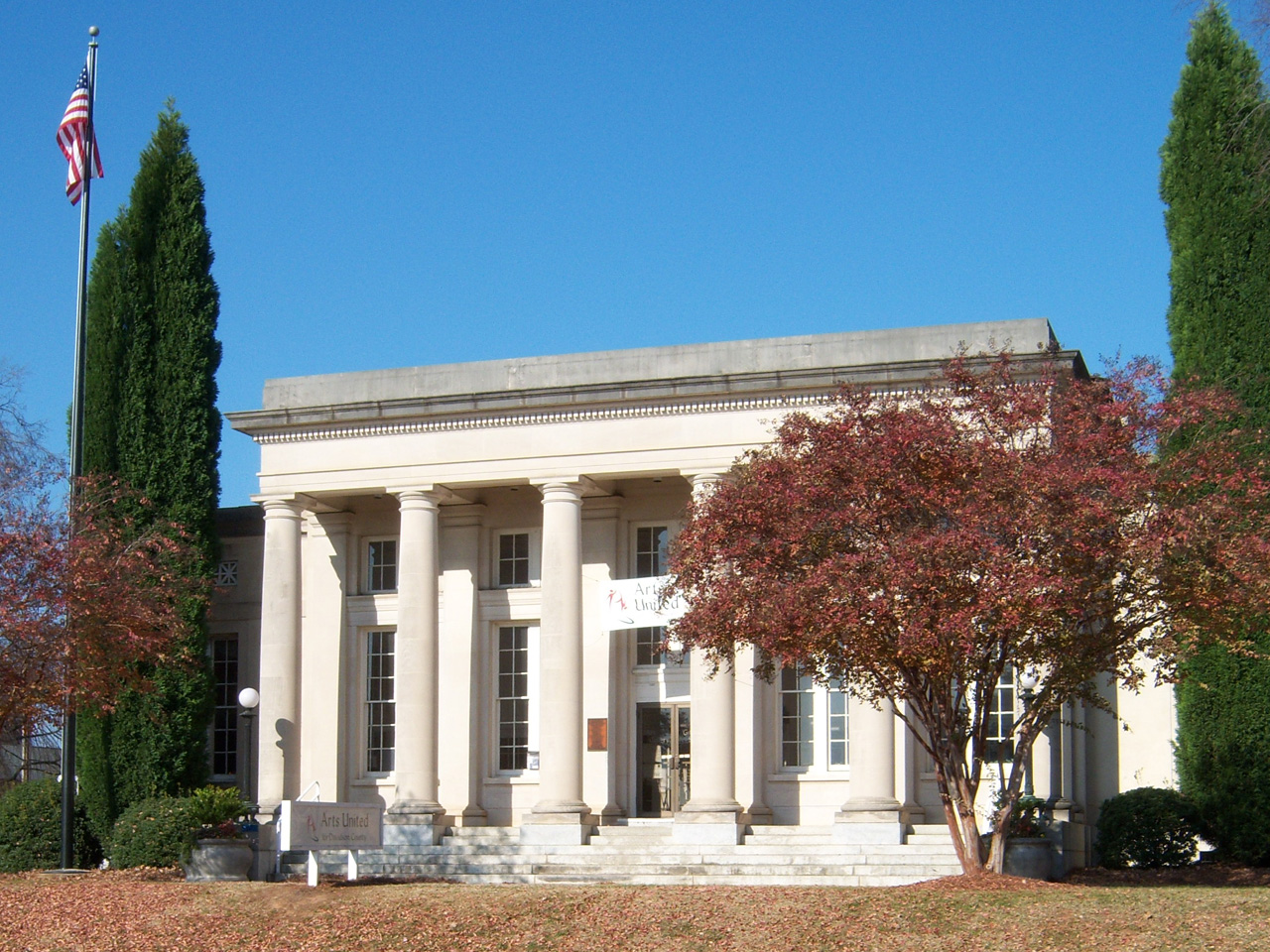
Arts United of Davidson County

=== Festivals ===
One of the county's most famous attractions is the yearly Lexington Barbecue Festival, held in the city of Lexington during October, bringing in over 100,000 visitors from all over the Southeastern U.S. Also, an annual Davidson County Agriculture Fair is held in September. Thomasville hosts an annual Everybody's Day Festival, the longest-running festival in the state. The Southeastern Old Threshers Reunion is held every year at the Denton Farmpark.

=== Landmarks ===
Many year-long attractions are available in Davidson County, some of which include Historic Uptown Lexington, which consists of the Davidson County Historical Museum located in the old courthouse. Alongside the Yadkin River sits Boone's Cave Park, where according to legend, a young Daniel Boone and his family once lived. Other attractions include Denton Farm Park, Walter Johnson Camp and Conference Center, and the North Carolina Vietnam Veterans Memorial. The historic Wil-Cox Bridge spanning the Yadkin River has been preserved for pedestrian traffic and is now part of the Yadkin River Park. The Big Chair in Thomasville is also a major landmark.

=== Art ===
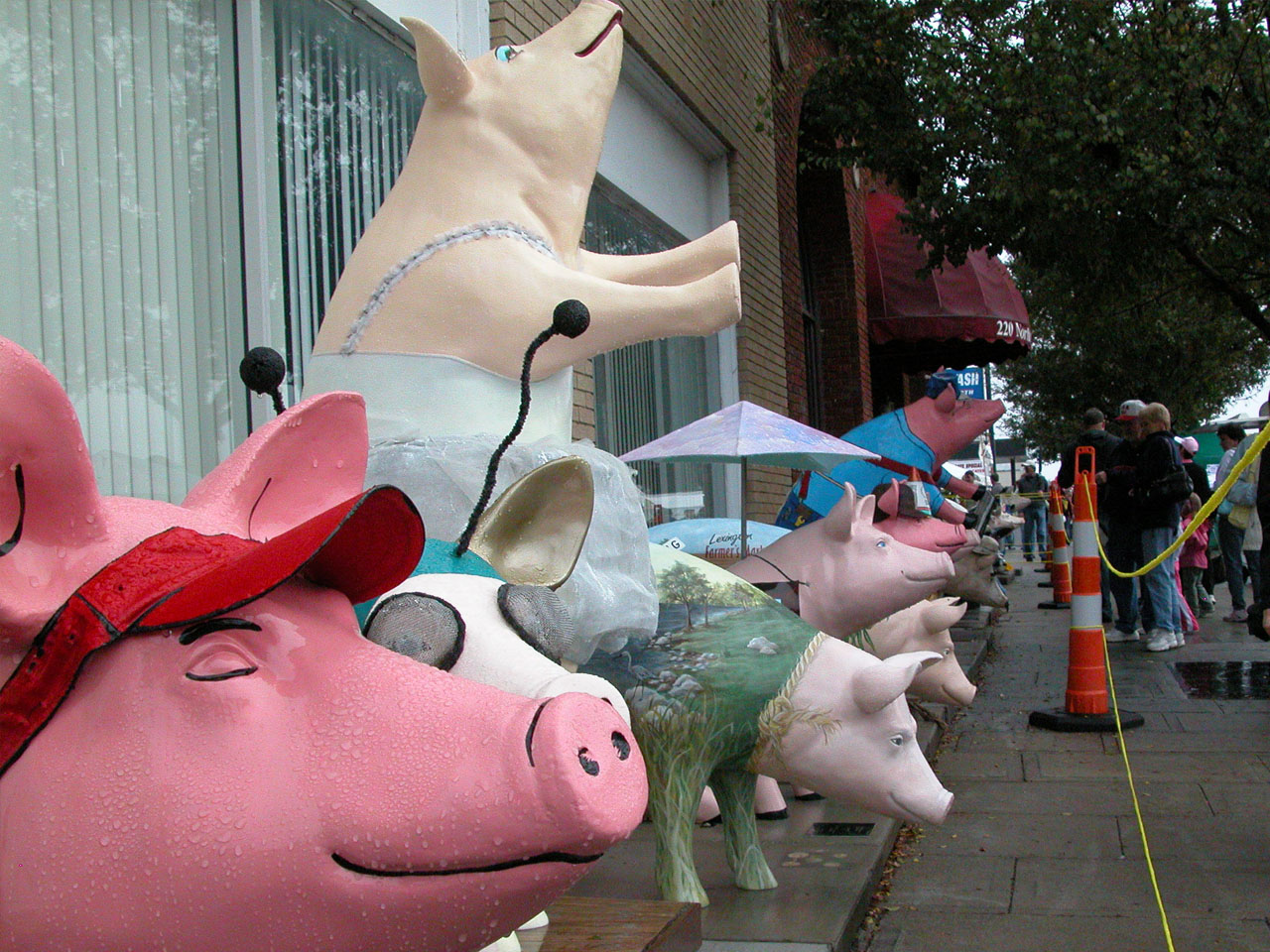
Pigs on Parade during the Lexington Barbecue Festival

Pigs in the City, an art initiative held each summer in Lexington, attracts tens of thousands of visitors.

In 2005, Davidson County Community College and the City of Thomasville formed a partnership for the creation of the Thomasville Artisan Center. This art studio allowed the college to reinvigorate its associate in fine arts degree, and offered both university transfer classes and adult community-interest classes in painting, drawing, and sculpting. The Artisan Center is part of the college's Thomasville Education Center complex, which is part of the college's outreach to the community. The college has a second campus in Davie County in the city of Mocksville, as well as the Uptown Lexington Education Center, located within a few blocks of the Arts Center of Davidson County and the historic Courthouse.

=== Barbecue ===
One of the two major styles of North Carolina barbecue originated in Lexington, the county seat and home to the annual Lexington Barbecue Festival. Therefore, many Lexington-style barbecue restaurants are found throughout the county.

=== Richard Childress ===
Davidson County is home to many supporting race fans and Richard Childress. It includes his personal Childress Vineyards and Richard Childress Racing Museum.

=== The Big Chair ===
Davidson County is also known for its oversized chair, the "Big Chair", located in central Thomasville; it is a symbol of Davidson County's furniture industry.

=== High Rock Lake ===
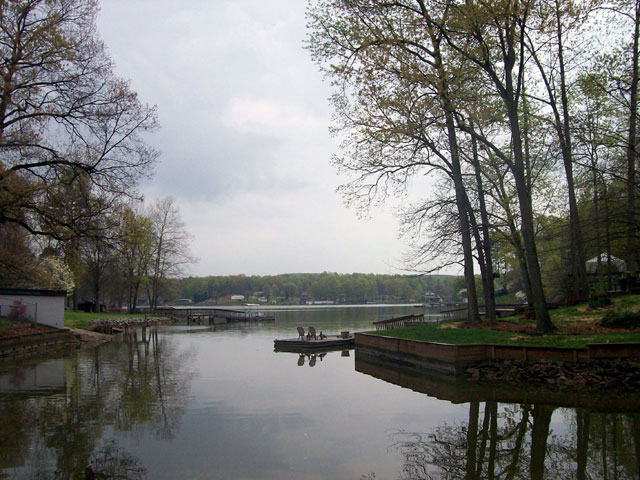
High Rock Lake

High Rock Lake is the northernmost of the Uwharrie Lakes and the second-largest lake in North Carolina behind Lake Norman. Its water surface covers 15,180 acres (61.4 km^{2}), with 365 miles (587 km) of shoreline. It begins at the confluence of the Yadkin River and the South Yadkin River. It has been the host of the Bassmaster Classic in 1994, 1995 and 1998. and is the site of frequent other local angling competitions. Lexington is just north of the Abbotts Creek section of the lake.

== Communities ==
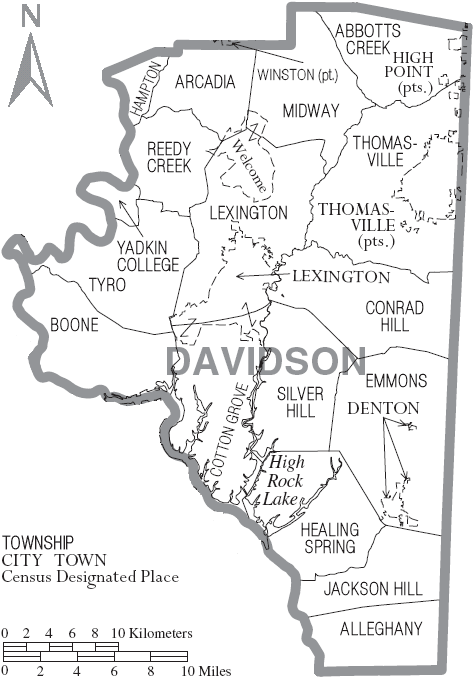
Map of Davidson County with municipal and township labels

=== Cities ===
- High Point (part)
- Lexington (county seat)
- Thomasville (largest community)

=== Towns ===
- Denton
- Midway
- Wallburg

=== Townships ===
- Abbotts Creek
- Alleghany
- Arcadia
- Boone
- Conrad Hill
- Cotton Grove
- Emmons
- Hampton
- Healing Spring
- Jackson Hill
- Lexington
- Midway
- Reedy Creek
- Silver Hill
- Thomasville
- Tyro
- Yadkin College

=== Census-designated places ===
- Southmont
- Tyro
- Welcome
- Yadkin College

=== Unincorporated communities ===
- Arcadia
- Churchland
- Friedberg
- Gordontown
- Holly Grove
- Reeds
- Silver Hill
- Silver Valley

== Notable people ==
- Nia Franklin, Miss America 2019, graduated from North Davidson High School in Welcome.
- Brady Hepner, actor, currently stars in the Netflix series The Waterfront. From Wallburg.
- Max Lanier and son Hal Lanier, both Major League Baseball players, are from Denton.
- Eddie Mathews, Hall of Fame baseball player, played for Thomasville in 1949 before going professional.
- Wilmer "Vinegar Bend" Mizell, professional baseball player for the Pirates and Cardinals, and a US congressman who served three terms (1930–1999) from the 5th Congressional District of North Carolina.
- Perry Tuttle, former NFL and CFL wide receiver, was born in Lexington.
- Shy Tuttle, defensive tackle for the Carolina Panthers, grew up in Midway.

== See also ==
- List of counties in North Carolina
- National Register of Historic Places listings in Davidson County, North Carolina
