= Holly Grove Site =

- U.S. National Register of Historic Places
- Nearest city: Sledge, Mississippi
- Area: 180 acres (73 ha)
- NRHP reference No.: 76001106
- Added to NRHP: October 21, 1976

The National Register of Historic Places contains a listing for a Holly Grove Site, also known as Beaver Dam Archeological Site or 22-Pa-524, which is a 180-acre (73 ha) archeological site near Sledge, Mississippi, in Panola County, Mississippi. It was listed on the National Register of Historic Places in 1976.

At least one other, different NRHP-listed archeological site is also named "Holly Grove": the site also known as Black Site or 22-Lf-539, in Leflore County, Mississippi.
