= Gerald Hege =

American retired law enforcement officer (born 1948)

Gerald Keith Hege, Sr. (born 1948) is an American retired law enforcement officer who served as the Sheriff of Davidson County, North Carolina from 1994 until 2004. A veteran of the Vietnam War, he became famous for his highly eccentric behavior as sheriff, his internationally known television show, and eventually for the charges of corruption that led to his resignation. He is a Republican, and a former head of the Davidson County Republican Party. Hege's management style as head of the Davidson County Republican Party sparked a rift that nearly split county Republicans. In 2017, Hege published his first novel, Deathbed Confessions. In 2018, the State of North Carolina expunged his criminal records.

== Early life ==
In 1970 Hege was hired as a sheriff's deputy by Davidson County Sheriff Fred Sink. Three years later he shot and killed a suspected burglar near Lexington. He left his job in 1974 after a fight with several inmates.

== Career as sheriff ==
Hege was elected sheriff in 1994 by a margin of 261 votes. One of his better-known campaign slogans was "When I am elected Sheriff, I will wear a uniform every day and there will be no deals for anybody." After his election, all Davidson County Sheriff's cars were fitted with a front license plate proclaiming "NO DEALS" in large block letters.

His personal patrol vehicle was a 1995 Chevrolet Impala with a Chevrolet Corvette engine and nitrous oxide tanks. His department lost its insurance coverage when he boasted that he had driven the vehicle at speeds of up to 140 miles per hour (230 km/h). The car was referred to as "The Spider Car" because of a custom paint job featuring a Black Widow Spider and the letters "DDT." The windows of this and all other patrol cars of the force were tinted dark black.

Hege took Buford Pusser and Joe Arpaio as role models. Hege ordered all deputies to dress in paramilitary fatigues and combat boots; Hege dressed this way himself, despite the tradition of business attire for Davidson County sheriffs. Hege reinstated the use of chain gang prisoner labor. He also removed the television sets and books (except for the Bible) from the county jail. The jail was repainted in pink with weeping blue teddy bears. Prisoners also wore color coordinated jumpsuits to identify their offense: Blue for misdemeanors, green for sex offenders, and orange for felons. The jumpsuits were striped in the old-fashioned manner as opposed to the modern solid color. Hege carried a Heckler & Koch MP5 instead of a service revolver. The sheriff also kept the robes of eight former Ku Klux Klan members whom he claimed he had convinced to retire. Hege also claimed that Mafia hitmen had a bounty on his head, as he interrupted the flow of drugs through Davidson County. These claims could not be verified.

As Hege's national fame grew, he became the star of a Court TV program titled Inside Cell Block F. The show was filmed inside the jail, and the inmates were the studio audience. In addition, Hege appeared on Larry King Live, 20/20, and America's Most Wanted, as well as other programs. Rumors circulated that Hege intended to run for governor of North Carolina, though Hege denied these rumors.

After 9/11, a Christmas card sent out by Hege, featured him in the desert wearing a black jumpsuit, with a bloody sword and the severed head of Osama bin Laden with the title "Happy Ramadan." This sparked controversy.

Ostensibly to raise money for charity, Hege created a line of merchandise centered on his public persona. Hege merchandise items included posters, die-cast "spider cars," action figures, coffee mugs and barbecue sauce. All revenue from this merchandise and his TV appearances was donated to charity.

== Charges ==
As years passed, charges of nepotism, financial irregularities, and mismanagement began to surface. On September 15, 2003, Hege was charged with 15 felonies and suspended from office. The charges were five counts of embezzlement by a public officer, five counts of obtaining property by false pretenses, two counts of obstruction of justice, one count of endeavoring to intercept oral communication, one count of aiding and abetting to endeavor to intercept oral communication and one count of aiding and abetting to obtain property by false pretenses.

Despite Hege's "No Deals" slogan, he eventually accepted a plea agreement.

== Out of office ==
One of Hege's sons (Gerald Hege, Jr.) ran for the office of Sheriff of Davidson County, but was defeated in the May 2006 Republican primary.

Hege had three years of probation, which ended on May 17, 2007 at 12:00 am.

In September 2009, Hege again jumped into the political arena, posting signs and campaigning for the office of Sheriff of Davidson County. On February 9, 2010, he officially filed to run for his previously held job. Had Hege been elected to office, being a convicted felon, he would not have been allowed to carry a gun, although he had claimed he would work to have that privilege restored. The North Carolina Supreme Court's ruling in Britt v. State, No. 488A07 on August 28, 2009 overturned the law prohibiting convicted non-violent felons from firearm possession.

However, all of these issues became moot when Hege lost the May 2010 Republican primary to incumbent David Grice by almost 6,000 votes. Grice carried all 43 precincts in Davidson County. Hege has said that he plans to run again, although the 2010 passage of an amendment to the North Carolina state constitution barring convicted felons from serving as sheriff made another run unlikely.

== 2018 election campaign ==
On February 28, 2018, Hege filed to run for the Davidson County Sheriff office once again. According to Hege (and confirmed by Clerk of Court Brian Shipwash) his record was expunged of the felonies he pled to in 2003. A new North Carolina law passed in December 2017 reduced the wait period for application for felony expungements from 15 to 10 years.

In April 2018, the Davidson County Board of Elections denied a challenge to Hege's ability to run for Sheriff and his candidacy was approved. This made the election a four-man race including incumbent Grice, Hege, former deputy Greg Wood and former highway patrolman Richie Simmons. On May 8, the election was held and Hege came in third place behind Simmons and Grice.
