= Dunvegan (disambiguation) =

Dunvegan is a village on the Isle of Skye in Scotland.

Dunvegan may also refer to:

== Places ==
=== Canada ===
- Dunvegan, Alberta
  - Dunvegan Provincial Park, a provincial park in Dunvegan, Alberta
- Dunvegan, an unincorporated area in the Municipality of the County of Inverness, Nova Scotia
- Dunvegan, Ontario, a township, in North Glengarry
- Athlone (Edmonton), a neighbourhood in Edmonton, Alberta, also referred to as Dunvegan

=== Scotland ===
- Dunvegan Castle, a castle in Dunvegan, Scotland
- Loch Dunvegan, a lake in Scotland

=== United States ===
- Dunvegan (Holly Springs, Mississippi), a historic house in Holly Springs
- The Dunvegan, a historic apartment building in Cambridge, Massachusetts

=== South Africa ===
- Dunvegan, residential suburb of Edenvale, Gauteng

== Other ==
- Dunvegan Cup, a 15th-century artifact
- HMS Dunvegan Castle, an armed merchant cruiser of the British Royal Navy (1940–1941)
- HMS Loch Dunvegan (K425), a frigate of the British Royal Navy (1944–1960)
- RFA Fort Dunvegan (A160), a ship of the Royal Fleet Auxiliary
- Dunvegan-Central Peace, a provincial electoral district in Alberta, Canada
- Dunvegan (electoral district), a former provincial electoral district in Alberta, Canada
- Dunvegan Formation, a stratigraphic unit in the Western Canadian Sedimentary Basin
- Edmonton, Dunvegan and British Columbia Railway (ED&BC), an early pioneer railway in northwestern Alberta, Canada
