= Anne Walter Fearn =

American physician (1867–1939)

Anne Walter Fearn (May 21, 1867 – April 28, 1939) was an American physician who went to Shanghai, China, on a temporary posting in 1893, and remained there for 40 years.

== Family ==
She grew up in Holly Springs, Mississippi, just after the American Civil War. Her father was lawyer, Harvey Washington Walter, who served in the Confederate Army as Judge Advocate under General Bragg; her mother, Martha Fredonia Brown, was descended from pioneers who had travelled west in 1788.

When Anne Walter was thirteen, yellow fever hit the town of Holly Springs and her father sent his wife and youngest children away. He and three of his eldest sons remained behind and turned their mansion into a hospital to help look after the sick. In doing so they all contracted the fever and died within a week of each other.

The death of Anne's father, and subsequent crop failures on their land, resulted in the Walter family facing serious financial difficulties despite the efforts of her surviving brother Harvey. Fortunately two of Anne's sisters married influential and wealthy men: Minnie married Henry Clay Myers, who was the Mississippi Secretary of State from 1879 to 1885, and Irene married Oscar Johnson of the International Shoe Company, who purchased Walter Place in 1889.

== Medical school ==
At the age of twelve Anne was sent to Charlotte Female Institute, North Carolina, for three years. By the time she was sixteen she described herself as "only being qualified to be a social butterfly", but she was inspired to become a doctor of medicine. On hearing this her mother threatened to disown her but eventually relented and Anne entered the Cooper Medical College in San Francisco.

She was then awarded a scholarship to the Woman's Medical College of Pennsylvania, from where she graduated in 1893. One of her colleagues at medical school, Dr. Margaret Polk, had been appointed to a missionary hospital in China, but due to family commitments could not go immediately, so Anne offered to take her place. At this time women who qualified as doctors were not always given the opportunity to practise, so this chance to work in China was welcomed by Anne.

== Soochow hospital ==
Although she did not belong to a church, Anne became an employee of the Women's Board of Foreign Missions of the Methodist Episcopal Church South. She was based at Soochow (Suzhou) women's hospital, about 60 miles to the west of Shanghai. When Anne arrived in China, the journey between the two places took three days via the Suzhou Creek; later a rail link was constructed, reducing the journey time to a matter of hours. The women's hospital (also known as the Mary Black Hospital) had been opened in 1884 by Dr. Mildred Philips. She left in about 1892 and the hospital was temporarily closed until the arrival of Anne Walter. She soon became known for her energetic approach and during her fourteen years at the hospital she performed operations, delivered babies, opened additional wards, and started a medical school for Chinese students.

== Marriage ==
In 1896, she married a missionary physician, Dr. John Burrus Fearn, a native of Yazoo City, Mississippi. They had different views on religion, there was professional rivalry between them, and Anne said that her husband was "dominant and born to give orders, just as definitely as I was born not to take them". Needless to say their marriage was described as "sometimes stormy". They had one child, a daughter Elizabeth, born in 1897, but who died of amoebic dysentery in 1902.

In 1900 the couple took a furlough and returned to the U.S. The journey was delayed due to enforced periods of quarantine after the death of a passenger from yellow fever. Their absence from China coincided with the Boxer Rebellion and when they returned to Suzhou they found conditions had changed. There had been many executions, soldiers were billeted in the hospital chapel, and it was months before normality returned.

In 1905 anti-American sentiments in China resulted in further civil unrest, and for a period the Fearn family moved to Shanghai. Once the situation calmed down, they returned to Suzhou, where they made plans for a world tour followed by a permanent move back to America.

== 1907 to 1914 ==
In 1907, Dr. John Fearn resigned his position and the couple moved to the United States. They returned the following year to Shanghai, where he became a business manager for the Associated Protestant Missions. Inactivity did not suit Anne so she helped out in various missions and clinics; these included Miss Cornelia Bonnel's shelter for girls who had been forced into slavery or prostitution, and the Margaret Williamson Hospital for Chinese women and children.

In February 1909, Francis Augustus Carl of the Chinese Maritime Customs invited her to attend the International Opium Conference in Shanghai. She hosted a reception for the delegates, and this became the first of many such social events that she organised during her time in China. She was invited to join the American Women's Club in Shanghai, being elected as the corresponding secretary.

Still frustrated at the lack of a purpose in her life she became involved with community work; this included opening facilities for visiting US sailors and efforts to improve the conditions for Chinese workers. She applied to work in Manchuria during a plague epidemic, but another doctor who had the necessary inoculations was selected to go instead. In 1910 she travelled to Japan and for a period worked as an obstetrician.

Upon her return to Shanghai she became a physician in the Foreign Women's Rescue Home and continued to work at the Margaret Williamson Hospital. During the revolutionary period of 1913, the Fearns worked with refugees in the city whilst stray bullets and shells landed around them from the fighting at the Kiangnan Arsenal.

== Sanatorium ==
In 1914, the Fearns started another trip, this time across China to Russia, arriving in Moscow just as the First World War began. They travelled to London and offered their medical services for the war effort, but were told they should go to the USA and register there. When they tried this they were informed that only male surgeons were required.

They both returned to Shanghai, where Anne started a private medical practise in partnership with Dr Polk. Her husband left for France, where he became a temporary honorary Captain in the Royal Army Medical Corps, working with the Chinese Labour Corps.

She rented a large house in the Shanghai French Concession and turned it into a private hospital called the Fearn Sanitorium. She managed to buy the property with funding from a wealthy Chinese man and the Hongkong and Shanghai Banking Corporation.

She ran the hospital for ten years until the death of her husband on June 7, 1926. He had, following his return from the war, been the medical superintendent and director of the Shanghai General Hospital and later administered the new Country Hospital.

== Eugen Steinach ==
After the sale of the sanatorium Anne left Shanghai and travelled to the USA; she followed the route of an earlier trip she had taken with her husband. By the time she reached Vienna she was exhausted; an acquaintance informed her of the work of Eugen Steinach and his claims of being able to restore vitality and energy. Anne contacted Steinach, who was based in Vienna, and arranged to take the 30-day course of treatment. This started with tests followed by electrical treatment to improve circulation, injections of glandular extracts and occasional x-rays. On the eighth day she had become so weak she could hardly dress herself, but remarkably after this she began to feel invigorated. The effects lasted for two years and she then booked herself in for another treatment.

== Indefatigable social worker ==
Anne could not settle in America and yet again returned to Shanghai, where she was involved with charitable fundraising activities, hosting gatherings with financiers, politicians, and artists. She travelled abroad, giving talks and meeting influential figures to gain support for organisations such as the National Child Welfare Association of China and the Shanghai American School.

She was in Manila in 1932 when a military conflict took place in Shanghai between Japanese and Chinese forces (referred to as the Shanghai Incident or January 28 Incident ). This placed greater pressure on the voluntary services that Anne worked for, supporting refugees, the homeless and orphans.

== Her memoirs and death ==
Anne returned home in 1938, where she completed her memoirs My Days of Strength just before her death in Berkeley, California on April 28, 1939, aged 71. She dedicated the book to Irene, "my sister and friend".
