= Strawberry Plains Audubon Center =

Nature center in Mississippi

Strawberry Plains Audubon Center is a nature center on the grounds of the historic Davis House four miles north of Holly Springs, Mississippi. The house dates to before the American Civil War. University of Georgia emeritus Literature professor Hubert McAlexander wrote a book about the site. The property incorporates 3,000 acres of hardwood forests, hiking trails, native plant garden, ponds, and wildflowers with educational and conservation programs. Every year, the center hosts a hummingbird festival during a mass migration of Ruby-throated Hummingbirds.

== History ==
Ruth Finley and Margaret Finley Shackelford, sisters, bequeathed 2,500 acres and two antebellum houses in Marshall County, Mississippi to the National Audubon Society in 1982. Margaret Shackelford invited the society to open its state headquarters at her family home outside Holly Springs in 1982.

The property is named for wild strawberries that grow in the area. The Davis House, built in 1851 by Eben Nelms Davis, was burned by the Union Army during the American Civil War.
