= Spires Boling =

American architect

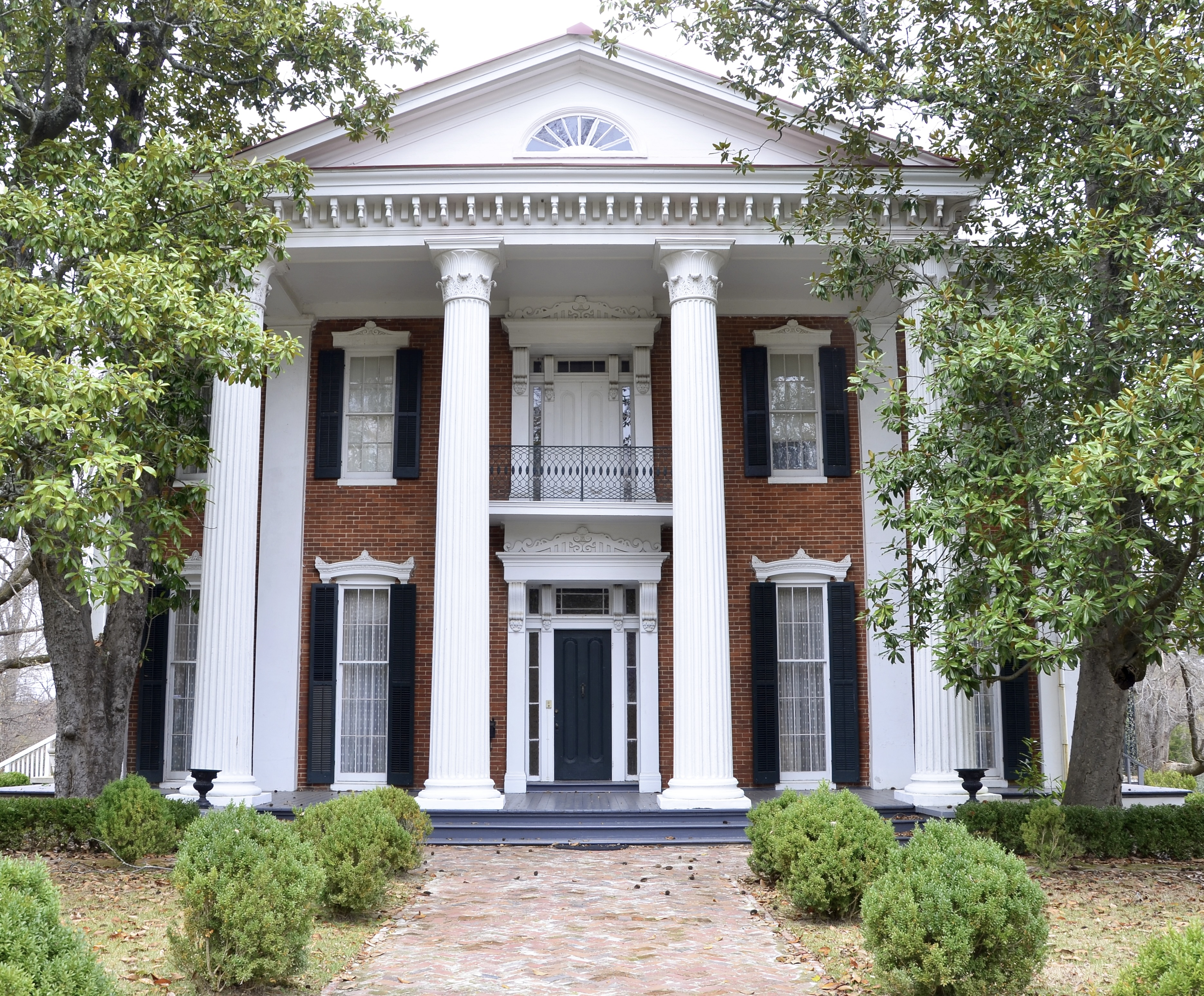
Oakleigh / Athenia

Spires Boling (1812–1880), whose name is often misspelled as Spires Bolling, was a slaveowner, master builder, architect, and distillery founder in Holly Springs, Mississippi. He is known for holding the journalist Ida B. Wells and her family in bondage. There is now a museum dedicated to her in his former home the Boling–Gatewood House. He is also remembered for his grand, columned, neoclassical residential buildings and his design for the Marshall County, Mississippi Courthouse in Holly Springs. His courthouse design was also used by the firm of Willis, Sloan, and Trigg for two other courthouses and featured in the work of William Faulkner. The Walter Place mansion he designed was home to Ulysses S. Grant and his wife for a period during the American Civil War.

Originally from North Carolina, Boling lived in Ohio for a while before he moved to Holly Springs in 1845. He married a woman named Nancy who was originally from Virginia.

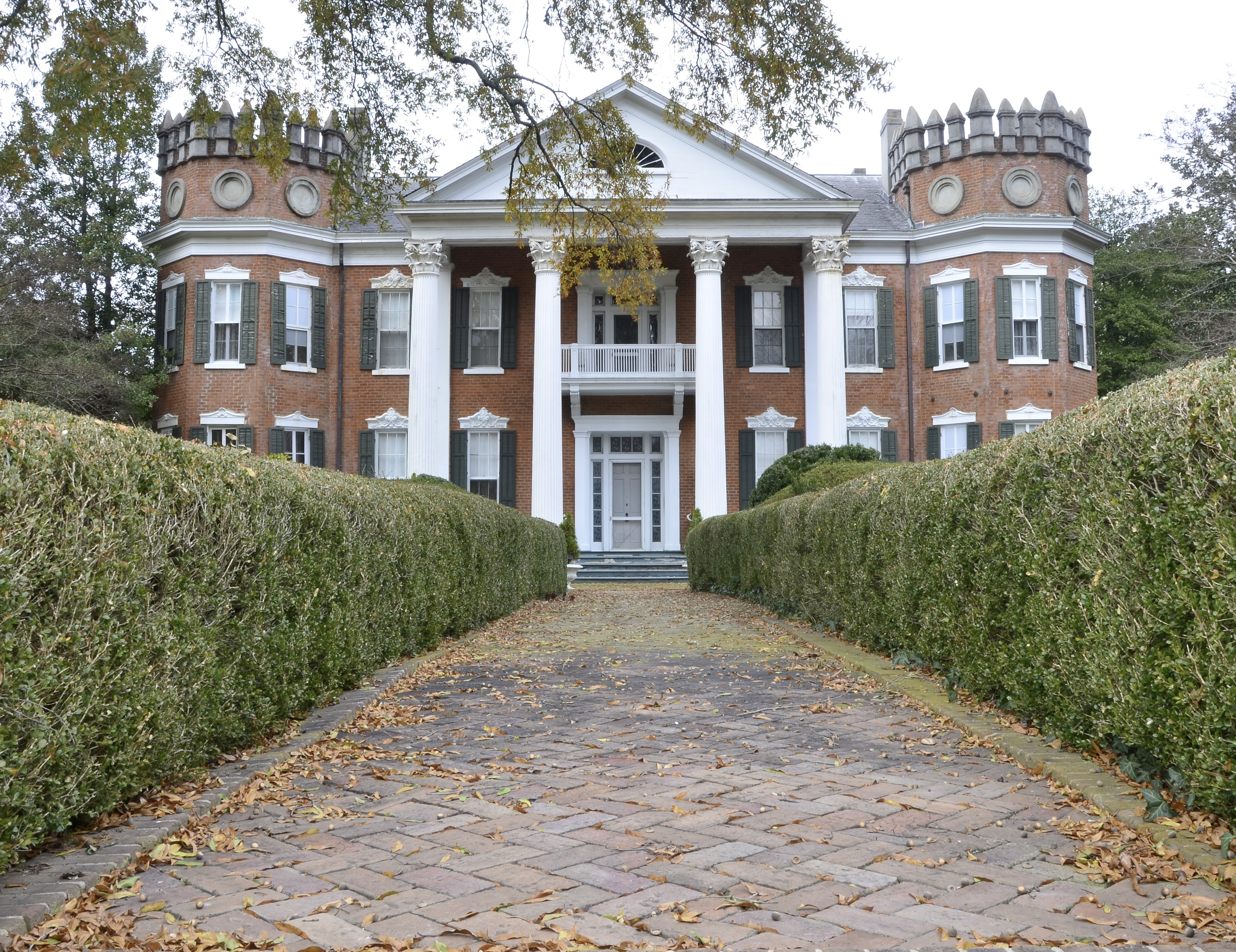
Walter Place

In 1858–1860, Harvey Washington Walter commissioned Boling for Walter Place, a mansion in Holly Springs, Mississippi.

After the Civil War, one of his former slaves, Jim Wells (who was still living on the Boling property with his family), moved his carpentry business across the street after Boling urged him to vote for Democrats. Boling built and operated the Johnson's Mill distillery at Randolph's Springs behind his house where Spring Hollow Park is now located.

Willis, Sloan, and Trigg was a short-lived partnership that contracted the courthouse as well as others.

According to local preservationist Phillip Knecht, he also designed Montrose (Holly Springs, Mississippi) (1858) Athenia (1858), Wakefield (1858), and Pointer House (c. 1858 and eventually demolished).

Before it was converted into an armory for the production and repair of guns, the Jones, McElwain and Company Iron Foundry in Holly Springs produced wrought iron adornments including gates and fittings that were used in some of the area's grand homes such as Boling's.

In 2018 a monument was added to his gravesite at Hillcrest Cemetery by Hubert McAlexander, a historian, author, and emeritus professor of literature at the University of Georgia.

== Works ==
- Bolling-Gatewood House (1858)
- White Pillars
- Buildings on the Holly Springs Courthouse Square (which show Boling's typical cast-iron window lintels)
- Finley Place
- Montrose (Holly Springs, Mississippi) (1858)
- Oakleigh / Athenia (1858)
- Wakefield (1858), part of East Holly Springs Historic District. The home is two-stories
- Pointer House (c. 1858 and eventually demolished)
- Walter Place (1859)
- Masonic Hall (burned 1952)
- Marshall County Courthouse in Holly Springs, the building's design was also used for:

Lafayette County Courthouse in Oxford, Mississippi
Old Hardeman County Courthouse Bolivar, Tennessee. It features in the work of William Faulkner.

== Gallery ==
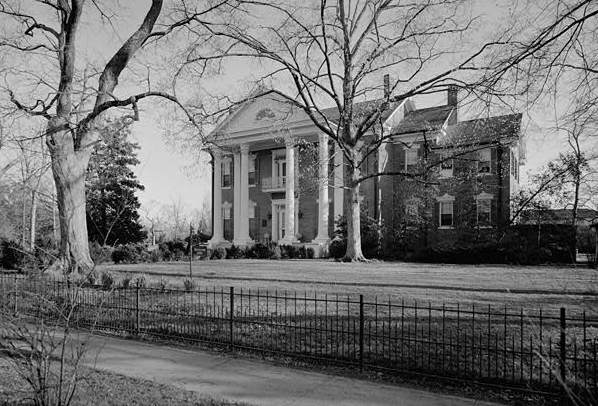
Montrose

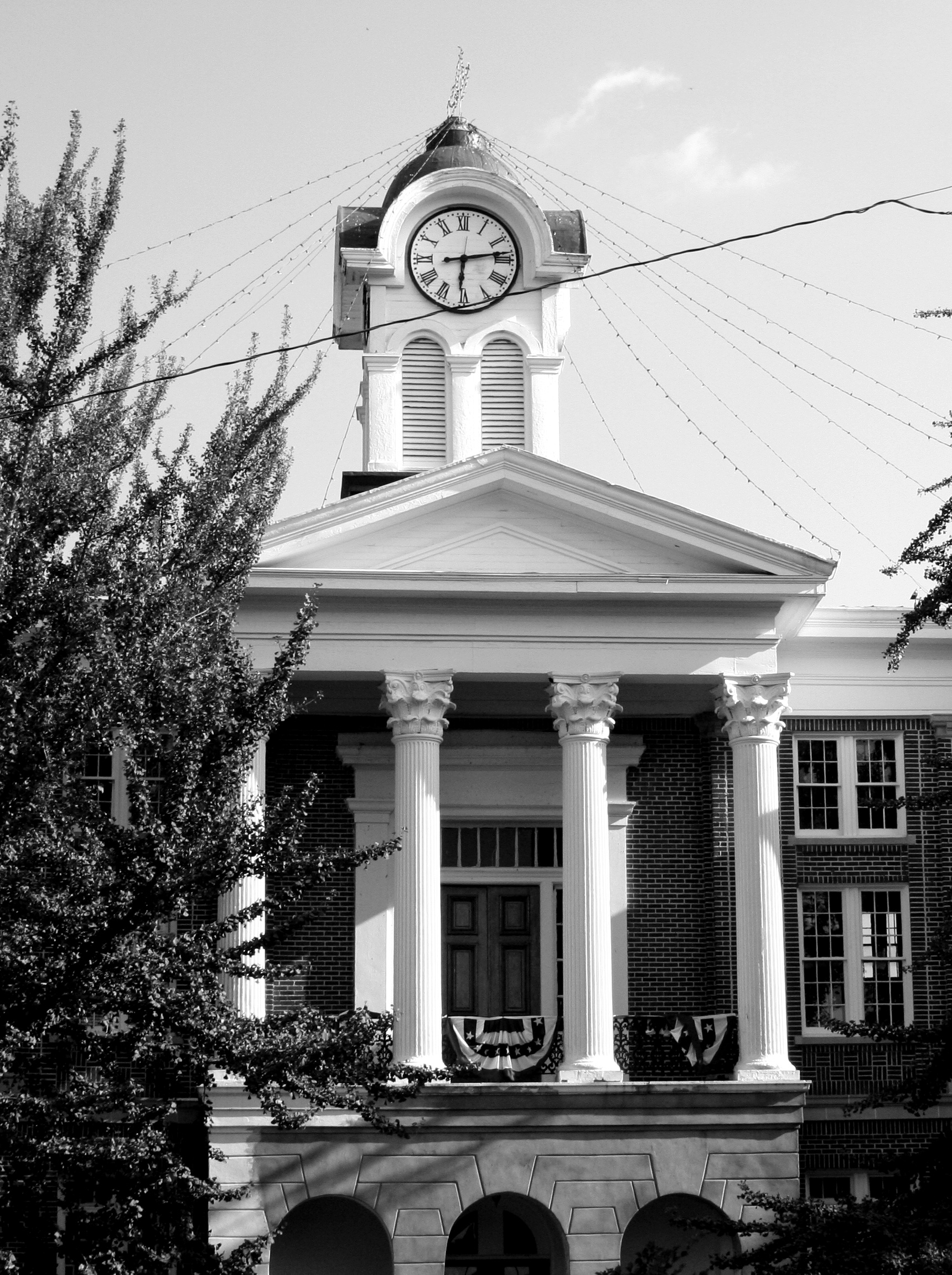
Marshall County Courthouse

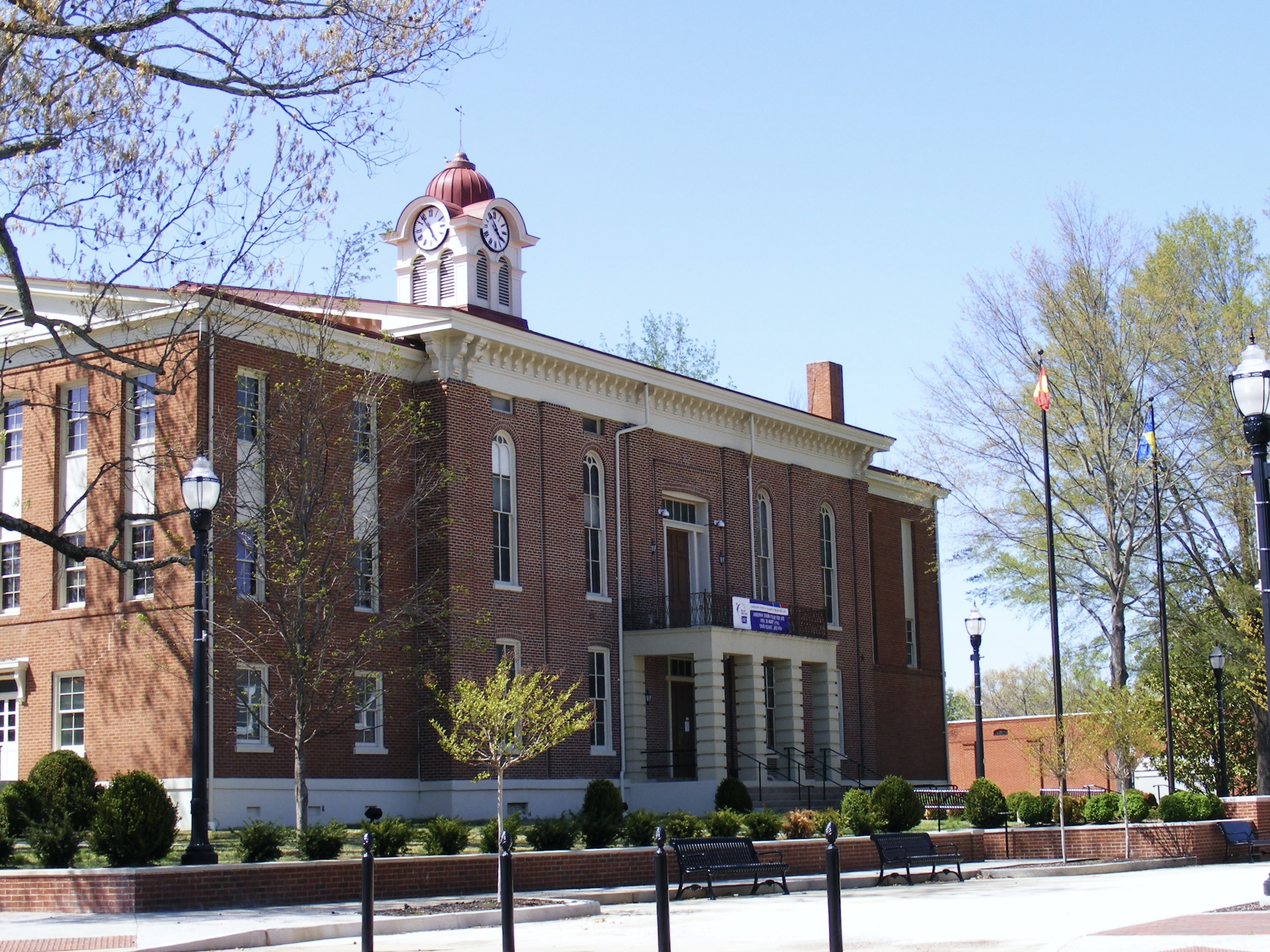
Handeman County Courthouse

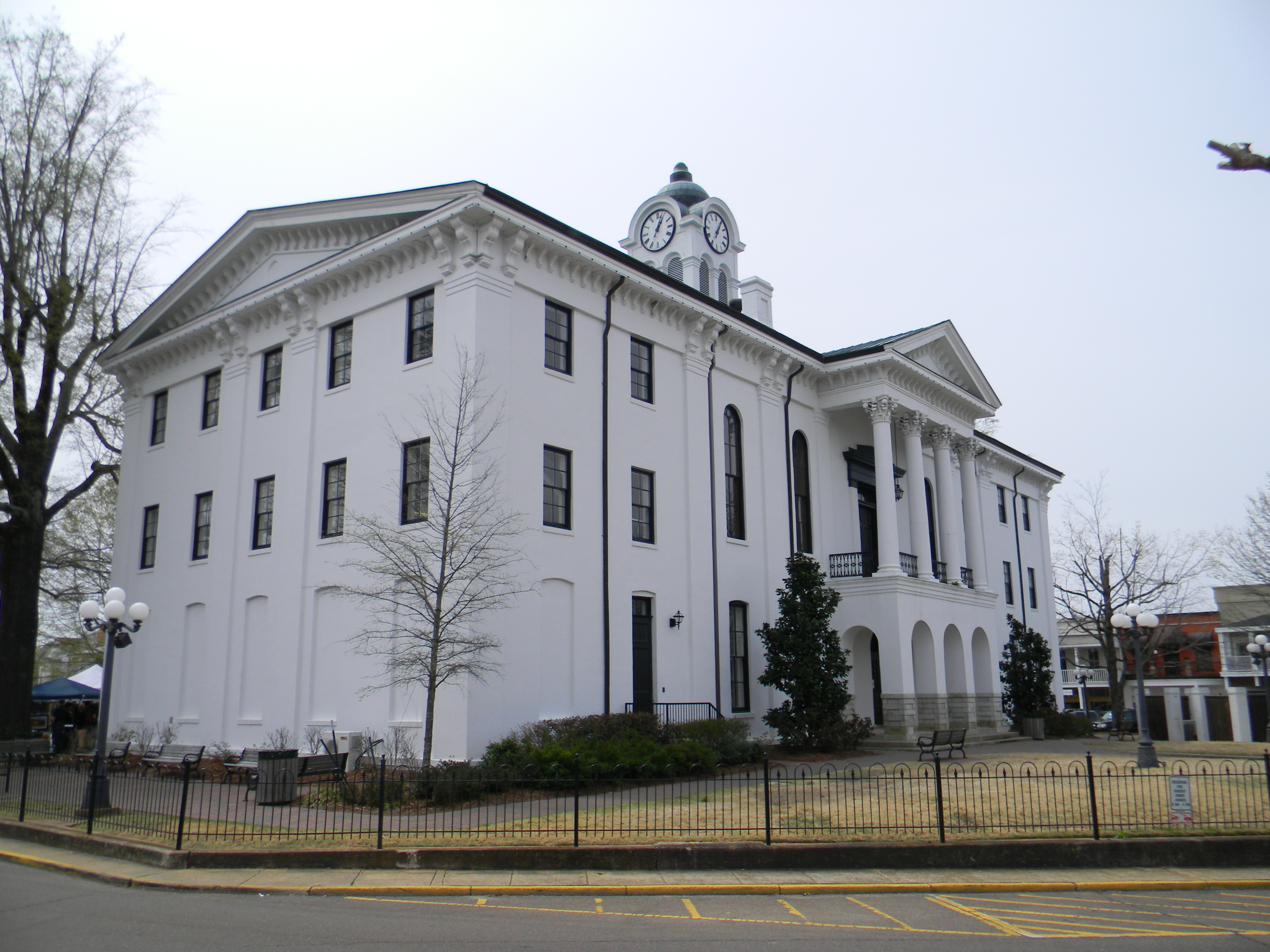
Lafayette County Courthouse
