= Walter Place =

Walter Place may refer to:

== People ==
- Walter Place (footballer, born 1869), English association footballer for Burnley, Colne and Bacup
- Walter Place (footballer, born 1872), English association footballer for Burnley and Woolwich Arsenal

== Location ==
- Walter Place (Holly Springs, Mississippi), a historic mansion in Holly Springs, Mississippi, USA
