= Southwest Holly Springs Historic District =

Historic district in Mississippi, United States

- U.S. National Register of Historic Places
- U.S. Historic district
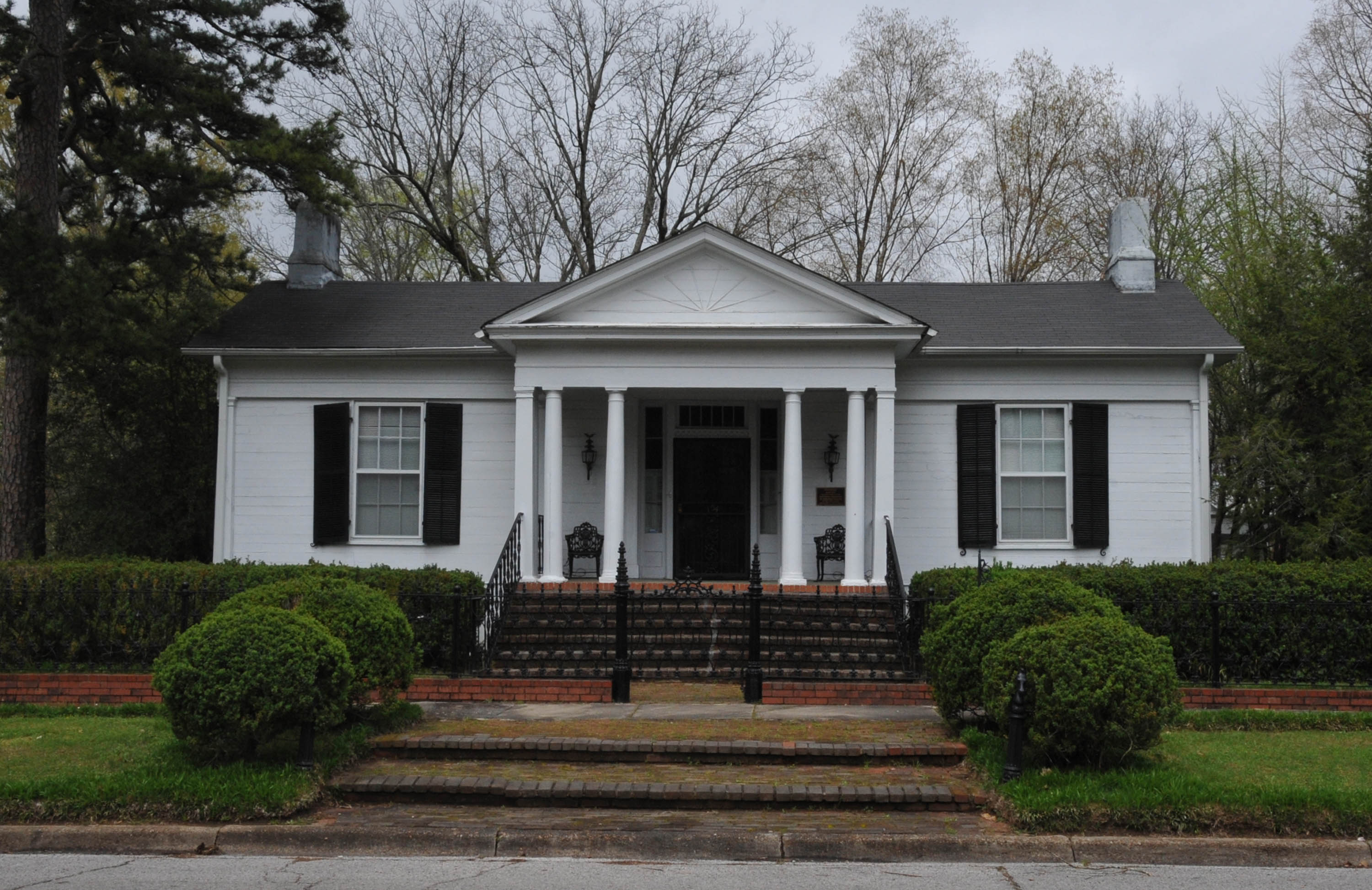
- Dunvegan, on West Gholson Avenue

- Location within Mississippi Location within the United States
- Location: Bounded by S. Center, S. Memphis, and Craft Sts., Marbury Ct., Chulahoma, Gholson, Elder and Mason Aves., Holly Springs, Mississippi
- Coordinates: 34°45′51″N 89°27′4″W
- Area: 50 acres (20 ha)
- Architectural style: Mixed (more Than 2 Styles From Different Periods)
- MPS: Holly Springs MRA
- NRHP reference No.: 83000963
- Added to NRHP: April 20, 1983

The Southwest Holly Springs Historic District in Holly Springs, Mississippi is a 50-acre (20 ha) historic district that was listed on the National Register of Historic Places in 1983. Of the 80 buildings in the district, 53 are considered as adding to its architectural or historical significance.

All of the properties in the district are residences. Construction dates range from the mid 1800s to the mid 1900s. Many of the homes are on tree lined streets with large yards.

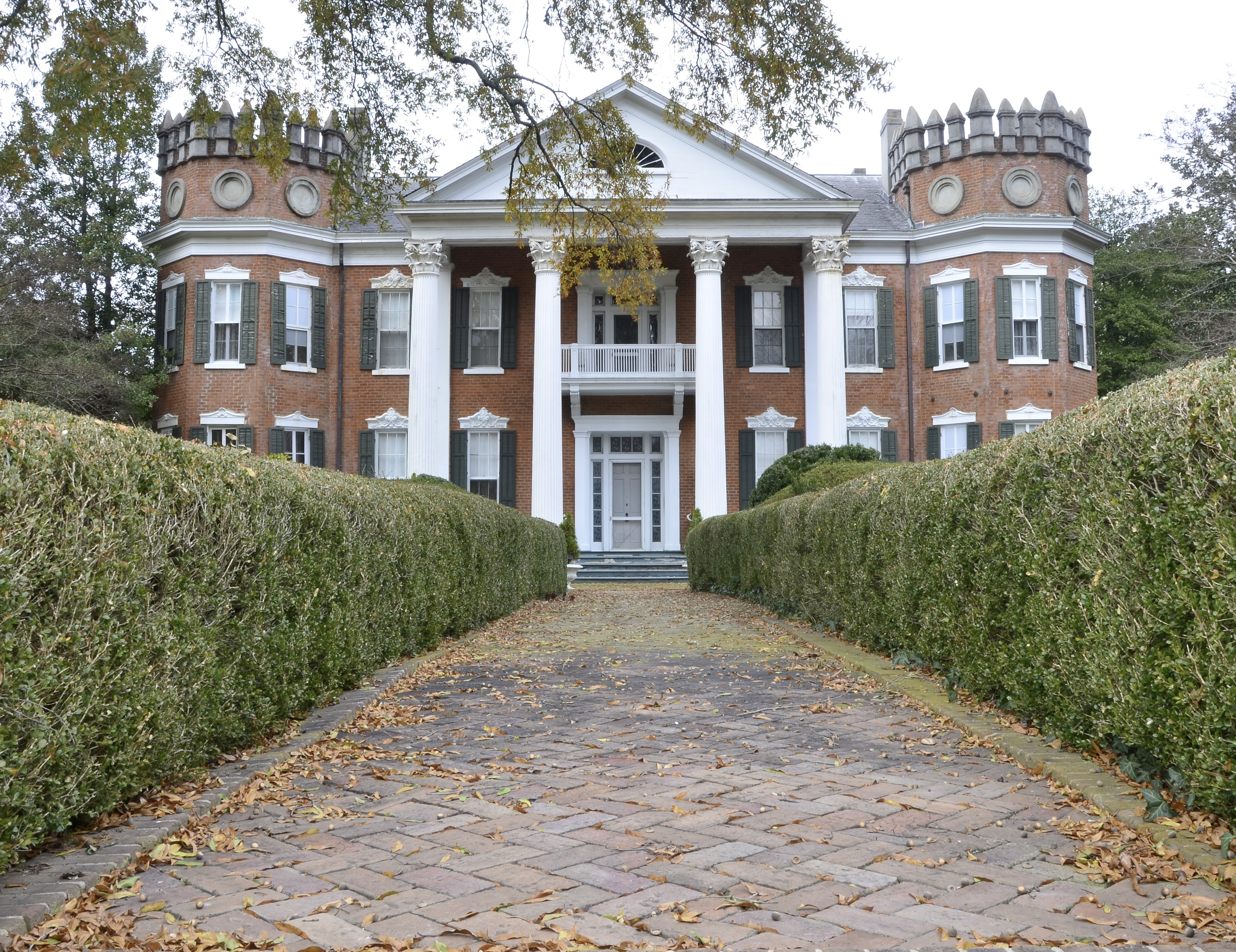
Walter Place was designed by prominent Holly Springs resident and architect Spires Boling and was used by Ulysses S. Grant during the American Civil War

Walter Place, Fort Daniel Place, Fleur-de-Lis, and Mimosas are among the prominent residences.
