= Lafayette County Courthouse (Mississippi) =

- U.S. National Register of Historic Places
- U.S. Historic district – Contributing property
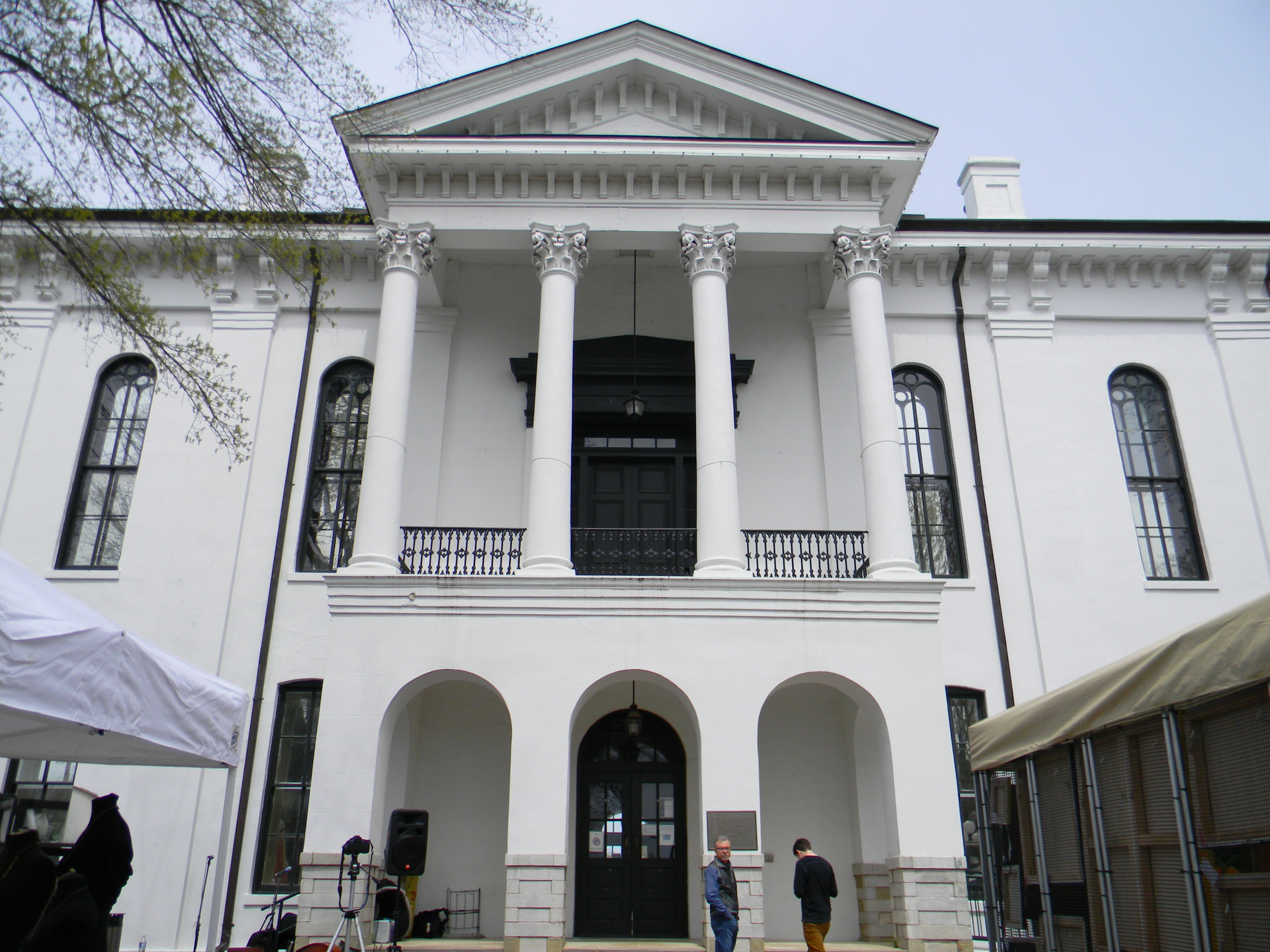
- Lafayette County Mississippi Courthouse South Facing

- Location within Mississippi Location within the United States
- Interactive map showing the location of Lafayette County Courthouse
- Location: Courthouse Sq., Oxford, Mississippi
- Coordinates: 34°22′0″N 89°31′6″W
- Area: less than one acre
- Built: 1871
- Architect: S. Boling
- Architectural style: Greek Revival, Italianate
- NRHP reference No.: 77000791
- Added to NRHP: September 23, 1977

The Lafayette County Courthouse is located in Oxford, Mississippi and listed on the National Register of Historic Places.

The current structure was constructed in 1872 to replace an earlier building burned during the Civil War by Union troops directed by General Andrew Jackson Smith. Spires Boling of the firm Willis, Sloan and Trigg was the courthouse's architect. Two subsequent expansions of the building were performed. In 1952 and 1953, the west and east bays were added. The structure was renovated in 1981.

The Courthouse currently houses several judicial courtrooms and related offices, including the Third Circuit Judicial District Court, and the Third Circuit District Drug Court, which both serve Benton, Calhoun, Chickasaw, Lafayette, Marshall, Tippah, and Union counties. The Courthouse also contains the office of the Circuit Court Clerk.

According to the court's website, "Mississippi's Circuit Courts hear felony criminal prosecutions and civil lawsuits. Circuit Courts hear appeals from County, Justice and Municipal courts and from administrative boards and commissions such as the Workers' Compensation Commission and the Mississippi Department of Employment Security."

As the structural centerpiece to the home of William Faulkner, the Courthouse also plays a significant role in Faulkner's fictional Jefferson County. The Courthouse appears in multiple works. These include stories featuring the lawyer Gavin Stevens (including Knight's Gambit), the dramatic ending to The Sound and the Fury, and elements of Go Down, Moses.

== Gallery ==
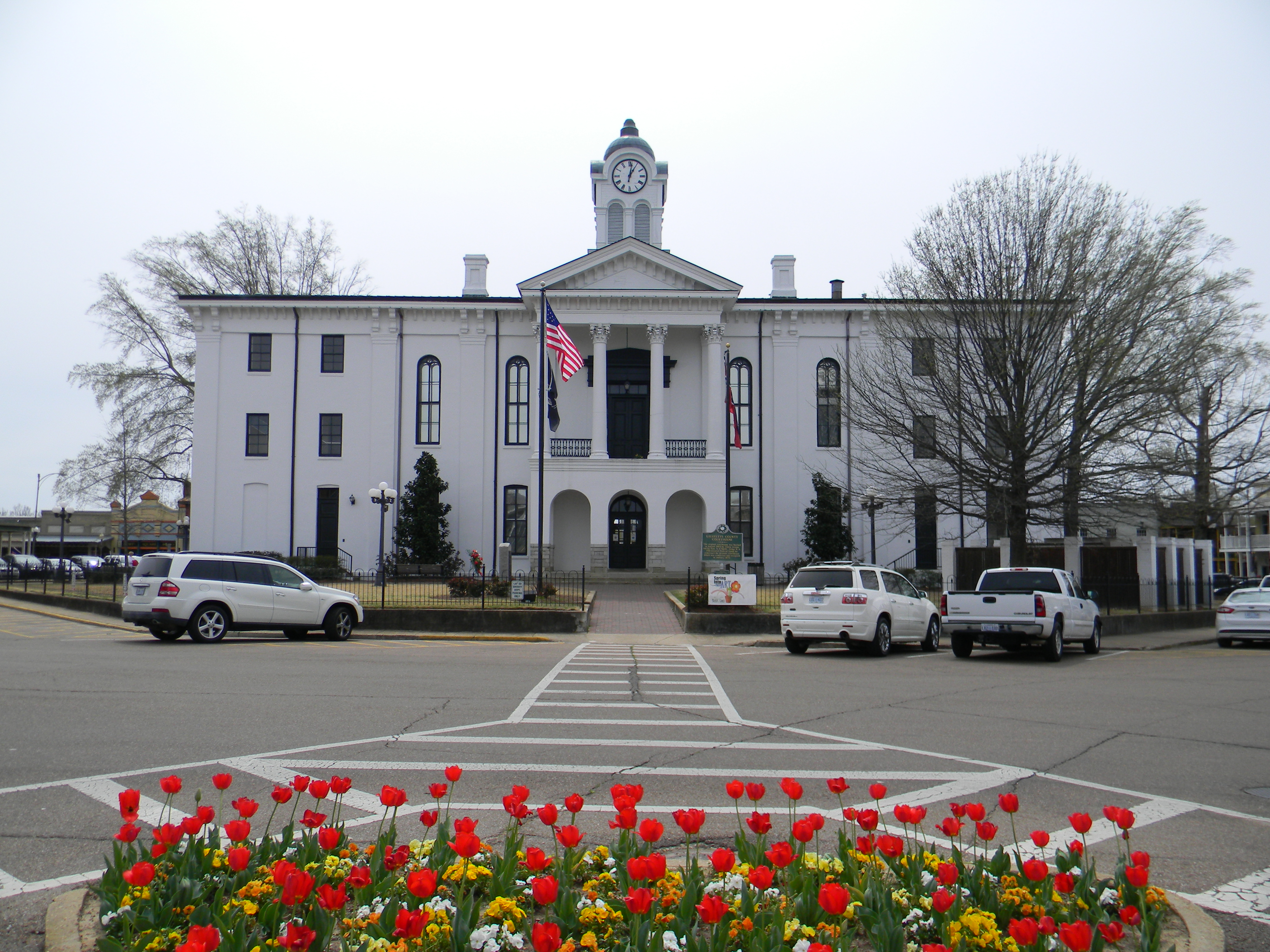
Lafayette County Mississippi Courthouse North Facing

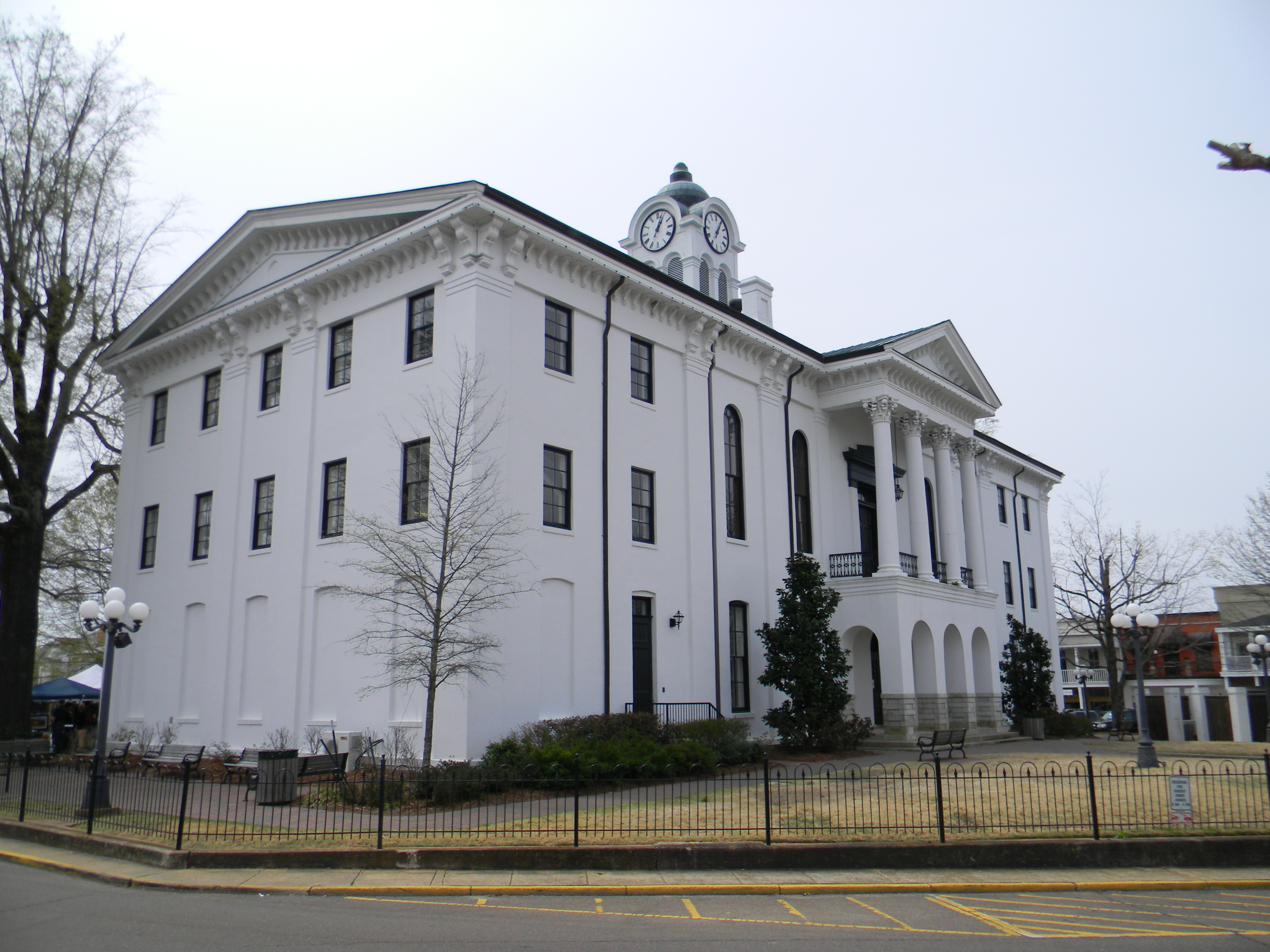
Lafayette County Mississippi Courthouse NE Facing

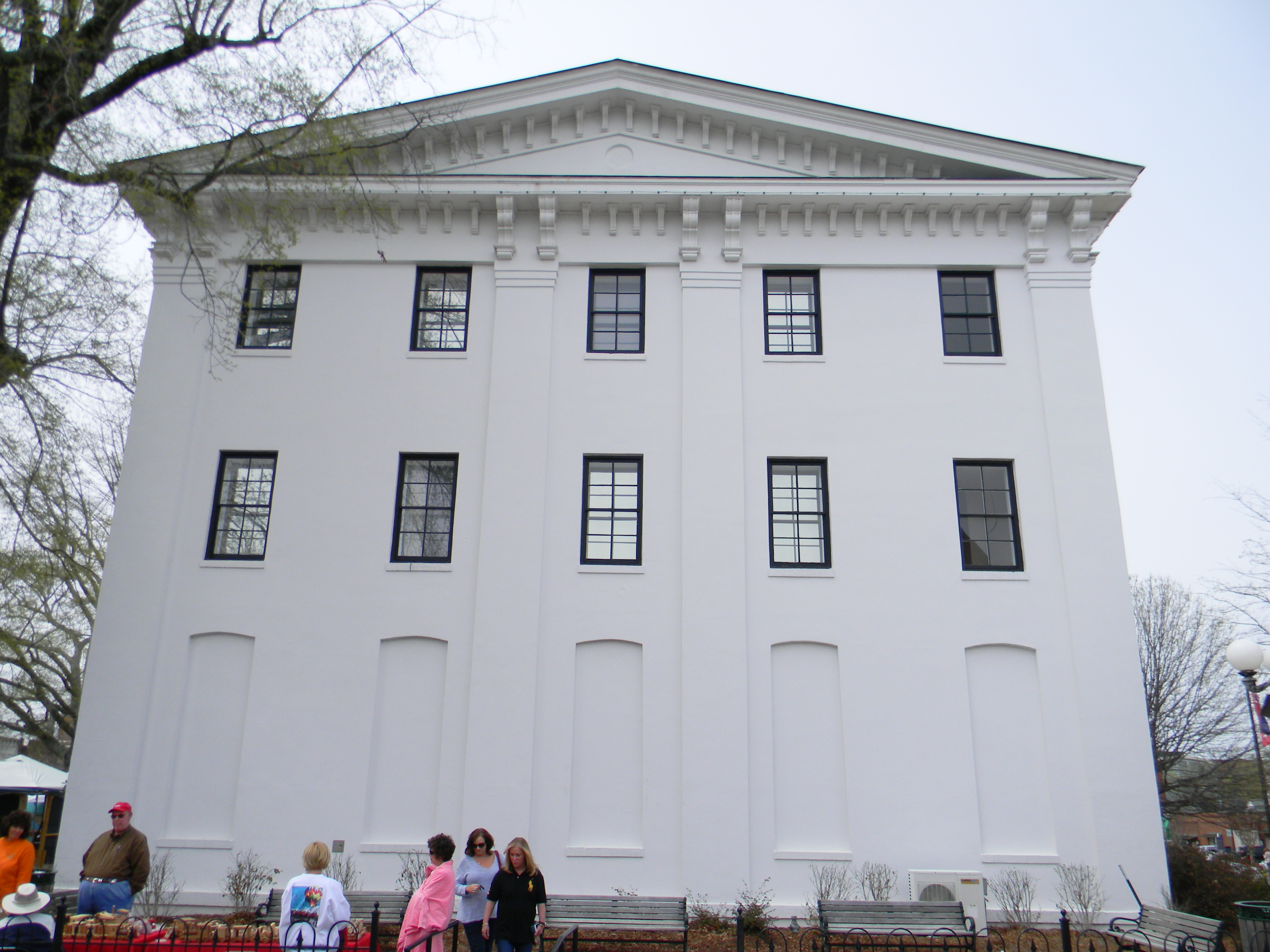
Lafayette County Mississippi Courthouse East Facing

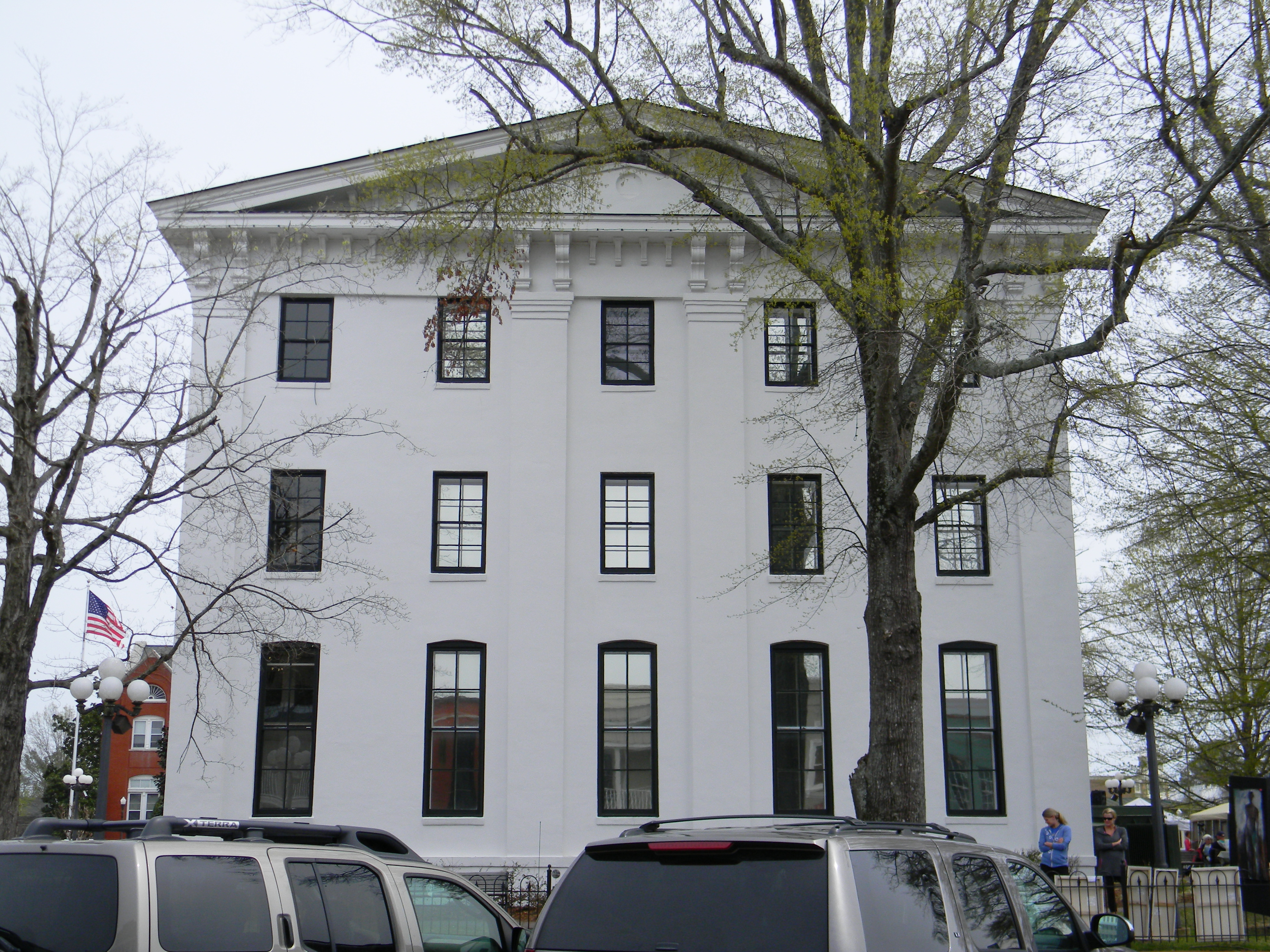
Lafayette County Courthouse Mississippi West Facing
