= Dunvegan (Holly Springs, Mississippi) =

Historic house in Mississippi, United States

- U.S. Historic district – Contributing property
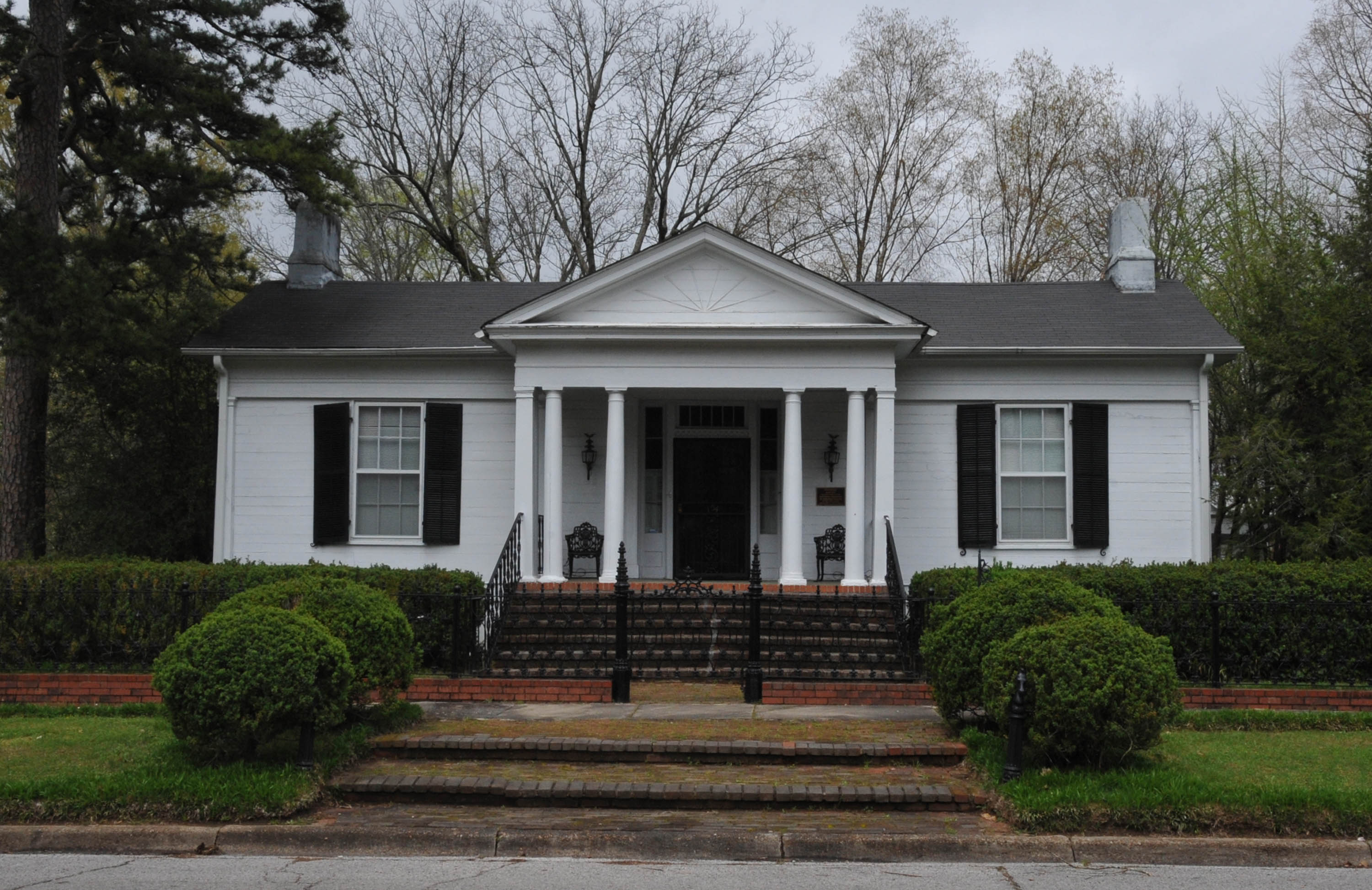
- Dunvegan in 2008.

- Location within Mississippi Location within the United States
- Location: 159 Gholson Avenue West, Holly Springs, Mississippi, U.S.
- Coordinates: 34°46′00.2″N 89°27′02.3″W
- Built: 1845
- Architectural style: Greek Revival
- Part of: Southwest Holly Springs Historic District (ID83000963)
- Added to NRHP: April 20, 1983

Dunvegan, a.k.a. Norfleet-Cochran House is a historic "English Basement" cottage in Holly Springs, Mississippi, USA. It was built in 1845 for Jesse P. Norfleet, a cabinetmaker from Virginia who married the daughter of a prosperous Mississippi planter. Norfleet eventually became a planter and local business owner. In the 1970s the home was renamed Dunvegan for the town of Dunvegan on the Scottish island of Skye.

== Location ==
Dunvegan is located at 154 West Gholson Avenue in Holly Springs, Mississippi.

== History ==
The land was acquired by Jesse P. Norfleet on January 3, 1845. The cottage, designed in the Greek Revival architectural style, was built later that year. The rafters were made of pine tree wood while the bricks were handcrafted. Like a traditional English cottage, the bedrooms and the living-rooms are upstairs, while the kitchen and dining-room are in the basement.

Norfleet was a cabinetmaker from Suffolk, Virginia who married Jane H. Carlock, the daughter of Moses Carlock, a Southern planter. His daughter Ada married Henry Oscar Rand; Norfleet's grandson, Frank C. Rand, was the Chairman of the International Shoe Company. Norfleet traded houses with James Jarrell House on September 28, 1861.

T. F. Sigman bought the house in 1886 and owned the house for over 30 years, until he and his wife divorced, probably in 1917. At that time the ownership of the house transferred to his former wife Cornelia Olivia Sigman.

In 1920, the house was sold to Samuel Vadah Cochran Sr. (1887–1971) and his wife Rita Binion Cochran (1896–1960). The essay "English Basement Houses" by Hubert H. McAlexander, noted historian of the area, states that Rita Binion Cochran eventually had the portico rebuilt to resemble that of the nearby Featherstone Place, recently renovated by the architect Theodore Link. It remains the house's portico to this day. After Cochran Sr.'s death in 1971, the house was inherited by his son, Samuel Vadah Cochran Jr. (1918–1995).

S. Vadah Cochran, Jr. was a professor of English at Memphis State University in Tennessee for twenty-six years as well as a noted painter whose work was exhibited at the Municipal Art Gallery in Jackson, Mississippi. He painted murals inside the house and designed the gardens. Vadah and his wife Doris Sigman Cochran renamed the cottage Dunvegan after the town on the Scottish island of Skye, where his McLeod ancestors originated. They opened it to the public for a tour once a year.

The house is now owned by John O. Carruth and Leslie Cochran Carruth, both architects. Leslie visited the home and her extended family many times over the years and grew to love both the home and the town.

== Architectural significance ==
As a contributing property to the Southwest Holly Springs Historic District, it has been listed on the National Register of Historic Places since April 20, 1983.
