= William Baskerville Hamilton =

American historian (1908–1972)

William Baskerville Hamilton (March 7, 1908 – July 17, 1972) was a historian at Duke University who focused on the history of the American South and of Great Britain. He was assistant managing editor of little magazine South Atlantic Quarterly from 1956, and managing editor from 1958 until just before his death in 1972.

== Biography ==
=== Youth and education ===
William Baskerville Hamilton was born on March 7, 1908 in Jackson, Mississippi, where he attended public school. He went to the University of Mississippi, where he received his degrees in history, an AB (1928) and an MA (1931). He taught in the public schools in Jackson and in Holly Springs between 1928 and 1934, and then moved to North Carolina to attend Duke University.

=== Academic career ===
He received his Ph.D. from the university in 1938, with a dissertation on Mississippi history. He began teaching at Duke in 1936 and stayed there until his death. His dissertation, supervised by William K. Boyd, was much used by later scholars. He was taught British history by William T. Laprade. He taught and published on the contemporary history of the Commonwealth of Nations, and helped establish the Center for Commonwealth Studies at Duke. His scholarly work led him to many international trips to England and its colonies and dependencies (Canada, New Zealand, Australia, Ghana, and Nigeria).

In 1952, Hamilton edited, and wrote the introduction for, a volume on the history of the little magazine South Atlantic Quarterly; in 1956 he became managing editor for that journal. He published a monograph on Thomas Rodney's work as a judge in the Mississippi Territory. While Hamilton claimed not to be a legal scholar, a contemporary reviewer praised his work and his legal cogency. The book contains transcriptions of Rodney's notebooks from 1804 to 1809, which took Hamilton a decade to produce, based on documents held by the Library of Congress and other collections. According to the reviewer these notes ("a precious rarity") "will be highly useful in studies of the antebellum colonial policy of the United States". He also edited a volume on the Commonwealth of Nations, and published more than two dozen book chapters and journal articles.

His long standing interest in constitutional and legal history led him to work on the American Historical Association's Littleton-Griswold fund. A longtime member, he enjoyed attending the meetings of the Southern Historical Association, and was on the board of editors of the Journal of Southern History. He was also fellow of the English Royal Historical Society, and a member of Phi Beta Kappa and Omicron Delta Kappa.

=== Service to the university ===
Hamilton helped expand the collection of manuscripts at the university's library, in particular British ones, building the British Historical Manuscripts Collection at Duke's Perkins Library. He was on the library council for many years, and was its chairman for one year. His will established the William B. Hamilton Fund for obtaining British materials, saying of the library that he loved it "as well as I do compound interest".

From 1949 to 1950, he was the president of Duke's chapter of the American Association of University Professors, and led the push toward the establishment of a Faculty Senate at Duke. In 1951 he was elected to a reorganization committee which rewrote the bylaws of the university and set up a University Council, for which he was a member for a number years, and its vice-chairman in 1960–1961. Its successor, the Academic Council, started in 1962 with Hamilton as its first chairman until 1964.

=== Personal life ===
Hamilton married Mary Elizabeth Boyd on May 27, 1938; they had one child, Elizabeth Cavett, born in 1940. Hamilton's wife died on March 5, 1954; he died on July 17, 1972.

== Select bibliography ==
- Fifty Years of the South Atlantic Quarterly (Durham: Duke UP, 1952)
- Anglo-American Law on the Frontier: Thomas Rodney and His Territorial Cases (Durham: Duke UP, 1953)
- The Transfer of Institutions (Durham: Duke UP, 1964)
