= The Montrose =

- U.S. National Register of Historic Places
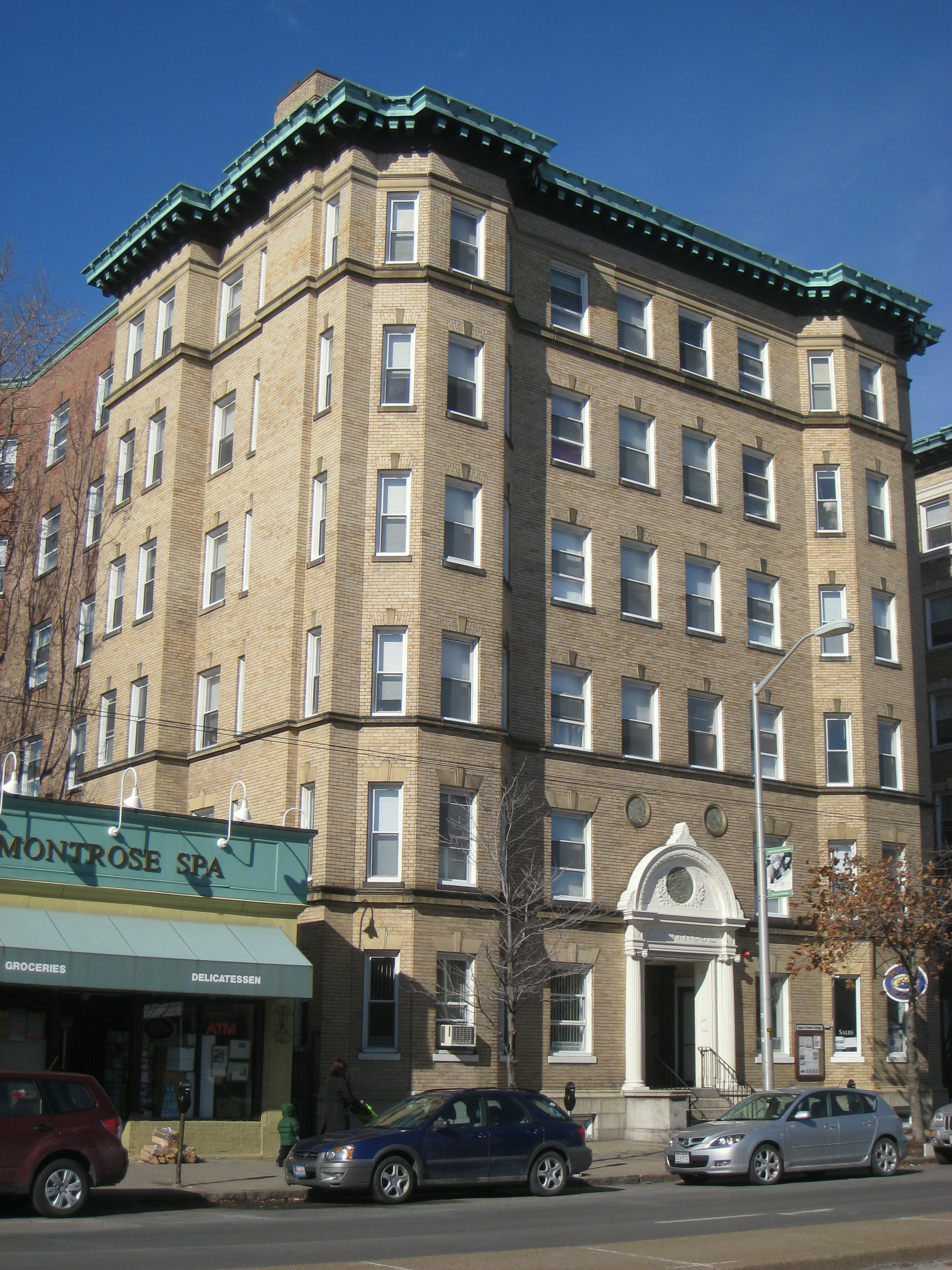

- Location within Massachusetts Location within the United States
- Location: 1648 Massachusetts Avenue, Cambridge, Massachusetts
- Coordinates: 42°22′52.9″N 71°7′12.3″W
- Built: 1898
- Architect: J.S. Harold
- Architectural style: Renaissance
- MPS: Cambridge MRA
- NRHP reference No.: 86001311
- Added to NRHP: May 19, 1986

The Montrose is a historic multiunit residential building in Cambridge, Massachusetts. It is a six-story yellow brick building, whose Italian Renaissance details include a copper cornice with modillions, varied window treatments on each floor, belt courses of brickwork between some of the floors, and a front entry surround with fluted Doric columns. Built in 1898, it was one of the first "French flat" luxury apartment houses built in the city. The building was listed on the National Register of Historic Places in 1986.

According to a promotional booklet published in 1899, it was constructed 25 feet from its adjoining apartment block, The Dunvegan, with which it connects via an underground passage. Both buildings are of the same height and similar size (six stories in height, with a frontage of eighty-five feet), built of the same materials, and with a similar architectural appearance, although the Montrose's floorplan is roughly rectangular but the Dunvegan's is triangular. The Montrose's vestibules, front hall, and stairway are finished in Siena marble, mahogany, and mosaic floors. Each of its twelve suites originally consisted of ten rooms and a bath, as follows: parlor, reception-room, library, dining-room, four bed rooms, kitchen and servant's room, bath room, servant's water-closet, and butler's pantry.

When constructed, the building was wired for door bells and electric lights, and piped for gas and hot and cold running water. Heating was provided by low-pressure steam.

== See also ==
- National Register of Historic Places listings in Cambridge, Massachusetts
