= Bolling–Gatewood House =

Historic house in Mississippi, United States

- U.S. Historic district – Contributing property
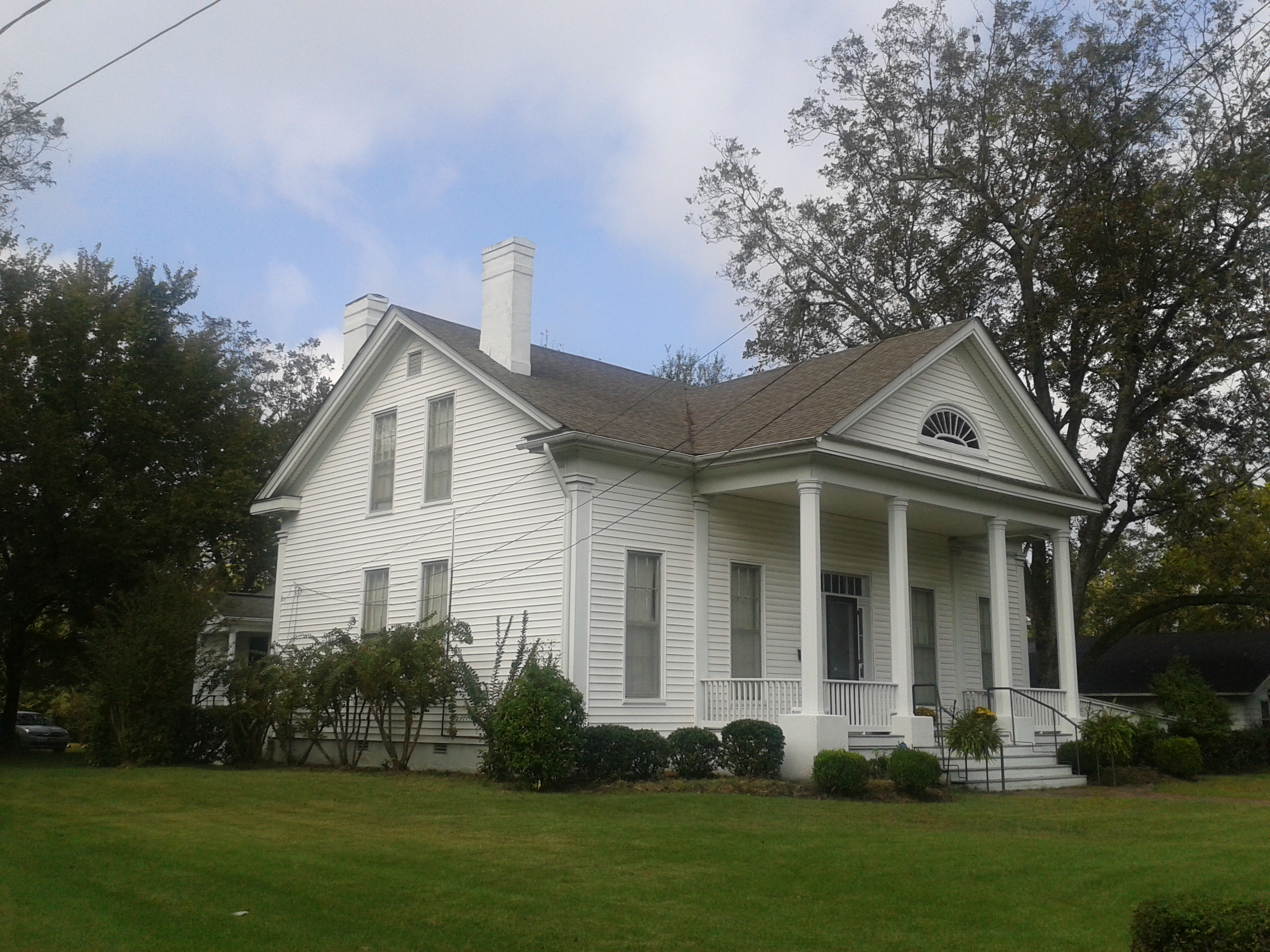
- The Bolling–Gatewood House in October 2017

- Location within Mississippi Location within the United States
- Interactive map showing the location for Bolling-Gatewood House
- Location: 220 Randolph Street North, Holly Springs, Marshall County, Mississippi, U.S.
- Coordinates: 34.7720°N 89.4451°W
- Built: 1858
- Architect: Spires Boling
- Architectural style: Greek Revival
- Part of: East Holly Springs Historic District (ID83000960)
- MPS: Holly Springs MRA
- Added to NRHP: April 20, 1983

The Bolling–Gatewood House is a historic cottage in Holly Springs, Mississippi, USA. It is home to the Ida B. Wells-Barnett Museum, named for former slave, journalist, and suffragist Ida B. Wells.

== Location ==
The house is located at 220 Randolph Street North in Holly Springs, a small town in northern Mississippi. It is off U.S. Route 78.

== History ==
The house was completed in 1858. It was designed as a two-storey wood cottage in the Greek Revival architectural style. The portico has five bays and octagonal columns. The cottage is white. It was built by Spires Boling (sometimes misspelled as Bolling), a master builder and later architect who designed it. Boling is also credited with White Pillars and Finley Place. Boling owned nine slaves, including Lizzie Wells and Ida B. Wells, who went on to become a renowned Civil Rights activist.

Later, the house became known as the Ida B. Wells-Barnett Museum. The museum presents "the contributions of African Americans in the fields of history, art and culture." In July 2013, three memorial trees were planted in the garden in honor of Wells's prominent grandchildren: Benjamin C. Duster III (1927–2011), an attorney; Charles E. Duster, Sr. (1929–1991), an architect; and Donald L. Duster (1932–2013), a business executive.

== Architectural significance ==
As a contributing property to the East Holly Springs Historic District, it has been listed on the National Register of Historic Places since April 20, 1983. Additionally, it has been a Mississippi Landmark since 2000.
