= Harvey Washington Walter =

American lawyer (1819-1878)

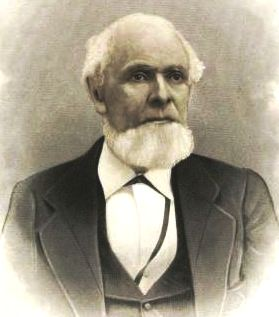
- Born: May 21, 1819; Lancaster, Fairfield, Ohio, U.S.
- Died: September 19, 1878 (aged 59); Holly Springs, Mississippi, U.S.
- Resting place: Hillcrest Cemetery
- Occupations: Lawyer, railroad executive
- Title: Colonel
- Spouse: Fredonia Brown
- Children: 4 sons, 3 daughters

Colonel Harvey Washington Walter (1819–1878) was an American lawyer and railroad business executive. He served as the President of the Mississippi Central Railroad. During the Civil War, he invited Union General Ulysses Grant and his wife, Julia Grant, to stay in his mansion, Walter Place. He succumbed to the yellow fever after turning it into a hospital for patients in 1878.

== Early life ==
Harvey Washington Walter was born in Fairfield, Ohio on May 21, 1819.

== Career ==
Walter moved to Holly Springs, Mississippi, where he practiced law. He also served as the president of the Mississippi Central Railroad.

During the Civil War, Colonel Walter served as a Judge Advocate under General Bragg in the Confederate States Army. However, he was staunchly opposed to secession, and he invited Union General Ulysses Grant and his wife, Julia Grant, to stay in his house for the duration of the war. According to Walter, when Confederate General Earl Van Dorn retook Holly Springs, Walter forbid him to enter the house until Julia Grant has gone out. To thank him, the Union Army did not ransack the house. Julia Dent Grant's version of this story, as published in her memoirs, differs slightly. She wrote that she had actually left Holly Springs and was enroute to join her husband when the Confederate soldiers took over the town. She goes on to say that Van Dorn's men wanted to take her belongings, but were refused access to the Walter's house, but they did burn her coach and take the horses. Van Dorn's intention was not to occupy the town but to destroy materiel that may have been of benefit to the Union troops and then withdraw.

In 1878, Walter turned his mansion into a hospital for patients with the yellow fever. He sent away his wife and youngest children, but his three sons remained to help. All four died of the disease within a week of each other.

== Personal life ==
Walter married Fredonia Brown (1830-1898). They had five sons and five daughters.

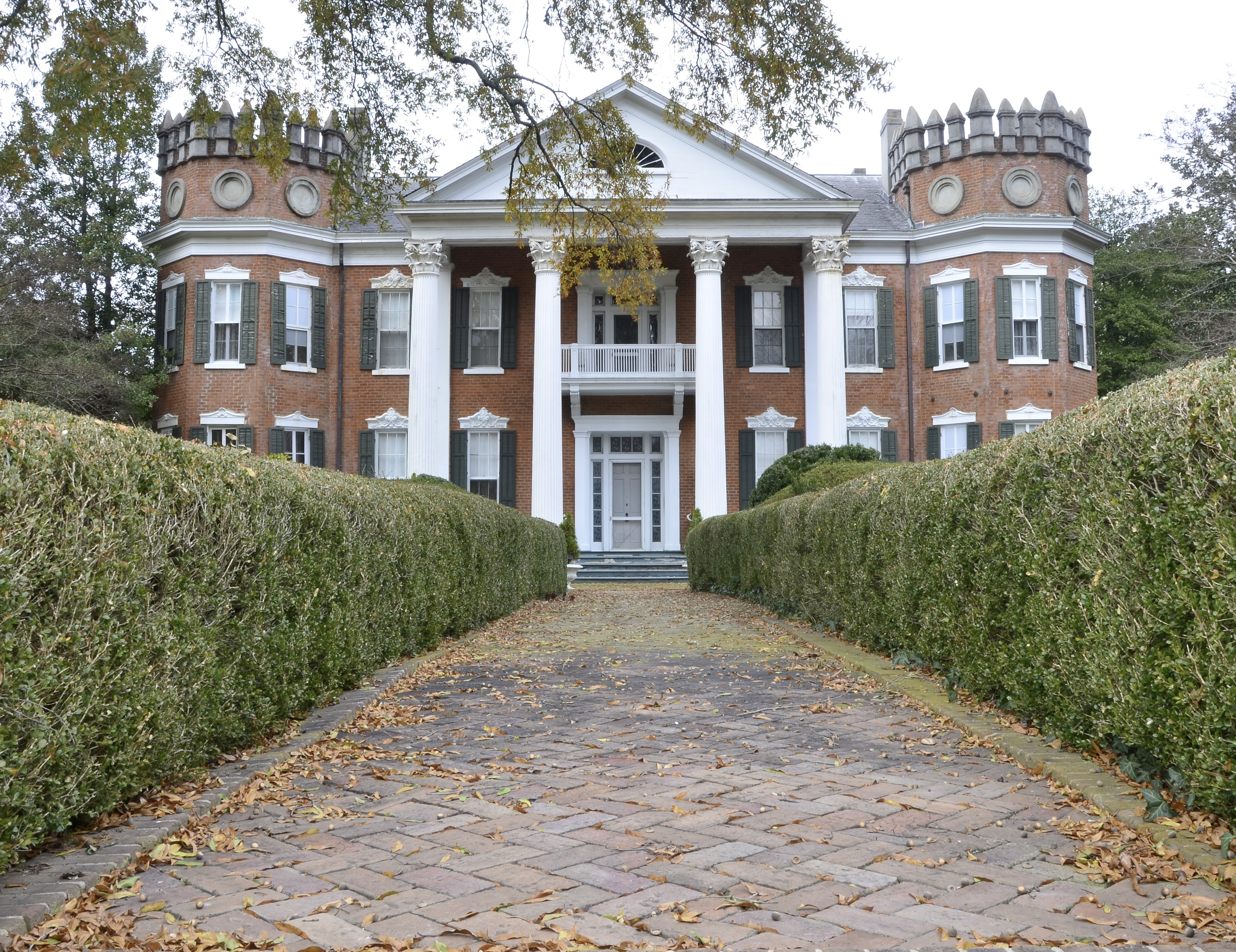
Walter Place.

In 1858–1860, he commissioned architect Spires Boling to build Walter Place, a mansion in Holly Springs, Mississippi.

== Death and legacy ==
Walter died of yellow fever in 1878. He was buried at the Hillcrest Cemetery in Holly Springs, Mississippi. His mansion, Walter Place, was inherited by his widow until it was acquired by his son-in-law, Oscar Johnson Sr., the co-founder of the International Shoe Company and husband of daughter Irene, in 1889.
