= RFA Fort Dunvegan =

1944 Fort-class stores ship of the Royal Fleet Auxiliary

History

United Kingdom
- Name: RFA Fort Dunvegan
- Launched: 28 February 1944
- Acquired: Transferred to the RFA on 19 March 1951
- Commissioned: 14 April 1944
- Decommissioned: 1968
- Fate: Scrapped at Kaohsiung in 1968

General characteristics
- Class & type: Fort class stores ship
- Tonnage: 7,243 GRT, 4,062 NRT, 6,711 DWT
- Length: 441 ft 6 in (134.57 m)
- Beam: 57 ft 2 in (17.42 m)
- Draught: 26 ft 11.5 in (8.22 m)
- Propulsion: 3 cyl triple expansion steam; 2,500 ihp (1,860 kW); One shaft.
- Speed: 11 knots (20 km/h)
- Range: 11,400 nautical miles (21,110 km) at 10 knots (19 km/h)
- Complement: 115
- Armament: During the Second World War: 1 × 4-inch (102 mm) gun; 8 × 20 mm A.A. guns

RFA Fort Dunvegan (A160) was a stores issuing ship of the Royal Fleet Auxiliary.
