= Montrose (Holly Springs, Mississippi) =

Historic house in Mississippi, United States

- U.S. Historic district – Contributing property
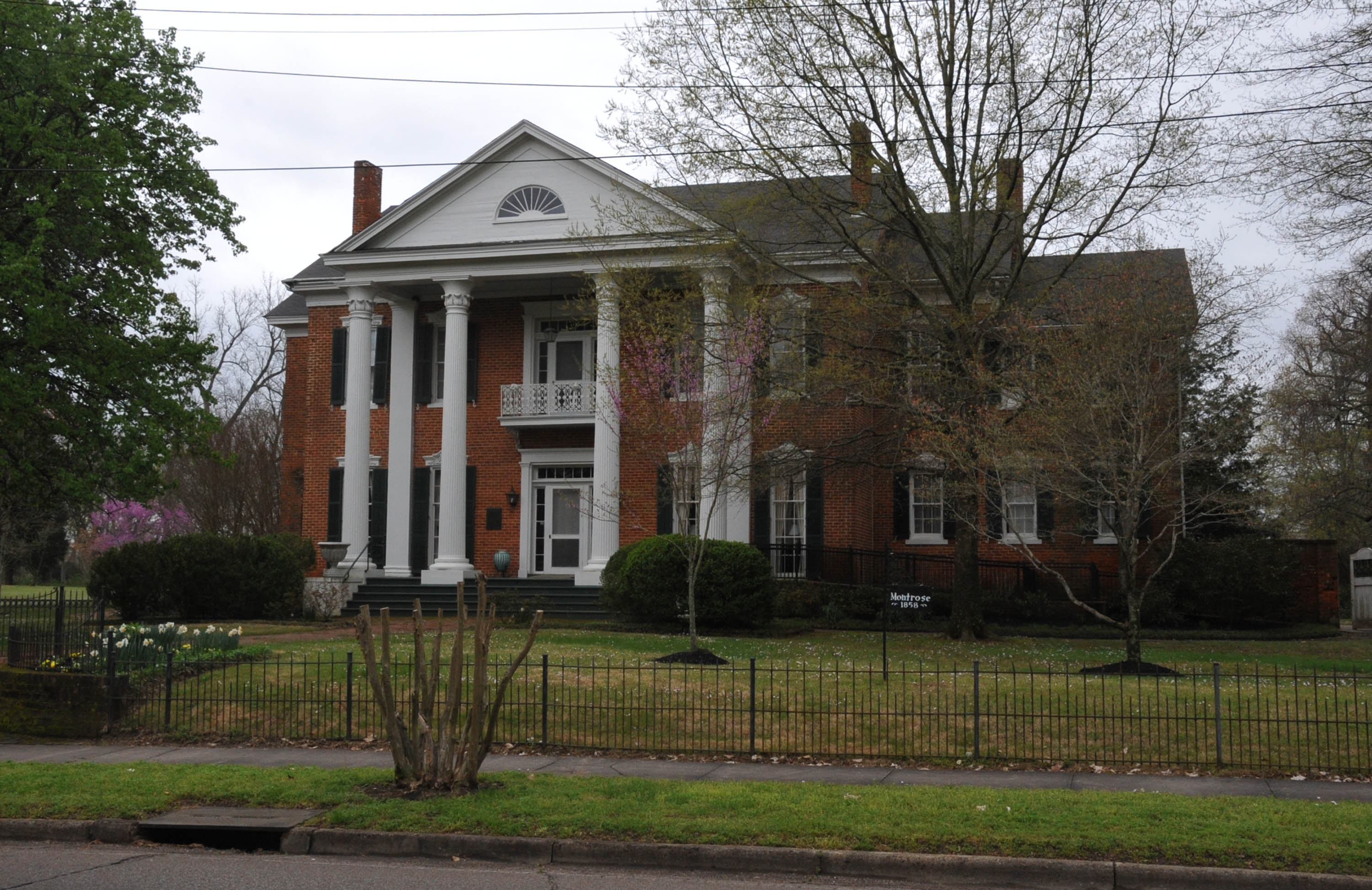
- Montrose in 2008
- Interactive map of Montrose
- Location: 335 East Salem Avenue, Holly Springs, Marshall County, Mississippi, U.S.
- Coordinates: 34°46′18.13″N 89°26′25.45″W
- Built: 1858
- Architectural style: Greek Revival
- Part of: East Holly Springs Historic District (ID83000960)
- Added to NRHP: April 20, 1983

Montrose is a historic mansion in Holly Springs, Mississippi, United States.

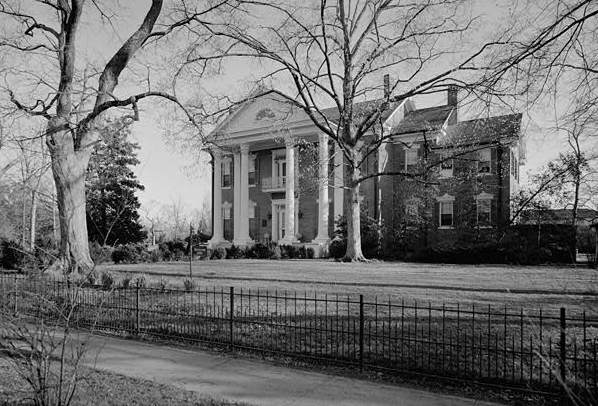
Montrose.

== Location ==
It is located at 335 East Salem Avenue in Holly Springs, a small town in Northern Mississippi.

== History ==
The mansion was commissioned by Alfred Aaron Brooks (1802-1888), a plantation owner, as a wedding present for his daughter. It was completed in 1858. It was designed in the Greek Revival architectural style, as a two-storey mansion with red bricks and white Corinthian columns. Inside, there is a circular staircase with a niche.

Later, it was home to the Holly Springs Garden Club, with an arboretum on the grounds.

The house may be toured during the annual Annual Pilgrimage and Home Tour. The proceeds go towards the restoration of the mansion.

== Architectural significance ==
As a contributing property to the East Holly Springs Historic District, it has been listed on the National Register of Historic Places since April 20, 1983. It has also been a Mississippi Landmark since 1986.
