= Walter Place (Holly Springs, Mississippi) =

Historic house in Mississippi, United States

- U.S. Historic district – Contributing property
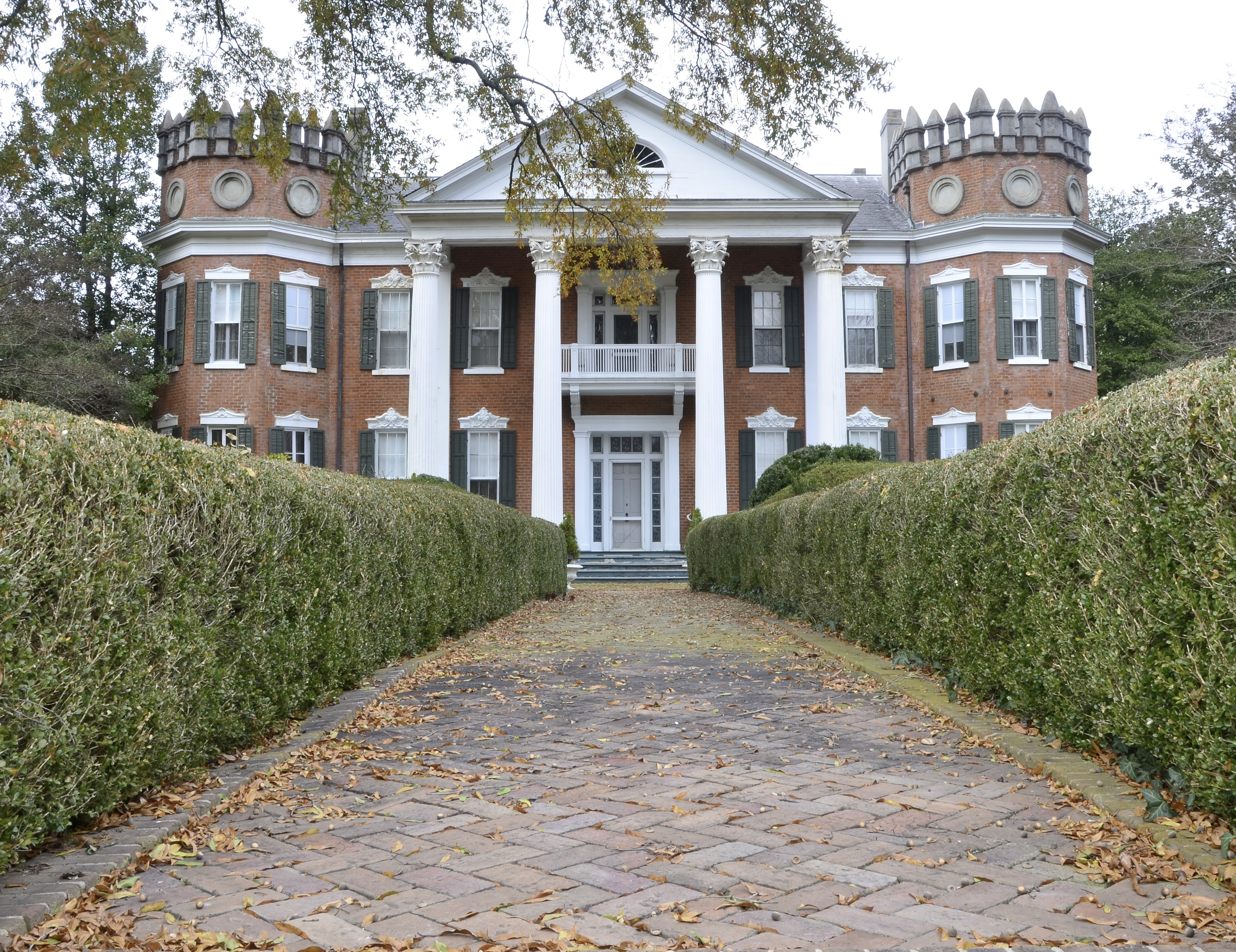
- Walter Place in 2014

- Location within Mississippi Location within the United States
- Location: 300 West Chulahoma Avenue, Holly Springs, Mississippi, U.S.
- Coordinates: 34°45′58.2″N 89°27′17.1″W
- Built: 1860; 1903
- Architects: Spires Boling; Theodore C. Link
- Architectural style: Greek Revival, Gothic Revival
- Part of: Southwest Holly Springs Historic District (ID83000963)
- Added to NRHP: April 20, 1983

Walter Place is a historic mansion in Holly Springs, Mississippi, United States. Built in 1860 for pro-Union Harvey Washington Walter, the President of the Mississippi Central Railroad. The mansion was the temporary home of Union General Ulysses Grant and his wife Julia Grant during part of the American Civil War. Later, it was the summer residence of Oscar Johnson, Jr., the co-founder of the International Shoe Company. A combination of Greek Revival and Gothic Revival architectural styles, it was the most expensive house in Mississippi on the market in 2011.

== Location ==
The mansion is located at 300 West Chulahoma Avenue in Holly Springs, a small city in Marshall County, Northern Mississippi.

== History ==
Construction on the two-storey mansion began in 1857, and it was completed in 1860. The architect was Spires Boling.The design has been interpreted as a combination of Greek Revival and Gothic Revival architectural styles. It has a portico with four Corinthian columns flanked by crenellated octagonal turrets on both sides. The tympanum of each tower has lunette windows.

It was built for Colonel Harvey Washington Walter, a lawyer who served as the President of the Mississippi Central Railroad. During the American Civil War of 1861–1865, Walter, who was opposed to secession, invited Union General Ulysses Grant to live in the house. As Confederate General Earl Van Dorn liberated Holly Springs, he was not permitted to enter the house until Julia Grant had gone outside. Moreover, the house could not be ransacked. As a result, it was used by Confederate personnel and intelligence officers.

Other sources, including Julia Grant's memoirs, give a slightly different version of events saying that she had left Holly Springs before Van Dorn and his troops arrived. Some of the troops attempted to remove her personal belongings from the house, but were prevented by Mrs. Pugh Govan, who was looking after Walter Place. Julia Grant's carriage was burned and her horses taken, but this would have been in line with Van Dorn's plan to remove or destroy anything in the area that may have benefited the Union army.

A decade later, during the yellow fever epidemic of 1878, the mansion was used as a quarantine hospital for patients. Colonel Walter and three of his sons died from the disease that year and the mansion was then inherited by his widow, Fredonia. In 1889, it was purchased by her son-in-law, Oscar Johnson, husband of daughter Irene. Johnson was a co-founder of Roberts, Johnson & Rand Shoe Company, a shoe company in St. Louis, Missouri later known as the International Shoe Company. The Johnsons added a formal landscape garden and summered at the mansion. In 1903, they hired German-born architect Theodore C. Link to remodel the house.

In 1918, two years after Johnson's death, his widow sold the house to A. M. Green. Green, who was a Ford car dealer, redeveloped the garden. However, by 1934, Johnson's children purchased the property again at an auction, for US$4,000. However, it was mostly lived in by hired help. In 1983 the property was acquired by Minnesota Vikings general manager Mike Lynn and his wife Jorja. The Lynns fulfilled the ambition of former owner Oscar Johnson by adding a walking park with water features and botanical gardens on an adjacent piece of property. They also acquired Featherston Place and Polk Place. It was listed as the most expensive house in Mississippi in 2011, for US$15 million (~$21.1 million in 2025). Mike Lynn died on July 21, 2012. In 2014, Jorja Lynn placed all three of the estates on the market and auctioned off all of the furnishings and valuables. In 2019, Walter Place was purchased by Terry Cook who has begun restoring the mansion. In 2026, new ownership opened Walter Place as a wedding venue and Bed & Breakfast. Walter place has opened up the property for tours and photography secessions as well.

== Architectural significance ==
As a contributing property to the Southwest Holly Springs Historic District, it has been listed on the National Register of Historic Places since April 20, 1983.
