= Hubert Horton McAlexander =

Scholar of Southern literature and culture

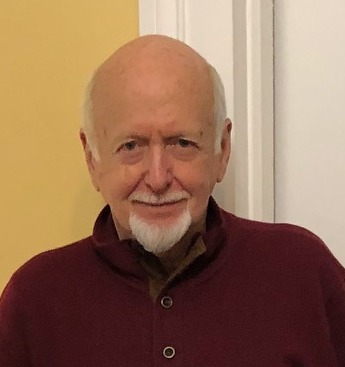
Hubert McAlexander, 2020

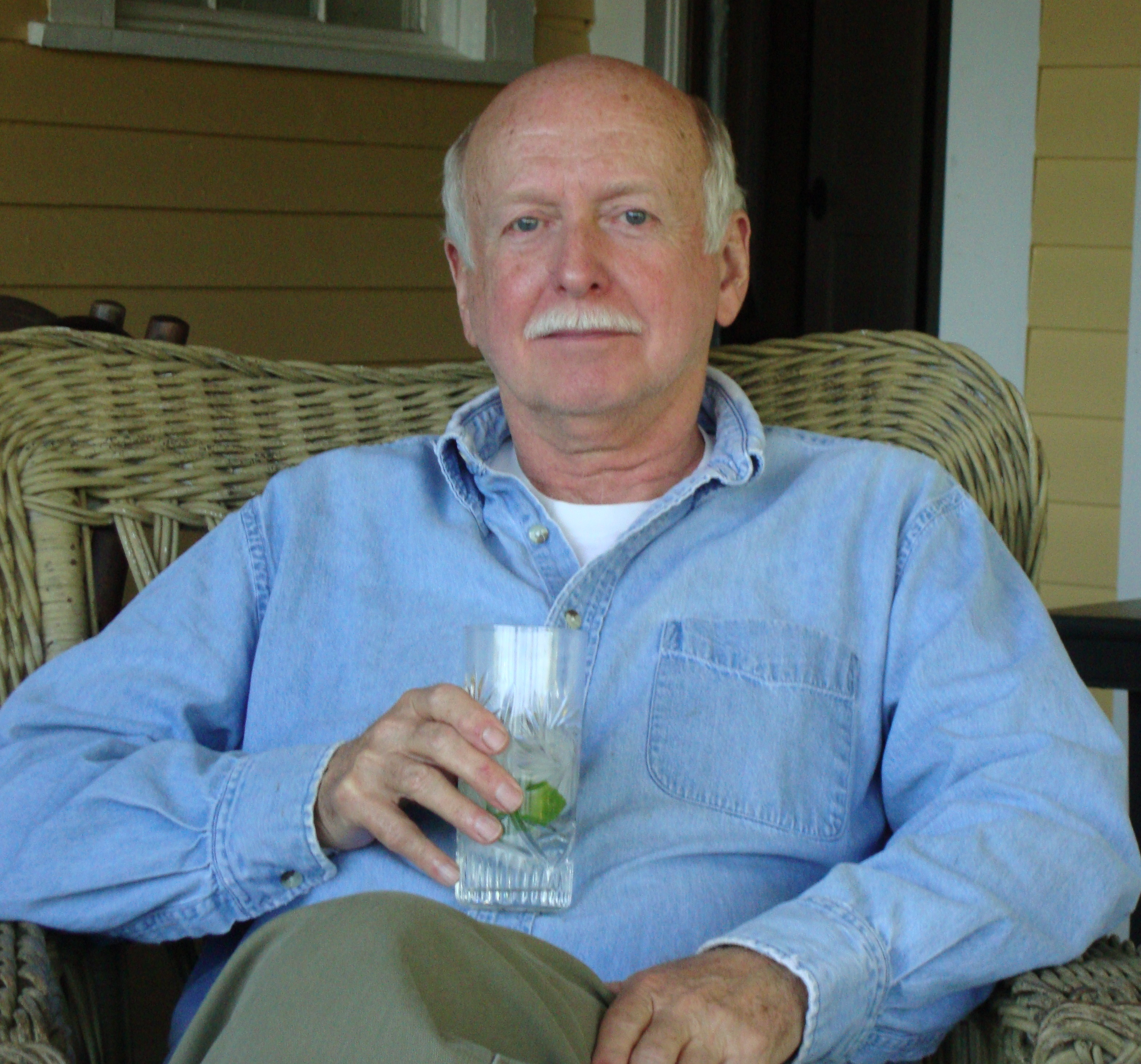
Hubert McAlexander at home, 2010

Hubert Horton McAlexander (born October 27, 1939) is a scholar of Southern literature and culture and a Josiah Meigs Professor Emeritus in the University of Georgia's department of English. In addition to numerous articles on William Faulkner and other nineteenth- and twentieth-century Southern authors, he wrote biographies of Sherwood Bonner and Peter Taylor and edited a collection of critical essays on Taylor and a volume of interviews with Taylor. He has also published books and articles on regional history, especially the region of northern Mississippi that inspired William Faulkner's fiction.

== Early life ==
McAlexander was born in Holly Springs, Mississippi. He attended the University of Mississippi, where he received his B.A. and M.A. degrees, before earning his doctoral degree in American Literature at the University of Wisconsin in 1973, with a dissertation on William Faulkner. He taught at Texas A&M University for one year before joining the faculty at the University of Georgia in 1974.

== Career ==
In 1981 McAlexander published the first in-depth biography of Sherwood Bonner, a nineteenth-century author from Mississippi who defied social pressures and a privileged upbringing to leave her family and embark on a literary career. The book was reissued in 1999. Throughout the 1980s and 1990s, much of his research focused on Peter Taylor, the Pulitzer Prize-winning fiction writer from Tennessee. This work culminated in his 2001 biography Peter Taylor: A Writer's Life, which Publishers Weekly described as a meticulous account. An excerpt was published in the New York Times. At UGA he regularly taught courses in Southern Literature, American Realism, and American Modernism, and on the authors William Faulkner, Henry James, and Willa Cather. His 2017 edited collection From the Chickasaw Cession to Yoknapatawpha: Historical Essays on North Mississippi examines the Native American, African-American, and European-American communities that shaped the region around Oxford, Mississippi, which William Faulkner fictionalized as "Yoknapatawpha County". He was honored as Outstanding Honors Professor in multiple years and won the Josiah Meigs Award for Excellence in Teaching and the Creative Research Medal. In 2020, an endowed chair was created in his name in the University of Mississippi's department of English. The first recipient of the chair is author Kiese Laymon.

== Bibliography ==
- From the Chickasaw Cession to Yoknapatawhpa: Historical Essays on North Mississippi (Nautilus Publishing Company, 2017)
- Strawberry Plains Audubon Center: Four Centuries of a Mississippi Landscape (University Press of Mississippi, 2008)
- Peter Taylor: A Writer's Life (Louisiana State University Press, 2001)
- A Southern Tapestry: Marshall County, Mississippi, 1835-2000 (Donning Publishing Co., 2000)
- Editor, Critical Essays on Peter Taylor (G. K. Hall, 1993)
- Editor, Conversations with Peter Taylor (University Press of Mississippi, 1987)
- Prodigal Daughter: A Biography of Sherwood Bonner (1981)
