= The Dunvegan =

- U.S. National Register of Historic Places
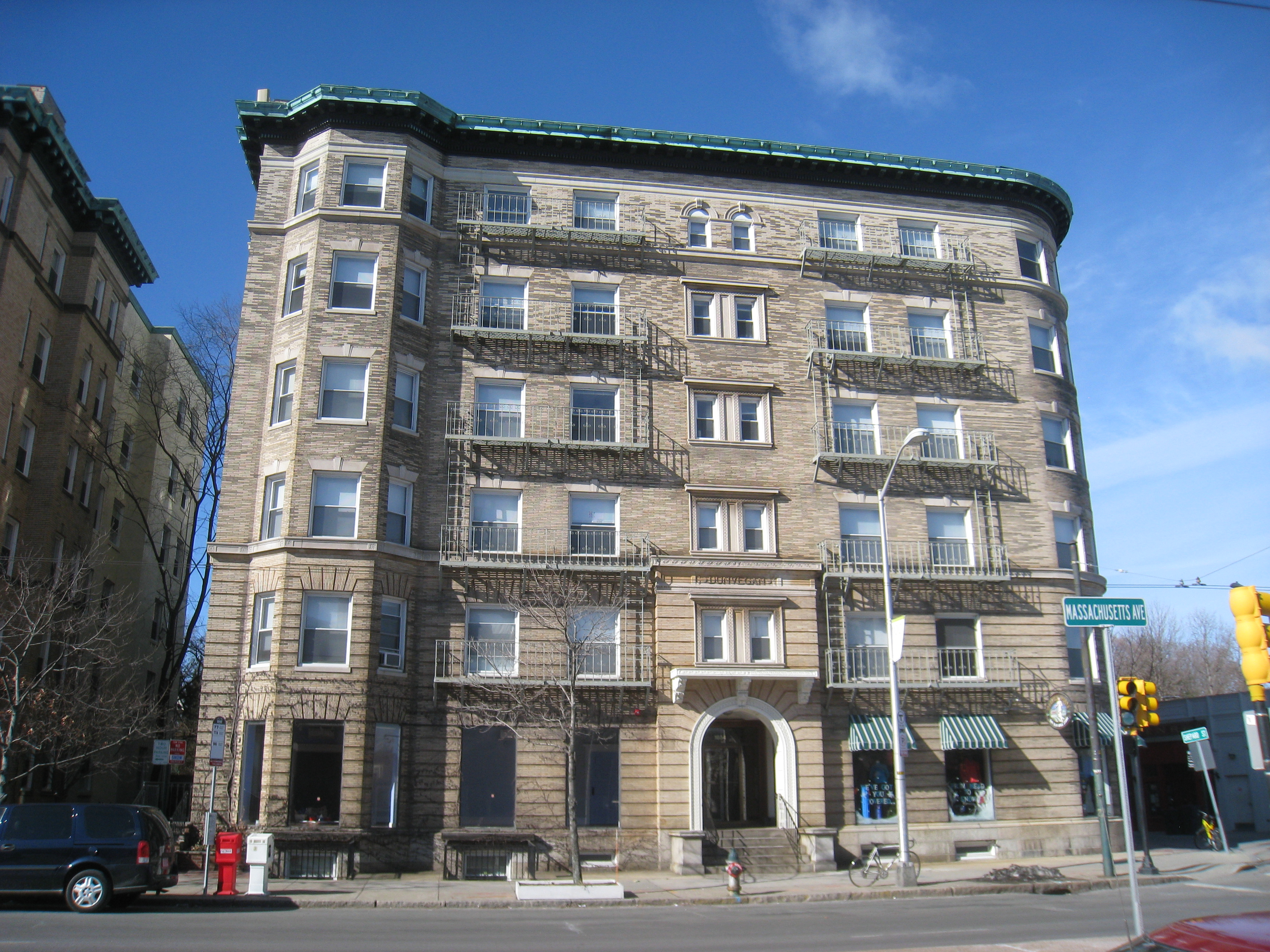

- Location within Massachusetts Location within the United States
- Location: 1654 Massachusetts Avenue, Cambridge, Massachusetts
- Coordinates: 42°22′53.8″N 71°7′12.1″W
- Built: 1898
- Architect: W.M. Bacon
- Architectural style: Renaissance
- MPS: Cambridge MRA
- NRHP reference No.: 86001279
- Added to NRHP: May 19, 1986

The Dunvegan is an historic apartment building in Cambridge, Massachusetts. It was built in 1898 and added to the National Register of Historic Places in 1986.

According to a promotional booklet published in 1899, its name is derived from that of Scotland's Dunvegan Castle, whose coat of arms is worked into the apartment's stained glass windows. It was constructed 25 feet from its adjoining apartment block, The Montrose, with which it connects via an underground passage. Both buildings are of the same height and similar size (six stories, with a frontage of eighty-five feet), built of the same materials, and with a similar architectural appearance, although the Montrose's floorplan is roughly rectangular but the Dunvegan's is triangular.

The Dunvegan's vestibules, front hall, and stairway are finished in Siena marble, mahogany, and mosaic floors. Each of its twelve suites originally consisted of ten rooms and a bath, as follows: parlor, reception room, library, dining room, four bedrooms, kitchen and servant's room, bathroom, servant's water closet, and butler's pantry. The building also contained twelve bachelor suites of two rooms and a bath apiece.

When constructed, the building was wired for doorbells and electric lights, and piped for gas and hot and cold running water. Heating was provided by low-pressure steam.

In the 1930s the buildings were reworked into one-bedroom and two-bedroom apartments. The buildings are now served by Best Choice Apartments Shortill Realty. The firm is located on the first floor of the Montrose Building. The buildings have been well cared for and many original details remain.

== See also ==
- National Register of Historic Places listings in Cambridge, Massachusetts
