= Holly Springs, Mississippi =

- City
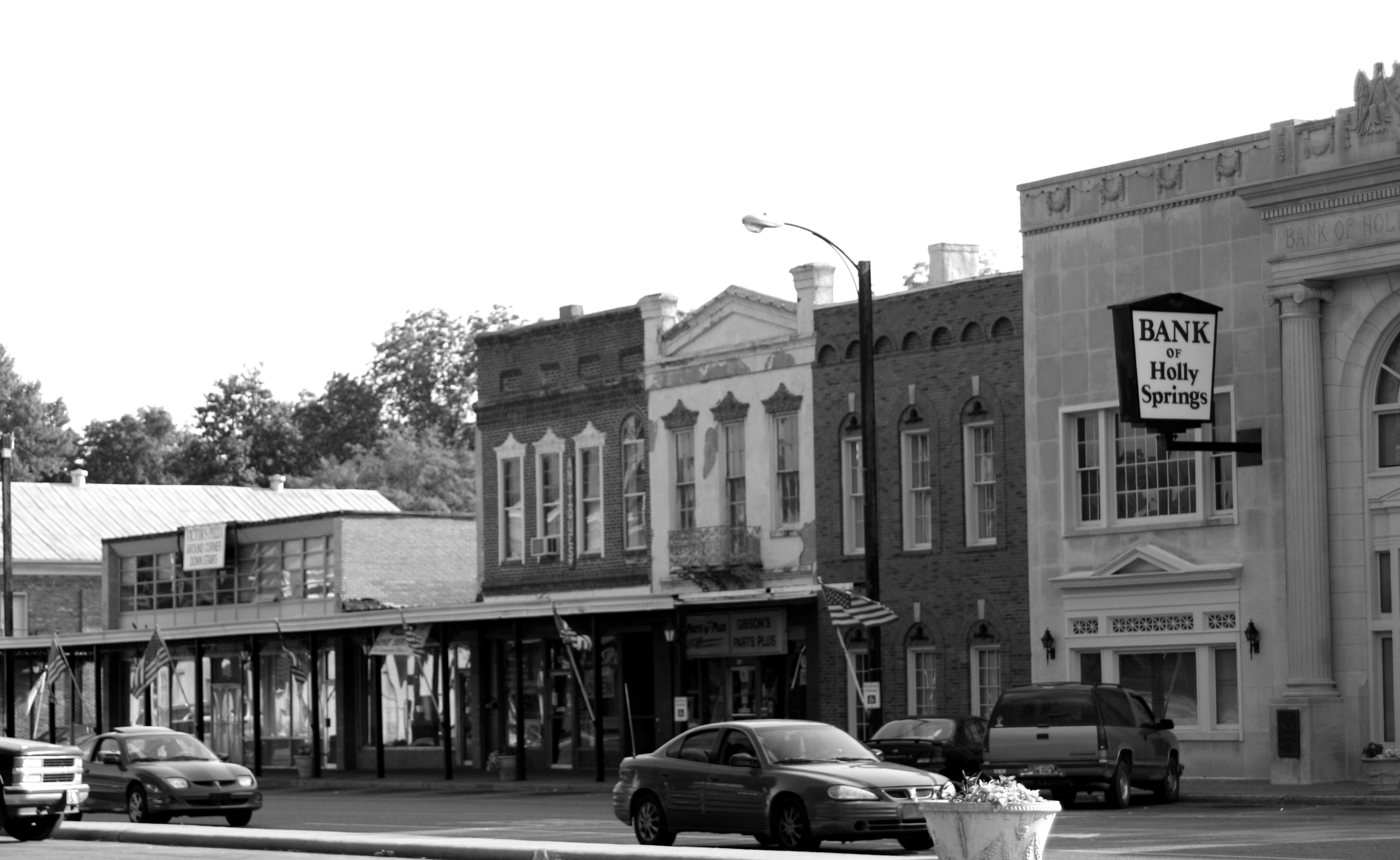
- Business district of Holly Springs in 2007

- Flag Logo

- Location in Marshall County and the state of Mississippi

- Location in the United States
- Coordinates: 34°45′40″N 89°26′50″W
- Country: United States
- State: Mississippi
- County: Marshall

Government
  - Mayor: Charles Terry (D)

Area
  - Total: 12.80 sq mi (33.14 km^{2})
  - Land: 12.78 sq mi (33.09 km^{2})
  - Water: 0.019 sq mi (0.05 km^{2})
- Elevation: 587 ft (179 m)

Population (2020)
  - Total: 6,968
  - Density: 545.3/sq mi (210.56/km^{2})
- Time zone: UTC-6 (Central (CST))
  - Summer (DST): UTC-5 (CDT)
- ZIP codes: 38634, 38635, 38649
- Area code: 662
- FIPS code: 28-33100
- GNIS feature ID: 2404717
- Website: hollyspringsms.gov

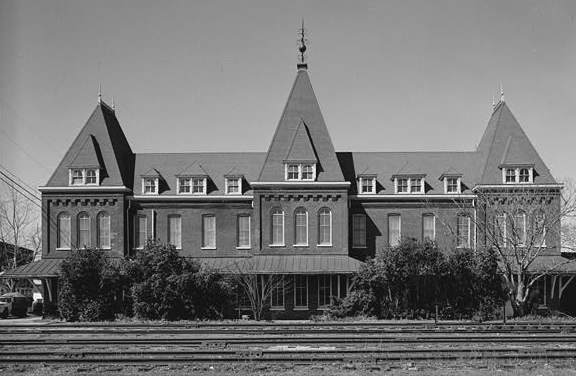
Holly Springs railroad depot

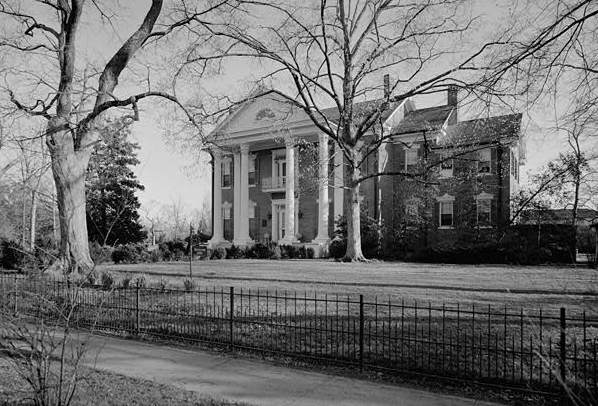
Montrose, an antebellum mansion in Holly Springs

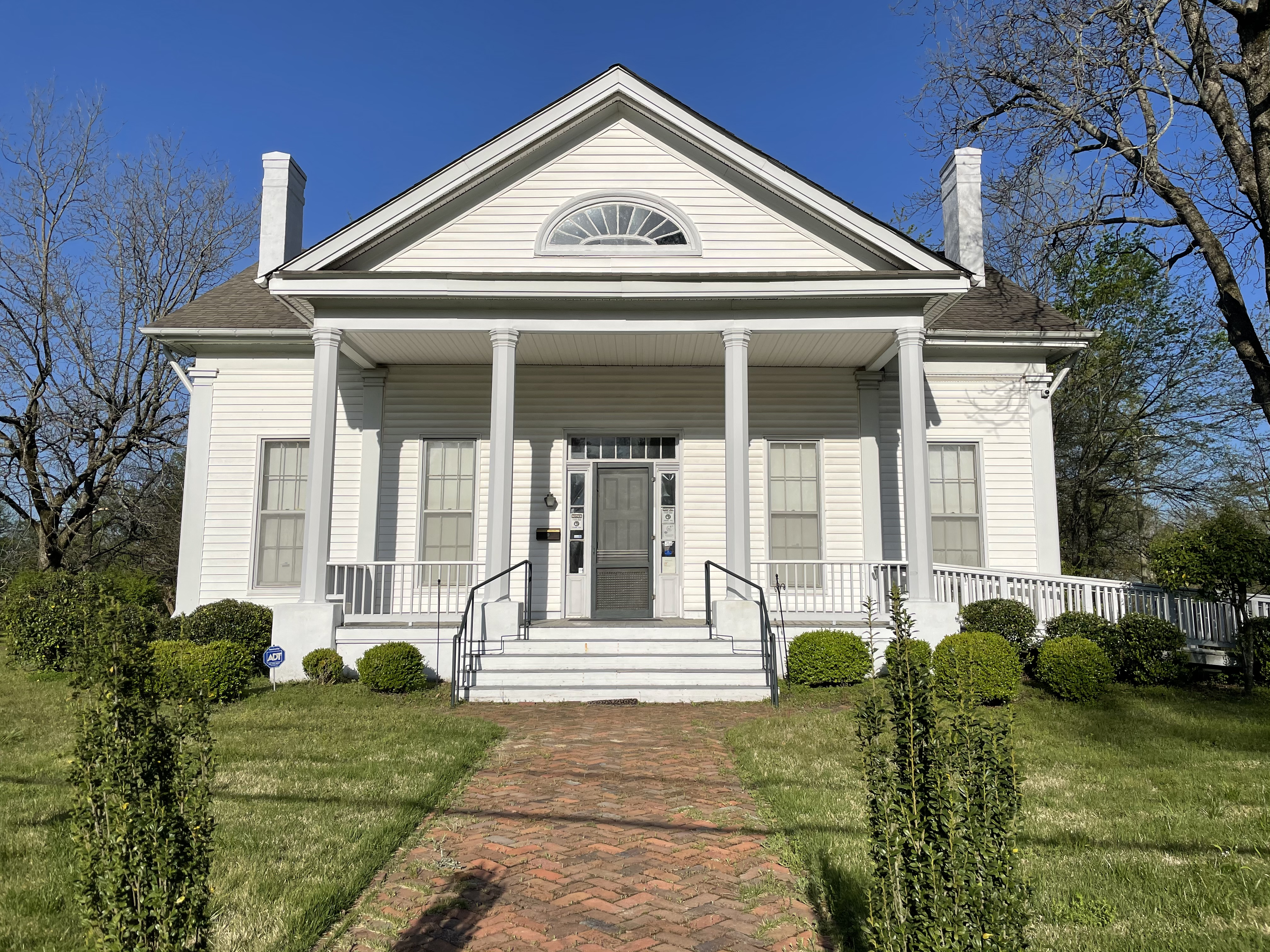
The Bolling–Gatewood House, home to Ida B. Wells

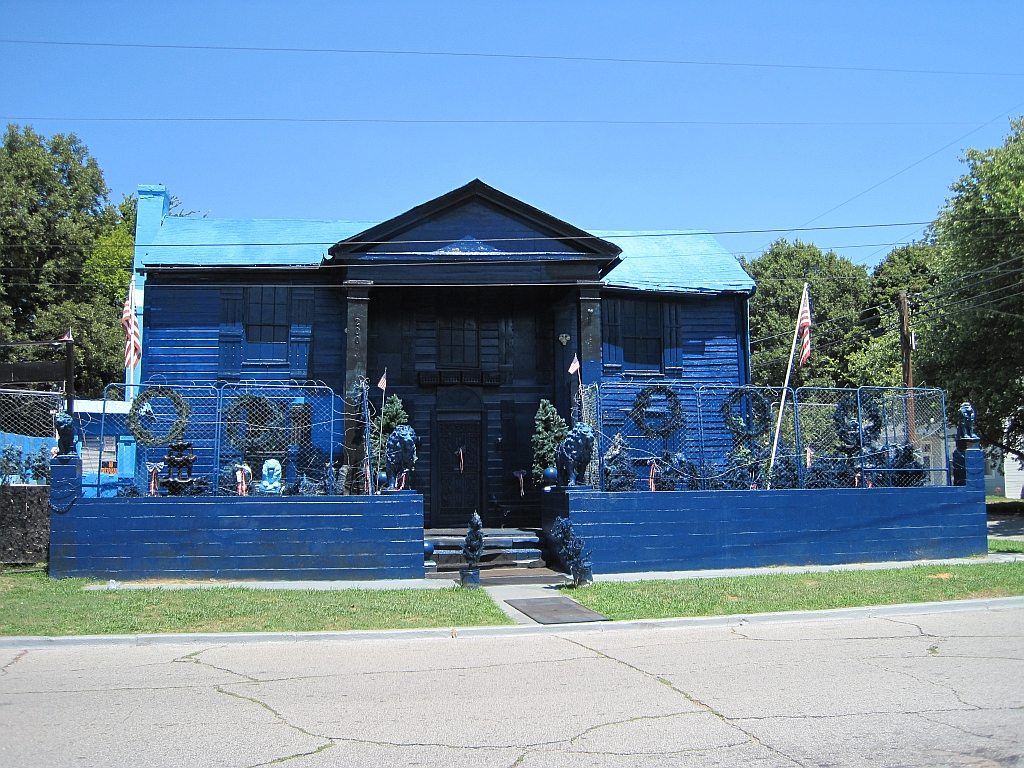
Graceland Too in Holly Springs

Holly Springs is a city in and the county seat of Marshall County, Mississippi, United States, near the border with Tennessee to the north. As of the 2020 census, the population was 6,968, down from 7,699 in 2010. Along with the Mississippi Delta, in the 19th century, the area was developed for cotton plantations. After the Civil War, many freedmen continued to work in agriculture as sharecroppers and tenant farmers.

As the county seat, Holly Springs is a center of trade and court sessions. The city has several National Register of Historic Places-listed properties and historic districts, including the Southwest Holly Springs Historic District, Holly Springs Courthouse Square Historic District, Depot-Compress Historic District, and East Holly Springs Historic District. Hillcrest Cemetery contains the graves of five Confederate generals and has been called "Little Arlington of the South".

== History ==
European Americans founded Holly Springs in 1836 on territory occupied by the Chickasaw people for centuries before Indian Removal. Most of their land was ceded under the Treaty of Pontotoc Creek of 1832. Many early U.S. migrants were from Virginia, supplemented by migrants from Georgia and the Carolinas.

In 1836, the city had 4,000 European-American residents. A year later, records show that 40 residents were lawyers, and there were six physicians by 1838. By 1837, the town already had "twenty dry goods stores, two drugstores, three banks, several hotels, and over ten saloons." Hillcrest Cemetery was built on land settler William S. Randolph gave the city in 1837.

Newcomers established the Chalmers Institute, later known as the University of Holly Springs, Mississippi's oldest university.

The area was developed with extensive cotton plantations dependent on the labor of enslaved African Americans. Many had been transported from the Upper South in the domestic slave trade, breaking up families. Holly Springs served as a trading center for the neighboring cotton plantations. In 1837, it was made seat of the newly created Marshall County, named for John Marshall, the Supreme Court justice. The town developed a variety of merchants and businesses to support the plantations. Its population into the early twentieth century included a community of Jewish merchants, whose ancestors were immigrants from eastern Europe in the 19th century. The cotton industry suffered in the crisis of 1840, but soon recovered.

By 1855 Holly Springs was connected to Grand Junction, Tennessee, by the Mississippi Central Railway. In ensuing years, the line was completed to the south of Hill Springs. Toward the end of the 19th century, the Kansas City, Memphis and Birmingham Railroad was constructed to intersect this line in Holly Springs.

During the Civil War, Union general Ulysses S. Grant temporarily used Holly Springs as a supply depot and headquarters while mounting an effort to take the city of Vicksburg. Confederate general Earl Van Dorn led the successful Holly Springs Raid on the town in December 1862, destroying most of the Union supplies at the Confederate Armory Site. The campus of the Holly Springs Female Institute, which had been open since 1836, was also burned, forcing it to permanently close. Grant eventually succeeded in ending the siege of Vicksburg with a Union victory.

In 1878, Holly Springs suffered a yellow fever epidemic, part of a regional epidemic; 1,400 residents became ill and 300 died. The Marshall County courthouse, at the center of Holly Springs's square, was used as a hospital during the epidemic.

After the war and emancipation, many freedmen stayed in the area, working as sharecroppers on former plantations. There were tensions after the war.

As agriculture was mechanized in the early 20th century, there were fewer farm labor jobs. From 1900 to 1910, a quarter of the population left the city. Many blacks moved to the North in the Great Migration to escape southern oppression and seek employment in northern factories. The invasion of boll weevils in the 1920s and 1930s, which occurred across the South, destroyed the cotton crops and caused economic problems on top of the Great Depression. Some light industry developed in the area. After World War II, most industries moved to the major cities of Memphis, Tennessee, and Birmingham, Alabama.

== Geography ==
Holly Springs is located slightly east of the geographic center of Marshall County. Interstate 22 runs along the southwest border of the city, with access from exits 26 and 30. I-22 leads northwest toward Memphis, Tennessee, 46 miles (74 km) distant, and southeast 60 miles (97 km) to Tupelo. State highways 4 and 7 pass through the center of Holly Springs on South Craft Street and North Memphis Street. Highway 4 leads east 18 miles (29 km) to Ashland and southwest 34 miles (55 km) to Senatobia, while Highway 7 leads south 30 miles (48 km) to Oxford and northeast toward Bolivar, Tennessee, 45 miles (72 km) distant.

According to the U.S. Census Bureau, Holly Springs has an area of 12.8 square miles (33 km^{2}), of which 0.02 square miles (0.05 km^{2}), or 0.15%, are water. The city sits on high ground that drains to the north and the west toward tributaries of the Coldwater River, and to the southeast toward Big Spring Creek, a tributary of the Little Tallahatchie River.

=== Climate ===
Holly Spring's climate is characterized by hot, humid summers and generally mild to cool winters. According to the Köppen Climate Classification system, Holly Springs has a humid subtropical climate. On December 23, 2015, a massive EF4 tornado struck the town around 6:00 pm, causing significant damage. James Richard Anderson, the Marshall County coroner, confirmed the boy's death. Nearly 200 Marshall County structures were damaged during the tornado, some totally.

Climate data for Holly Springs, Mississippi (1991–2020, extremes 1962–present)
Month	Jan	Feb	Mar	Apr	May	Jun	Jul	Aug	Sep	Oct	Nov	Dec	Year
Record high °F (°C)	78 (26)	81 (27)	86 (30)	92 (33)	95 (35)	103 (39)	106 (41)	105 (41)	101 (38)	93 (34)	88 (31)	78 (26)	106 (41)
Mean daily maximum °F (°C)	49.9 (9.9)	54.8 (12.7)	63.7 (17.6)	72.9 (22.7)	80.3 (26.8)	87.3 (30.7)	90.5 (32.5)	90.1 (32.3)	85.0 (29.4)	74.6 (23.7)	62.8 (17.1)	53.0 (11.7)	72.1 (22.3)
Daily mean °F (°C)	39.5 (4.2)	43.4 (6.3)	51.8 (11.0)	60.2 (15.7)	68.6 (20.3)	76.1 (24.5)	79.4 (26.3)	78.3 (25.7)	71.9 (22.2)	60.8 (16.0)	50.5 (10.3)	42.6 (5.9)	60.3 (15.7)
Mean daily minimum °F (°C)	29.2 (−1.6)	31.9 (−0.1)	39.8 (4.3)	47.4 (8.6)	56.9 (13.8)	65.0 (18.3)	68.4 (20.2)	66.5 (19.2)	58.8 (14.9)	47.1 (8.4)	38.2 (3.4)	32.1 (0.1)	48.4 (9.1)
Record low °F (°C)	−5 (−21)	0 (−18)	6 (−14)	23 (−5)	32 (0)	40 (4)	50 (10)	43 (6)	33 (1)	20 (−7)	11 (−12)	−12 (−24)	−12 (−24)
Average precipitation inches (mm)	4.69 (119)	4.93 (125)	6.09 (155)	6.09 (155)	5.43 (138)	4.71 (120)	4.58 (116)	3.35 (85)	3.94 (100)	4.24 (108)	4.46 (113)	5.66 (144)	58.17 (1,478)
Average snowfall inches (cm)	0.9 (2.3)	0.9 (2.3)	0.3 (0.76)	0.0 (0.0)	0.0 (0.0)	0.0 (0.0)	0.0 (0.0)	0.0 (0.0)	0.0 (0.0)	0.0 (0.0)	0.0 (0.0)	0.2 (0.51)	2.3 (5.8)
Average precipitation days (≥ 0.01 in)	11.4	9.4	10.7	10.0	10.1	8.7	9.5	7.6	7.4	7.7	9.2	11.2	112.9
Average snowy days (≥ 0.1 in)	0.4	0.4	0.2	0.0	0.0	0.0	0.0	0.0	0.0	0.0	0.0	0.1	1.1
Source: NOAA

== Demographics ==
Historical population
Census	Pop.	Note	%±
1860	2,987		—
1870	2,406		−19.5%
1880	2,370		−1.5%
1890	2,246		−5.2%
1900	2,815		25.3%
1910	2,192		−22.1%
1920	2,113		−3.6%
1930	2,271		7.5%
1940	2,750		21.1%
1950	3,276		19.1%
1960	5,621		71.6%
1970	5,728		1.9%
1980	7,285		27.2%
1990	7,261		−0.3%
2000	7,957		9.6%
2010	7,699		−3.2%
2020	6,968		−9.5%
U.S. Decennial Census

=== 2020 census ===
As of the 2020 census, Holly Springs had a population of 6,968. The median age was 37.2 years. 18.0% of residents were under the age of 18 and 15.1% of residents were 65 years of age or older. For every 100 females there were 105.5 males, and for every 100 females age 18 and over there were 108.5 males age 18 and over.

79.8% of residents lived in urban areas, while 20.2% lived in rural areas.

There were 2,202 households and 1,259 families in Holly Springs, of which 29.7% had children under the age of 18 living in them. Of all households, 24.4% were married-couple households, 18.2% were households with a male householder and no spouse or partner present, and 51.8% were households with a female householder and no spouse or partner present. About 34.3% of all households were made up of individuals and 14.9% had someone living alone who was 65 years of age or older.

There were 2,710 housing units, of which 18.7% were vacant. The homeowner vacancy rate was 1.7% and the rental vacancy rate was 26.7%.

Racial composition as of the 2020 census
Race	Number	Percent
White	1,206	17.3%
Black or African American	5,528	79.3%
American Indian and Alaska Native	8	0.1%
Asian	9	0.1%
Native Hawaiian and Other Pacific Islander	7	0.1%
Some other race	50	0.7%
Two or more races	160	2.3%
Hispanic or Latino (of any race)	74	1.1%

=== 2010 census ===
As of the 2010 United States census, there were 7,699 people living in the city, making it a minority-majority city: 79.2% of the residents were African American, 19.3% White, 0.2% Native American, 0.2% Asian, 0.6% from some other race, and 0.5% from two or more races. 1.2% were Hispanic or Latino of any race.

=== 2000 census ===
As of the census of 2000, there were 7,957 people, 2,407 households, and 1,699 families living in the city. The population density was 626.3 inhabitants per square mile (241.8/km^{2}). There were 2,582 housing units at an average density of 203.2 per square mile (78.5/km^{2}). The racial makeup of the city was 22.81% White, 76.18% African American, 0.06% Native American, 0.16% Asian, 0.03% Pacific Islander, 0.06% from other races, and 0.69% from two or more races. Hispanic or Latino of any race were 0.59% of the population.

There were 2,407 households, out of which 36.4% had children under the age of 18 living with them, 34.3% were married couples living together, 31.9% had a female householder with no husband present, and 29.4% were non-families. 27.2% of all households were made up of individuals, and 10.0% had someone living alone who was 65 years of age or older. The average household size was 2.66 and the average family size was 3.22.

In the city, the population was spread out, with 25.1% under the age of 18, 19.1% from 18 to 24, 27.6% from 25 to 44, 17.2% from 45 to 64, and 11.1% who were 65 years of age or older. The median age was 29 years. For every 100 females, there were 101.7 males. For every 100 females age 18 and over, there were 101.6 males.

The median income for a household in the city was $23,408, and the median income for a family was $25,808. Males had a median income of $29,159 versus $20,777 for females. The per capita income for the city was $12,924. About 27.5% of families and 32.0% of the population were below the poverty line, including 44.6% of those under age 18 and 21.2% of those age 65 or over.

== Education ==
The city is served by the Holly Springs School District. Marshall Academy is a private institution for the MPSA, offering K-4 through 12th grade.

Rust College was established in 1866 by the Freedman's Aid Society of the Methodist Episcopal Church to serve freedmen and is a historically black college.

The now defunct Mississippi Industrial College, intended as a vocational training school, was in Holly Springs, as was the Holly Springs Female Institute.

== Notable people ==
- Robert Reed Church (born 1839-1912), Entrepreneur
- Seth Adams (born 1985), University of Mississippi football quarterback
- Robert Belfour (1940-2015), blues musician
- Spires Boling (1812–1880), architect and builder
- R. L. Burnside (1926–2005), blues musician
- Kate Freeman Clark (1875–1957), painter
- Edward Hull "Boss" Crump (1874–1954), head of the dominant Democratic Party political machine in Memphis during the first half of the 20th century; born in Holly Springs
- Cassi Davis (born 1964), actress
- Clifton DeBerry (1924–2006), first African American nominated for President of the United States by a political party (Socialist Workers Party, 1964, 1980); born in Holly Springs
- Wall Doxey (1892–1962), Mississippi politician, served as congressman and U.S. senator; Wall Doxey State Park was named after him
- Charlie Feathers, (1932-1998), rockabilly musician
- Winfield S. Featherston (1820–1891), two-term member of United States House of Representatives, Confederate brigadier general during the Civil War, later a state politician and circuit court judge
- William Baskerville Hamilton (1908-1972), historian who taught public school in Holly Springs in the 1930s
- Syl Johnson (1936-2022), blues and soul singer
- Verina Morton Jones (1865–1943), African-American physician and the first woman to practice medicine in the state; served as resident physician at Rust College
- Junior Kimbrough (1930–1998), blues musician
- Jeremy LeSueur (born 1980), University of Michigan football defensive back
- Paul Maholm (born 1982), pitcher for four major league teams over his career
- Gary Montez Martin (1973–2019), perpetrator of the 2019 Aurora, Illinois shooting
- Mel and Tim (Mel Hardin and Tim McPherson), soul musicians from Holly Springs who recorded at Stax Records in Memphis
- Hiram Rhodes Revels (1822–1901), first African American to serve in the United States Senate; first president of Alcorn State University; taught theology at Shaw University (present-day Rust College)
- Lation Scott (1893-1917), African American lynching victim
- Shepard Smith (born 1964), American broadcast journalist for NBC News and CNBC; born in Holly Springs and attended high school at Marshall Academy, one of the private schools in town
- James F. Trotter (1802–1866), judge and U.S. senator who resided in Holly Springs until his death
- Irving Vendig (1902–1995), television writer
- Edward Cary Walthall (1831–1898), Confederate general, lawyer, and U.S. senator from Mississippi
- Ida B. Wells (1862–1931), African-American journalist, anti-lynching activist, and advocate for civil rights and women's rights; born in Holly Springs
- Absolom M. West (1818–1894), planter, politician, Civil War general and labor organizer, resided in Holly Springs after the Civil War until his death
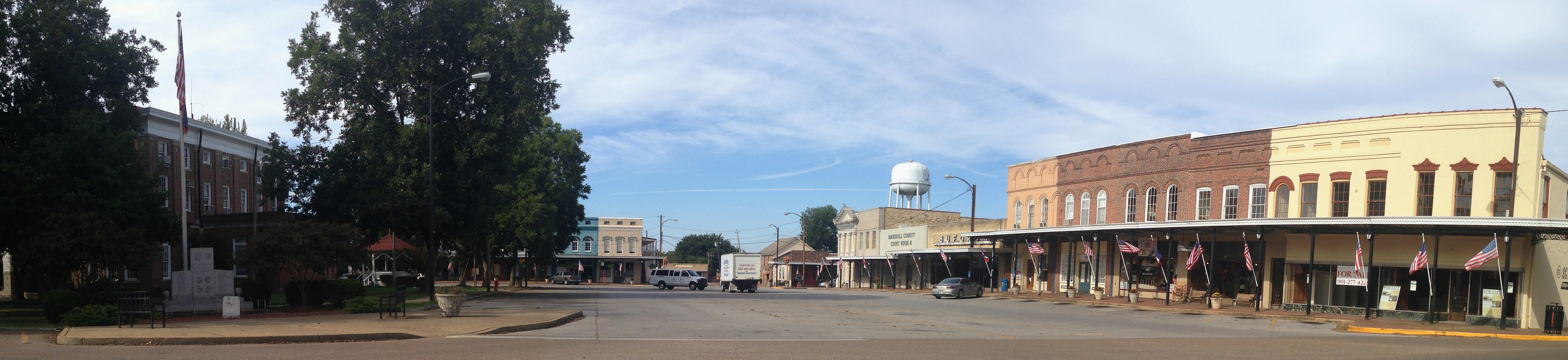
Town square in Holly Springs

== See also ==
- Strawberry Plains Audubon Center
