= The Webb School (Bell Buckle, Tennessee) =

American private preparatory school

Location
- 319 Webb Road East; Bell Buckle, Tennessee; United States; 35.5892°N 86.3471°W

Information
- Type: Private, college preparatory, boarding school
- Motto: Noli Res Subdole Facere ("Do Nothing On The Sly.")
- Established: 1870
- Founder: William R. "Sawney" Webb
- Headmaster: Polly Parker
- Grades: 6-12
- Enrollment: 405
- Colors: Navy blue and athletic gold (formerly purple and gold)
- Mascot: The Webb Feet (formerly, "The Webb Tigers, The Webb Ropers")
- Nickname: Webb
- Website: www.thewebbschool.com

The Webb School is a private coeducational college preparatory boarding and day school in Bell Buckle, Tennessee, founded in 1870. It has been called the oldest continuously operating boarding school in the South.

== Mission ==
As expressed by William R. Webb, the school's mission is "To turn out young people who are tireless workers and who know how to work effectively; who are accurate scholars, who know the finer points of morals and practice them in their daily living; who are always courteous [without the slightest trace of snobbery]." (Bracketed text was removed from the official mission of the school in the late 20th century but is commonly added to oral recitations by faculty and students.)

== History ==
William R. "Sawney" Webb started the Webb School as a school for boys in Culleoka, Tennessee, in 1870. He was joined by his brother, John M. Webb, in 1873.

After Vanderbilt University was founded in 1873, Webb School's "oldest and best boys" were able to enroll.

Webb moved the school from Culleoka to its present-day location, a 145-acre campus in the small town of Bell Buckle, in 1886 after Culleoka incorporated and legalized the sale of alcohol in the new city.

Sawney Webb's son W. R. Webb Jr., known as "Son Will", joined the school as a teacher in 1897 and became co-principal of the school with his father and uncle in 1908, unable to establish his own career. After their deaths (John Webb died in 1916 of a stroke and Sawney Webb in 1926 of old age), he became headmaster and remained in that position until his retirement in 1952.

Webb began admitting girls as boarding students in 1973, but earlier in its history Webb had allowed local girls to attend as day students.

== Notable alumni ==
- L. Desaix Anderson: career United States Foreign Service officer specializing in East Asian affairs, and former American Chargé d'Affaires ad interim to Vietnam
- Byron De La Beckwith, Ku Klux Klansman convicted of the assassination of civil rights leader Medgar Evers
- William West Bond: attorney and Speaker of the Tennessee State Senate (1921-1923)
- Lewis M. Branscomb: professor emeritus at Harvard Kennedy School
- Hayne D. Boyden: Naval aviator and Brigadier general, USMC
- Edward Ward Carmack: attorney, newspaper editor, and U.S. Senator (Tennessee)
- Robert Collins: American physician and pathologist
- Prentice Cooper: governor of Tennessee, 1939-1945
- Paul Craft: American country singer-songwriter
- Scott Crichton (class of 1972): associate justice of the Louisiana Supreme Court, 2015-2025
- Zach Curlin: American football and basketball player and coach
- Ewin L. Davis: chairman of the Federal Trade Commission
- Norman H. Davis: chairman of the American Red Cross; U.S. diplomat at 1918 Versailles Conference and 1933 Geneva Conference
- Harold Earthman: member of the U.S. House of Representatives
- William Eggleston: photographer
- William Yandell Elliott: Rhodes Scholar, Vanderbilt Fugitive, Harvard government professor, mentor of Henry Kissinger
- Charles Flexner: American physician, clinical pharmaceutical scientist, academic, author and researcher
- Robert J. Gilliland: pioneer of American aviation, chief test pilot and first to fly Lockheed SR-71 Blackbird.
- Andrew Glaze: award winning American poet and writer.
- Thomas Watt Gregory: Attorney General of the United States, 1914-1919
- Lauren Grissom: Miss Tennessee USA 2006
- J. B. Hildebrand: American college football player and coach and civil engineer
- Doug Holder: representative, Florida House of Representatives 2006-2014
- Keon Johnson: professional basketball player
- Jeffrey Lorberbaum: chairman and chief executive officer of Mohawk Industries
- William F. McCombs: chairman of the Democratic National Committee, 1912-1914
- Edwin Mims: chair of the English Department at Vanderbilt University, 1912-1942
- Frank Murrey: American college football player, track athlete, and banker
- Mary Brown Pharr: American classicist best known for her work with her husband Clyde Pharr on the translation of the Codex Theodosianus
- Edgar E. Rand: president of International Shoe Company, 1950-1955
- Frank C. Rand: president of International Shoe Company, 1916-1930; chairman 1930-1949
- Henry Hale Rand: president of International Shoe Company, 1955-1962
- John Andrew Rice: co-founder and first rector, Black Mountain College
- Wayne Rogers: screen actor, portrayed Trapper John on M*A*S*H; investment analyst for Fox News network
- Vermont C. Royster: editor of the Wall Street Journal, winner of two Pulitzer Prizes and the Presidential Medal of Freedom
- Manny Sethi: physician at Vanderbilt University Medical Center.
- Ingram M. Stainback: Governor of Hawaii, 1942-1951
- Allen Steele: Hugo Award-winning science fiction author
- Robert McGill Thomas, Jr.: Pulitzer Prize nominated reporter for The New York Times renowned for his obituaries, some of which are compiled in the book 52 McG's: The Best Obituaries from Legendary New York Times Writer Robert McG. Thomas Jr.
- Duncan L. Thompson: State Auditor of Mississippi 1912-1916
- John J. Tigert: first Rhodes Scholar from Tennessee, U.S. Commissioner of Education (1921–1928), third president of the University of Florida (1928–1947), member of the College Football Hall of Fame
- Paul Trousdale: American real estate developer best known for developing Trousdale Estates in Beverly Hills, California
- Elton Watkins: U.S. Congressman from Oregon 1923-1925
- Michael Tate Westbrook: commanding officer of the USS Spruance (DDG-111) 2010-2012
- Fielding L. Wright: governor of Mississippi, 1946-1952

== Related schools ==
Sawney Webb's son and grandson later established The Webb Schools in Claremont, California, and the Webb School of Knoxville in Knoxville, Tennessee, respectively.
