= Oscar Johnson (businessman) =

American businessman (1864-1916)

- Born: January 6, 1864; Senatobia, Mississippi, U.S.
- Died: July 28, 1916 (aged 52); St. Louis, Missouri, U.S.
- Resting place: Bellefontaine Cemetery
- Occupation: Businessman
- Spouse: Irene Walter
- Children: 2 sons, 1 daughter
- Relatives: Harvey Washington Walter (father-in-law); Frank C. Rand (cousin); Edgar E. Rand (nephew); Henry Hale Rand (nephew)

Oscar Johnson (January 6, 1864 – July 28, 1916) was an American businessman. He was the co-founder and president of the International Shoe Company, the largest shoe-manufacturing company in the world by the time of his death.

== Early life ==
Oscar Johnson was born circa 1863 in Senatobia, Mississippi. He was raised by an uncle in Holly Springs, Mississippi. He had a brother, Jackson Johnson (who went on to serve as the chairman of the International Shoe Company), and two sisters, Lillian Walter and Perle Dye of New Canaan, Connecticut.

== Career ==
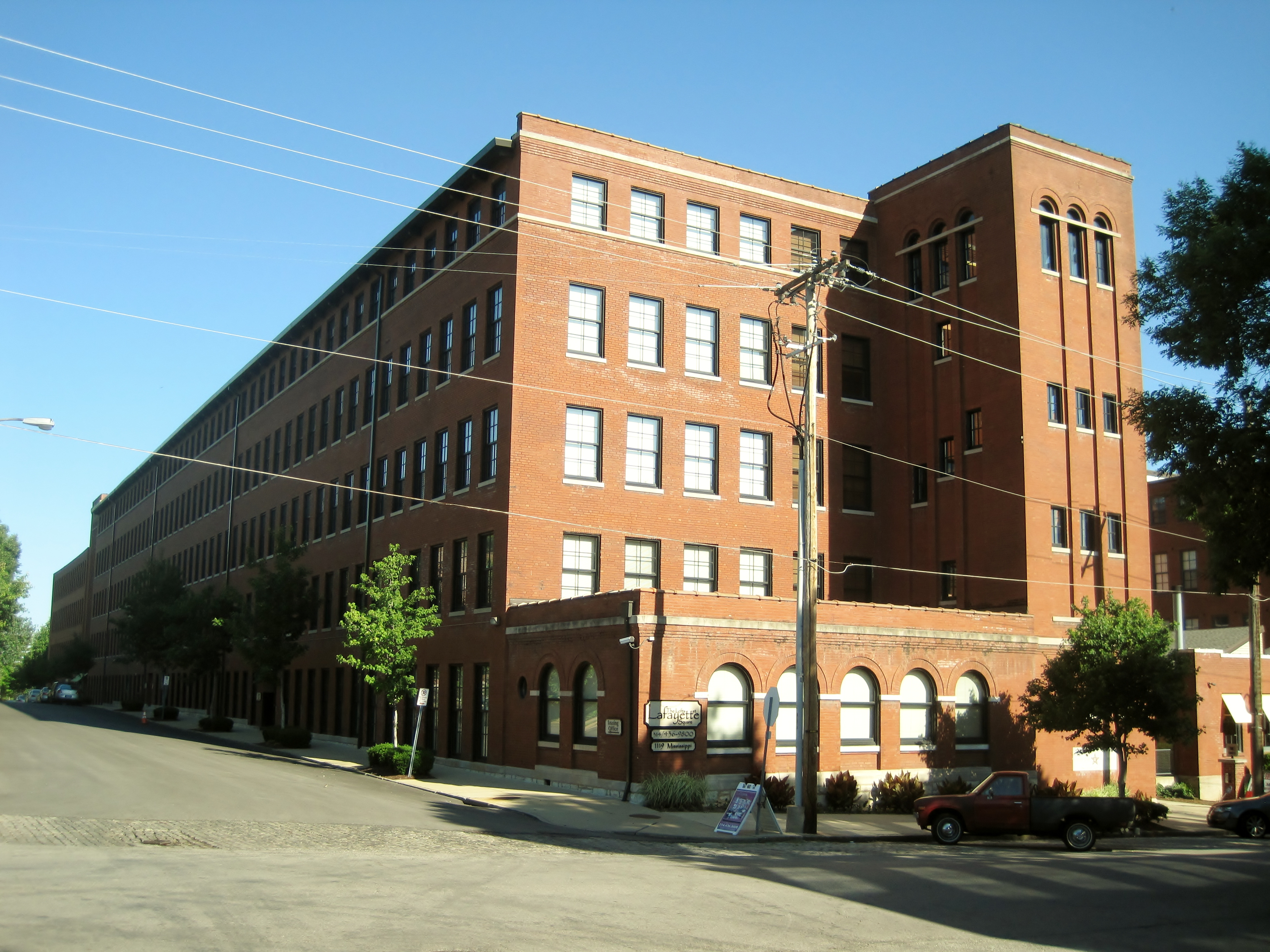
Roberts, Johnson and Rand-International Shoe Company Complex in St. Louis, Missouri.

Johnson first worked as a clerk in a country store.

With his brother Jackson Johnson and his cousins Edgar E. Rand and Frank C. Rand, Johnson co-founded Johnson, Carruthers & Rand Shoe Co. in Memphis, Tennessee in 1893. By 1908, they moved to St. Louis, where they co-founded the Roberts, Johnson & Rand Co. with John C. Roberts. In 1911, they acquired the Peters Shoe Co. It eventually became known as the International Shoe Company, and Johnson became its president, while his brother Jackson was its chairman. By the time of his death, the International Shoe Company had become the largest shoe manufacturing company in the world.

== Personal life and death ==
Johnson married to Irene Walter, the daughter of Confederate veteran Harvey Washington Walter, in 1889. They had two sons, Oscar Jr. and Lee, and a daughter, Fredonia. They resided at 28 Portland Place in St. Louis. They also owned a farm in Franklin County, Missouri. Additionally, they acquired Irene's family home, Walter Place in Holly Springs in 1889. He was a member of the Methodist Episcopal Church, South, the Noonday Club and the Ridgedale Country Club in Ridgedale, Missouri.

Johnson died on July 28, 1916, in St. Louis, and he was buried at the Bellefontaine Cemetery. Upon his death, he was worth an estimated $2,147,742. He was succeeded as president of the International Shoe Company by his cousin Frank C. Rand in November 1936.
