= Furnitureland South =

US furniture shop

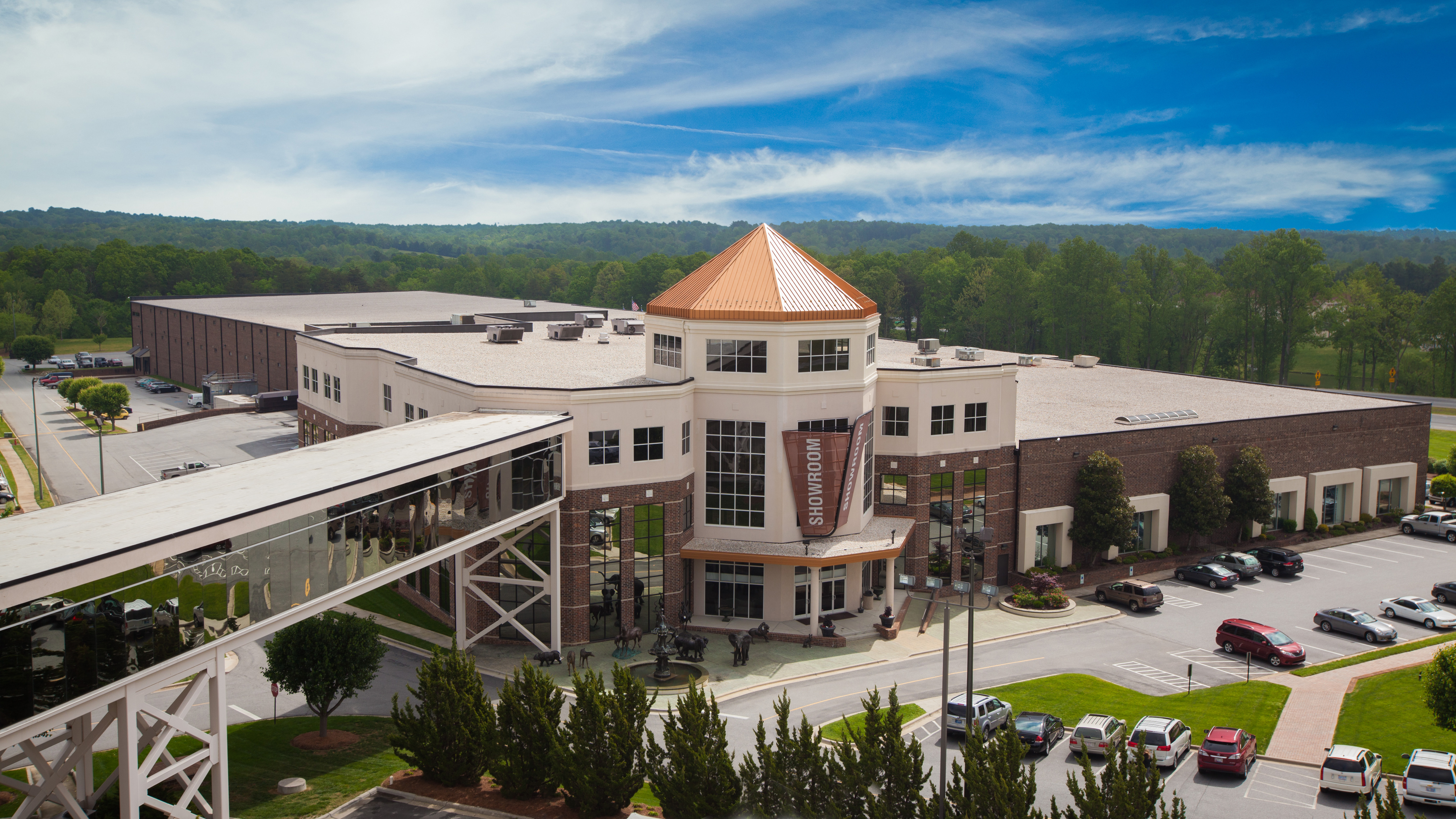
- Industry: Furniture; Home Decor; Beds & Mattresses; Design Consulting
- Founded: 1969; 57 years ago
- Founder: A. Darrell and Stella Harris
- Headquarters: Jamestown, North Carolina,
- Area served: Worldwide
- Products: Home Furnishings
- Brands: Baker; Hooker; Huntington House; Lexington; Stanley; American Drew; Others
- Owner: Jason Harris and Jeffrey Harris
- Number of employees: 550
- Website: www.furniturelandsouth.com

Furnitureland South in Jamestown, North Carolina is the largest retail furniture store in the United States with 1.3 million square feet and $180 million in sales as of 2004. Called "the Walt Disney World of Furniture", the store is known for its 85-foot-tall highboy, and is the first of the group of stores which in 2004 came to be known as "Furniture Row" as well as "Gateway to the Furniture Capital of the World."

== History ==
A. Darrell Harris founded Furnitureland South with his wife Stella on South Main Street in High Point, North Carolina in 1969, offering a small selection of market samples. Over the next two decades, the small operation grew in size, profits and prestige; in 1986, the original store had $18 million in annual sales. Harris built a furniture distribution center on 50 acres in Jamestown at Interstate 85 Business and Riverdale Drive, in an area that was mostly farms. Corporate offices moved to the Jamestown site in 1988. A $10 million, three-story 228,000-square-foot retail store opened October 1, 1990, an event earning coverage from USA Today; the original, 78,000-square foot High Point store became a clearance center.

During the 1990s, annual sales increased exponentially from $20 million to $129 million, and the store grew physically along with its growing income; by 1996, Furnitureland South billed itself as "The World's Largest Home Furnishings Showplace." A 342,000-square-foot expansion in 1994 to the corporate headquarters and distribution center provided more space for showrooms. A $22 million, 500,000-square-foot addition completed in 1998 gave the store over twice the space it had before. Around the end of the decade, approximately 80 percent of customers were from outside the state. A Raleigh, North Carolina location was planned, but scrapped.

The profile of Furnitureland South reached a symbolic zenith in 1999 when an 85-foot-tall highboy situated at the showroom entrance became the largest item of furniture in the High Point area.

Expansion continued into the new millennium. A $15 million, 250,000-square-foot distribution center opened in 2001, replacing five warehouses. Good Morning America did a story on Furnitureland South on April 29, 2002. In 2008, a $15 million addition gave the distribution center 225,000 additional square feet, for a total of 475,000 square feet that also included corporate offices. The company expanded its web site to allow online shopping in 2012, debuting with 2000 products. In 2013 the company opened a 17,000-square-foot, high-tech design center for customers. Subway opened its largest restaurant, with 6,668 square feet, in Furnitureland South on November 11, 2015, joining Starbucks as a second option for on-campus dining. In April 2016, the company donated $1 million to High Point University, which subsequently named a wing of its Flanagan Center for Student Success the Harris Sales Education Center.

In October 2010, Darrell and Stella Harris were inducted into the American Furniture Hall of Fame by members of the American Furniture Hall of Fame Foundation, Inc. based on their professional achievements, personal standards and civic involvement.

Darrell Harris died in August 2014; in March 2015, Stella also died, leaving the leadership of the company to sons Jeff, who assumed the positions of president and CEO, and Jason Co-Owner, who also founded a streaming TV network, The Design Network.

In September 2015, Furnitureland South was recognized as one of the “Triad’s Best Places to Work” by the Triad Business Journal.

== Criticism ==
In 1996, Thomasville Furniture stopped selling its products at Furnitureland South because the store apparently violated Thomasville's policy of not quoting prices over the phone.

In 1999, when asking for rezoning for expansion, Furnitureland South agreed to switch from wells to municipal water. People in the area had wells go dry and had blamed Furnitureland South, which used several wells.

After 45 years of selling furniture, Scott Knox filed a complaint with the North Carolina Attorney General regarding the practice of exclusive deals for manufacturers to only sell their product in one area store. Knox was no longer able to sell products from some companies which had deals with Furnitureland South, and he could not afford a lawsuit. The attorney general's office said this practice was not normally a problem.

== Furniture Row ==
In the mid-1990s, Boyles Furniture bought 65 acres near Furnitureland South. Boyles chief operating officer Rick Grant said, "We knew when we bought the land that our vision was to make this a furniture destination." Boyles only needed eight acres for its store, which it moved from downtown, which the company believed was not doing well. The new location allowed Boyles to expand more than they could have at the former site. Ziba Fine Oriental Rugs started with space in the Boyles store on built a separate location in 2001.

Also in the mid-1990s, Abu Khan saw significant potential because of the size of Furnitureland South, and he bought a building for his Abu Oriental Rug and Home, which he later expanded.

In 2003, Charlotte, North Carolina developer Jay Chambers announced plans to develop the site into "Furniture Row", in an area he called "Gateway to the Furniture Capital of the World." During the next several years, Drexel Heritage, Thomasville Furniture and Klaussner Furniture built stores on Furniture Avenue, and Furniture Galleries, with six tenants, was announced by Greensboro, North Carolina developer R.W. Hamlett, Jr. Chambers wanted hotels and restaurants to locate in the area to make it convenient for people traveling long distances to buy furniture. Most of the area, but not Furnitureland South itself, was in the High Point city limits, though an agreement between High Point, Jamestown and Greensboro gave High Point the right to later annex the area.

As of 2005, according to the Convention and Visitors Bureau, 200,000 people came to High Point each year to buy furniture, from locations as far away as Chicago. The High Point Market has many locations in downtown High Point, but they are not open to consumers. People coming to High Point to shop for furniture have a difficult time finding a store downtown where they can shop, so a central location for retailers would provide a benefit to tourists.
