= J. Washington Moore =

American politician

- Born: March 16, 1866; Memphis, Tennessee, U.S.
- Died: January 2, 1965 (aged 98); Nashville, Tennessee, U.S.
- Education: Vanderbilt University
- Occupations: Lawyer, politician
- Political party: Democratic
- Spouse: Mary Robina Armistead
- Children: 4
- Relatives: Edgar E. Rand (son-in-law)

J. Washington Moore (March 16, 1866 – January 2, 1965) was an American fraternity president, lawyer and politician. He served as the Eminent Supreme Archon (President) of Sigma Alpha Epsilon from 1891 to 1894. He was a member of the Tennessee House of Representatives in 1903. He served as the City Attorney for Nashville, Tennessee in the 1930s. He served as United States Commissioner from 1942 to 1963.

== Early life ==
Moore was born on March 16, 1866, in Collierville, Tennessee near Memphis.

Moore graduated from Vanderbilt University, where he received a bachelor of arts degree in 1890 and a bachelor of laws degree 1891. At Vanderbilt, he joined the Sigma Alpha Epsilon (SAE) fraternity and the Dialectic Society. In an 1888 contest, he argument against the right to vote for women, suggesting they did not want to vote. He served as the Eminent Supreme Archon of SAE from 1891 to 1894.

== Career ==
Moore started his career as an attorney in Nashville in the late 1890s.

Moore joined the Democratic Party. He served as a member of the Tennessee House of Representatives in 1903. He nominated Austin Peay to become Speaker of the House. Moore was a proponent of labor unions, arguing, "What is called the labor movement is only a part of the larger movement toward human freedom."

Moore was appointed as Assistant Attorney General of the Tenth Judicial Circuit of Tennessee in 1910. He served as the Nashville City Attorney in the 1930s. When a black physician was elected to the city council and a ballot box was stolen, Moore suggested he was "unfamiliar with the law and procedure regarding such a theft," even though this had happened before. Meanwhile, Moore was elected as a member of the Nashville Bar Association in 1942. He served as United States Commissioner from 1942 to 1963. In this capacity, he arrested William L. Brown, a marijuana dealer with connections in Columbus, Ohio and Chicago who sold the drug to black musicians; Moore called him "the king of Nashville reefer dealers."

Moore was a member of the Tribe of Ben-Hur, the Modern Woodmen of America, the Royal Arcanum and the Dramatic Order of the Knights of Khorassan of the Knights of Pythias.

== Personal life ==
Moore married Mary Robina Armistead in 1892. They resided on South Avenue in East Nashville. They had two sons (J. Washington Moore, Jr. and William Armistead Moore) and two daughters (Mary and Sarah). One of their daughters, Sarah Frances, who married Edgar E. Rand, the President of the International Shoe Company; the couple divorced in 1951.

Moore smoked a cigar a day. He attended the West End United Methodist Church in Nashville.

== Death ==
Moore died on January 2, 1965, in Nashville, at the age of ninety-seven. By the time of his death, he was "the oldest member" of SAE.
