= Judith Resnik (professor) =

American legal academic

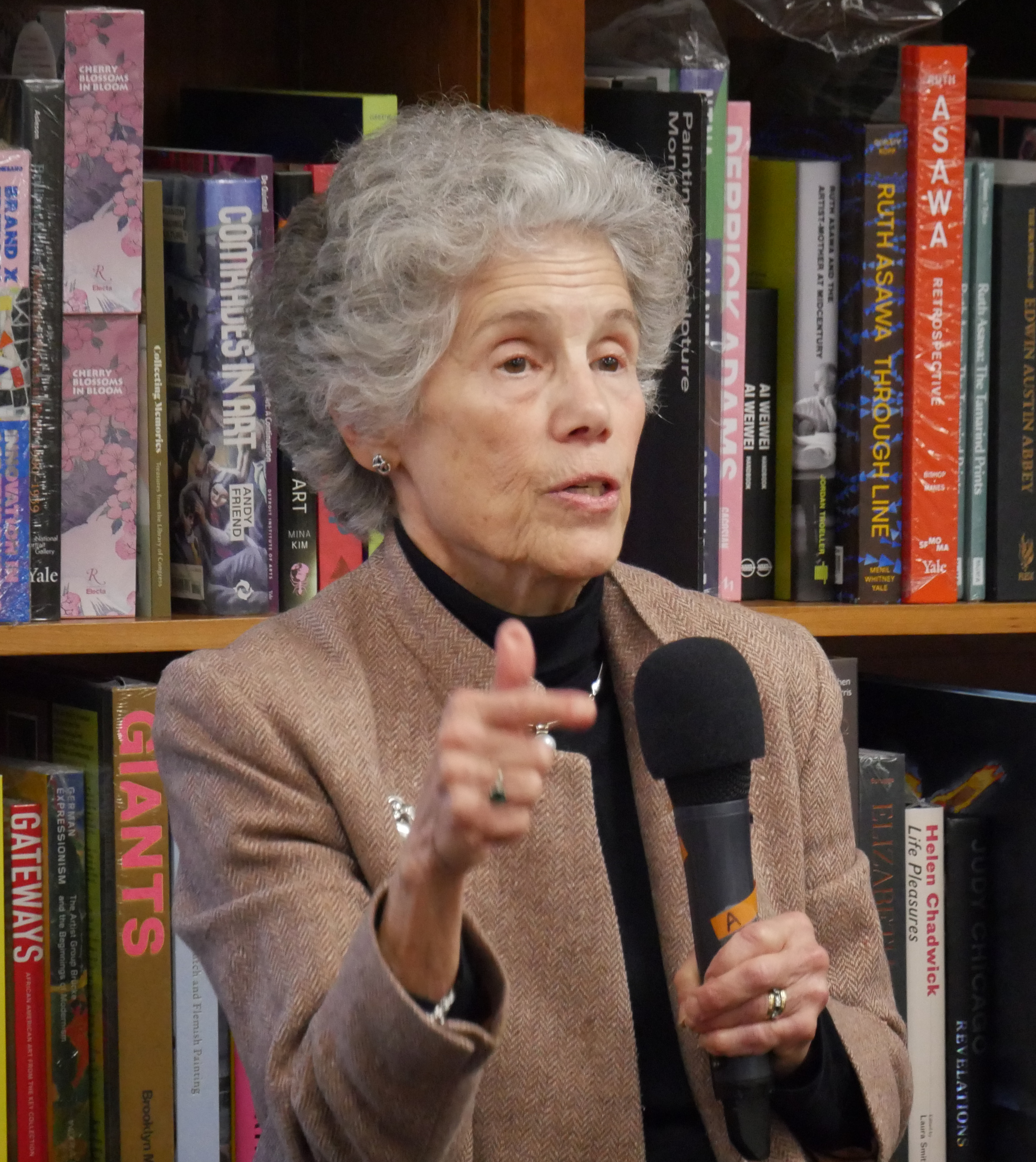
- Resnik in 2025
- Born: 1950 (age 75–76); Orange, New Jersey, U.S.
- Known for: "Managerial Judges" article Arthur Liman Center; Prison reform research
- Awards: Fellow, American Academy of Arts and Sciences (2001); Member, American Philosophical Society (2002)

Academic background
- Education: Bryn Mawr College (BA); New York University School of Law (JD)
- Website: law.yale.edu/judith-resnik

Judith Resnik is an American legal scholar and the Arthur Liman Professor of Law at Yale Law School, where she is also the founding director of the Arthur Liman Center for Public Interest Law. She is known for her scholarship on civil procedure, federal courts, federalism, gender and law, and the criminal justice system, particularly prisons and punishment.

== Education and early career ==
Resnik received her B.A. from Bryn Mawr College in 1972 and her J.D. from the New York University School of Law in 1975, where she was a Hays Civil Liberties Fellow.

Resnik began her teaching career in 1976 as a clinical lecturer at Yale Law School, where she taught classes on post-conviction remedies and worked with law students representing inmates at the federal prison in Danbury, Connecticut. In 1980, she joined the faculty of the University of Southern California Law School, where she served until 1997, achieving early tenure and promotion to full professor.

== Academic career ==
=== Yale Law School ===
In 1997, Resnik joined Yale Law School as the first Arthur Liman Professor of Law, a position she continues to hold. She teaches courses on federalism, procedure, courts, prisons, equality, and citizenship.

=== Scholarship ===
==== Managerial Judges ====
Resnik's most influential early work is her 1982 Harvard Law Review article "Managerial Judges," which analyzed the transformation of the judicial role from passive arbiter to active case manager. The article documented how judges increasingly engaged in pretrial conferences, settlement negotiations, and informal dispute resolution, raising concerns about judicial impartiality, due process, and the erosion of public adjudication.

The article has been widely cited in legal scholarship and judicial opinions. In November 2022, Yale Law School hosted a conference to mark the 40th anniversary of its publication, featuring panels on contemporary challenges in civil procedure and concluding with a conversation between Resnik and Supreme Court Associate Justice Sonia Sotomayor. A symposium reflecting on the article's legacy was published in the Review of Litigation in 2024.

==== Prison reform and punishment ====
Resnik has conducted extensive research on prisons, punishment, and the criminal justice system. Her book Impermissible Punishments: How Prison Became a Problem for Democracy, published by the University of Chicago Press in fall 2025, examines the history of punishment inside prisons and asks whether prisons can escape their historical connections to plantations and concentration camps.

The book traces constitutional challenges to prison conditions, including a 1960s case in Arkansas where prisoners challenged the practice of whipping. It documents the development of international standards for prisoner treatment, beginning with rules adopted by the League of Nations in 1934, and explores the impact of World War II, the United Nations, and the Civil Rights Movement on prison reform efforts.

Resnik has testified before the United States Senate on solitary confinement and submitted expert declarations to federal courts regarding prison conditions during the COVID-19 pandemic. She co-authored reports on solitary confinement policies in U.S. prisons for the Arthur Liman Center and contributed to the United States Commission on Civil Rights report Women in Prison: Seeking Justice Behind Bars (2020).

=== Arthur Liman Center for Public Interest Law ===
In 1997, Resnik founded the Arthur Liman Center for Public Interest Law at Yale Law School, named after attorney Arthur Liman.

=== Global Constitutional Law Seminar ===
From 2012 to 2022, Resnik chaired Yale Law School's Global Constitutional Law Seminar, part of the Gruber Program on Global Justice and Women's Rights. This annual private seminar brought together jurists from around the world to discuss challenges in constitutional adjudication. She edited volumes of readings for the seminar, including Weighing Judicial Authority (2022) and Urgency and Legitimacy (2021), which were made available as free e-books.

=== Litigation ===
Resnik has occasionally served as a litigator. She argued Mohawk Industries, Inc. v. Carpenter, decided by the Supreme Court of the United States in 2009, which addressed the collateral order doctrine in the context of attorney-client privilege. She also argued a 1987 case concerning the admission of women to the Rotary Club.

== Honors and awards ==
- Fellow, American Academy of Arts and Sciences (2001)
- Member, American Philosophical Society (2002), where she delivered the Henry LaBarre Jayne Lecture in 2005
- Outstanding Scholar of the Year Award, Fellows of the American Bar Foundation (2008)
- Elizabeth Hurlock Beckman Prize for outstanding faculty in higher education in psychology or law (2010)
- Arabella Babb Mansfield Award, highest honor from the National Association of Women Lawyers (2013)
- Resnik-Curtis Fellowship in Public Interest Law established in her honor (2017)
- Andrew Carnegie Fellowship (2018–2020), including a $200,000 grant for research on her book Impermissible Punishments
- Honorary Doctorate of Laws, University College London (2018)
- Margaret Brent Women Lawyers of Achievement Award, American Bar Association Commission on Women (1998)

== Selected publications ==
=== Books ===
- Impermissible Punishments: How Prison Became a Problem for Democracy, University of Chicago Press (2025)
- Representing Justice: Invention, Controversy, and Rights in City-States and Democratic Courtrooms (with Dennis E. Curtis), Yale University Press (2011)
- Federal Courts Stories (co-edited with Vicki C. Jackson), Foundation Press (2010)
- Migrations and Mobilities: Citizenship, Borders, and Gender (co-edited with Seyla Benhabib), NYU Press (2009)

=== Selected articles ===
- "The Capital Of And The Investments In Courts, State And Federal," New York University Law Review (2024)
- "Lawyerless Litigants, Filing Fees, Transaction Costs, and the Federal Courts" (co-authored), Northwestern Law Review (2024)
- "Seeing 'the Courts:' Managerial Judges, Empty Courtrooms, Chaotic Courthouses, and Judicial Legitimacy from the 1980s to the 2020s," Review of Litigation (2024)
- "Managerial Judges," Harvard Law Review 96 (1982): 374–448
