= Webb School of Knoxville =

Prep school in Knoxville, Tennessee, US

Coordinates: 35.922531493090304°N 84.11559200977254°W

- 9800 Webb School Drive. Knoxville, TN 37923; Knoxville, Tennessee; United States

Information
- Type: College preparatory day school
- Motto: Principes non homines ("Leaders, not men")
- Established: 1955
- CEEB code: 431127
- President: Ansel Sanders
- Faculty: 104 teachers
- Enrollment: 1,039 students
- Average class size: Upper School: 16 students Middle School: 16 students Lower School: 22 students
- Student to teacher ratio: About 10:1
- Campus: 110 acres (0.45 km^{2})
- Colors: Green and White
- Athletics conference: TSSAA
- Mascot: Spartan
- Tuition: $17,900 (Junior Spartan Pre-K) $24,270 (K-5) $27,100 (6-12)
- Website: www.webbschool.org

Webb School of Knoxville is a private coeducational day school in Knoxville, Tennessee, enrolling students from pre-kindergarten to twelfth grade. It was founded in 1955 by Robert Webb (1919–2005), grandson of Webb School of Bell Buckle founder Sawney Webb.

== History ==
=== Sequoyah Hills Presbyterian ===
In 1955, Robert Webb, then 36, made his way from the Webb School in Claremont, California to Knoxville, Tennessee, with plans to found the third school in his family. Webb's grandfather, Sawney Webb, had established the Webb School of Bell Buckle in middle Tennessee, and his uncle Thompson Webb had started the Webb School in Claremont. During the first school year, 4 students attended the new Webb School, but by the end of the year, the total had risen to 11. The first two school years were held in the basement of Sequoyah Hills Presbyterian Church. The new school adopted the Latin motto of the Webb School in Claremont, "principes non homines."

=== Staub School ===
After the second school year, Webb had found a new location for the school at the old Staub School, a brick building where the University of Tennessee's aquatic center now stands. The location was formerly a medical school. At this time, Webb's first sports teams were still without their own practice places. During its time at the Staub School, Webb admitted its first female students, establishing the affiliate Webb Girls School, which operated from a church building.

=== West Knoxville ===
In 1959, Webb relocated to the current campus location near I-140. At the time, the Sequoyah Hills location was considered "West Knoxville," and the new campus was beyond the outskirts of the city.

=== Coeducation ===
In the 1968 school year, Webb became coeducational and was reorganized into the lower school and the upper school.

=== Middle school ===
In 1974, the school added a fifth and sixth grade to meet the rising demand. With this addition, the school was now separated into the middle school, which consisted of grades 6-8, and the upper school, with grades 9-12. The current middle school principal is Jennifer Phillips, the current middle school Dean of Students is David Haines, the current upper school principal is Matt MacDonald, and the current upper school Deans of Student Life are Stephanie Spurlock, Jerome Romain, and James Michel.

=== Lower school ===
In 1998, the new lower school opened at Webb. The new building currently houses the Kindergarten and first through fifth grade students. The Webb School of Knoxville now consists of a lower school (K-5), the middle school (6-8), and the upper school (9-12).

=== Prekindergarten ===
In fall 2016, the new pre-kindergarten program began at Webb. The Junior Spartan Pre-K program is for four- to five-year-olds. Two teachers lead the program, which is also supported by certified teachers in arts, Spanish, and technology.

=== Construction ===
In early 2007, Webb's Honor the Tradition, Realize the Vision campaign to renovate and expand the campus began. Phase I included building the new Jim and Kay Clayton Science Center, which was finished in October 2007. The Coleman-Lange International Center for the Study of World Languages and Cultures, a building dedicated to the learning of international cultures, was completed in 2008 as well as the Founder's Commons.

Beginning in late 2019, new construction projects began on campus. In the Middle School, construction began on the new Innovation Center, set to finish construction in Fall of 2020. Also starting in fall of 2019 in the Upper School Learning Commons, meant to serve the same purpose as the Innovation Center, but with added features such as a cafe and possibly virtual reality. The final project beginning that fall is the new Central Building, meant to be a newer entrance to Webb's campus.

== Athletics ==
Webb fields teams in several sports, competing in Division II (private schools) of the Tennessee Secondary School Athletic Association. Webb has athletic facilities, including football stadium, softball, baseball, soccer, lacrosse/field hockey fields, wrestling room, basketball and volleyball courts, outdoor swimming pool, outdoor track, outdoor and indoor tennis courts, and several more practice facilities.

The football team were runners-up in 1997 and 2005 and state champions in 1981, 1996, 2006, 2009, 2010, and 2012. The baseball team were state champions in 1985 & 2010. The boys' cross country team was the state champion in 1990 and 2009. This achievement carried Webb to the 1990 Pepsi Cup State Championship. More recently the boys cross country team won back to back state championships in 2002, 2003, 2009, 2010, and in 2012. The girls cross country team also took a state title in 2007, 2009, 2010, and 2012. The boys lacrosse team was the 2009 East Tennessee Division II regional champions and acquired the number one LaxPower.com ranking in Division II in the state of Tennessee. The girls basketball team won a state championship in 2007 and 2009.

Sports include: baseball, basketball, bowling, cheerleading, climbing, cross country, diving, field hockey, football, golf, lacrosse, sailing, soccer, softball, swimming, tennis, track and field, volleyball, and wrestling.

=== High school football ===
The Spartans hold an intense rivalry with Knoxville Catholic High School that dates back to the 1970s.

The Spartans' first state football title (TSSAA Class A) was in the fall of 1981, when the team fielded fewer than 20 players in any one game, and most starters played offense and defense. They went 7-3 in the regular season (losing to only one Class A team) and then beat Sweetwater, Coalfield, and Meigs County in the playoffs. Webb won the championship game on December 4, 1981. It was played at Bearden High School in Knoxville, and Webb defeated Memphis Preparatory School.

Webb defeated Goodpasture, 27-20, in the TSSAA Class AA state championship.

The Spartans currently play in TSSAA Division II-AA. In 2005, the Webb Spartans were finalists in TSSAA Division II-AA, losing 0-26 to the Evangelical Christian School. The next year, Webb returned to the state championship and again played ECS, winning 17-14. The win was the Spartans' third state title in football, which tied them for 11th in Tennessee for the number of football state championships. Webb's final record for the 2007 season was 9-3. The next season, the Spartans were moved to Division II-AA and made the playoffs, but lost in the first round to Montgomery Bell Academy.

In 2009, Webb moved back down to Division II-Small. The Spartans went 12-1 en route to their fourth state championship. In 2010, Webb repeated as state champions by beating St. Georges, 42-7 and finishing 13-0 on the season. Webb brought home its sixth state championship in 2012 when the Spartans defeated ECS, 47-14.

== Notable alumni ==
- Ned G. Andrews - winner of the 1994 Scripps National Spelling Bee
- Aftyn Behn - American politician
- Bill Haslam - 49th governor of Tennessee; 67th mayor of Knoxville
- Dee Haslam - CEO and founder of RIVR Media
- Jimmy Haslam - CEO of Pilot Flying J and majority owner of the Cleveland Browns
- Trey Hollingsworth - US Representative from Indiana's 9th Congressional District
- Glory Johnson - former Dallas Wings WNBA player
- Elizabeth Kostova - author of The Historian
- Monica Langley - senior investigative journalist for the Wall Street Journal and author
- Sharon G. Lee - judge on Tennessee Court of Appeals and Tennessee Supreme Court
- Greg McMichael - former Atlanta Braves pitcher
- Chad Pennington - former NFL quarterback, presently sports analyst on the NFL Network
- Wes Roach - former PGA Tour player
- Herbert Slatery - Attorney General of Tennessee
- Mike Stewart - member of the Tennessee House of Representatives
- Tyler Summitt - former college basketball player and coach
- Davis Tarwater - 2012 Olympics swimming Gold Medalist
