= Lorberbaum =

Lorberbaum is a surname. Notable people with the surname include:

- Jeffrey Lorberbaum (born 1954), American billionaire businessman
- Menachem Lorberbaum (born 1958), Israeli academic
- Yaakov Lorberbaum (1760–1832), Polish rabbi and posek
