= Scozzafava =

Scozzafava is a surname, and may refer to:

Nickname or occupational name for someone who removed beans from their pods, from Italian scozzare ‘to shell’ and fava ‘bean’.

- Dede Scozzafava, American politician
- Ralph Scozzafava, American business executive
