= Ernest Trova =

American painter and sculptor (1927 - 2009)

Ernest T. Trova
- Born: February 19, 1927; Clayton, Missouri, US
- Died: March 8, 2009 (aged 82)
- Occupations: sculptor, painter
- Relatives: Henry Hale Rand (father-in-law)

Ernest Tino Trova (February 19, 1927 – March 8, 2009) was a self-trained American surrealist and pop art painter and sculptor. Best known for his signature image and figure series, The Falling Man, Trova considered his entire output a single "work in progress." Trova used classic American comic character toys in some of his pieces because he admired their surrealism. Many of Trova's sculptures are cast in unusual white bronze. He began as a painter, progressing through three-dimensional constructions to his mature medium, sculpture. Trova's gift of forty of his works led to the opening of St. Louis County, Missouri's Laumeier Sculpture Park.

== Biography ==
Trova was born on February 19, 1927, in Clayton, Missouri, where he attended Clayton High School and St. Louis University High School. His father, an industrial tool designer and inventor, died shortly after Trova graduated from high school.

His interest in poetry led him to begin a correspondence with Ezra Pound, who had been confined to St. Elizabeths Hospital in Washington, D.C., after World War II.

Trova lived in the St. Louis area his entire life and has a star on the St. Louis Walk of Fame.

=== Artist ===
He worked at the Famous-Barr department store as a decorator and window dresser. A self-taught artist, Morton D. May, an art collector who later served as chairman of The May Department Stores Company (which owned the store he worked at), bought one of his paintings and contributed it to the Museum of Modern Art.

As a 20-year-old, his painting Roman Boy, the first work he exhibited in his career, was awarded first prize in the Missouri Exhibition conducted at what was then known as the City Art Museum (now the St. Louis Art Museum). Roman Boy described as a provocative "sexually graphic work", alternatively "scandalized or energized" critics and the public, and earned the work a picture in Life magazine, earning him a degree of recognition that was unusual for an artist from St. Louis.

He started showing his art during the early years of the Pace Gallery, which later became "one of the most powerful art galleries in the world". Some of his first art was acquired by the collections of the Guggenheim Museum and the Museum of Modern Art in New York City, as well as by the St. Louis Art Museum in his hometown and by Tate in London.

=== The Falling Man ===
The Falling Man, 1969, at Laumeier Sculpture Park

Created in 1964, The Falling Man, is Trova's best known work. His "Falling Man" series of works, "about man at his most imperfect", featured an armless human figure, that appeared in sculptures, paintings and prints. In an interview that year with the St. Louis Post-Dispatch, he described the piece as "a personal hypothetical theory on the nature of man". Trova further stated that "I believe that man is first of all an imperfect creature. The first reaction I usually get to this is that I'm pessimistic. I don't think I am.... It's very close to many theories of man — the Catholic view that man is a fallen creature, for example."

Trova created multiple versions of The Falling Man, including variant sculptures and wristwatches with images of the piece. This led to charges of commercialism and critiques that the piece was period kitsch. An associate of Trova's rejected the criticism, noting that the duplicate works was an example of seriality, in which "Trova invented this great symbol of human fallibility through processing and reprocessing the image. Trova's work is misunderstood. Seriality is as essential to his work as it was to Warhol's. One of his earliest statements about 'Falling Man' was that all of it — all the sculptures, all the paintings, all the prints — were one work in his own mind."

=== Later work ===
A major exhibit of Trova's works was presented in 1969 at the Pace Gallery, with reviewer Hilton Kramer of The New York Times calling it one whose size and scope "befits an artist currently enjoying a huge success". Kramer noted the recurrence of a theme in Trova's work, as exemplified by his Falling Man variations, stating that "All artists have a tendency to fall in love with their own symbols, and this is certainly the case with Mr. Trova". The exhibit included a "faceless, armless, polished, unsexed" symbolic figure that was presented in varying poses, and in a range of materials including chrome-plated bronze, enameled aluminum, marble and nickel.

Now covering 105 acres (42 ha), what is now known as Laumeier Sculpture Park opened to the public in 1975. Trova agreed to donate 40 of his large sculptures to help establish the park's collection of outdoor sculptures. Trova's dealer at the Pace Gallery approved of the arrangement, which were contributed upon a formal agreement signed on December 11, 1975.

Despite his early successes, Trova's later constructivist abstract sculptures attracted little critical attention outside of St. Louis.

=== Family and death ===
A resident of Richmond Heights, Missouri, Trova died at age 82 on March 8, 2009, due to congestive heart failure. He had been married to Carla C. "Teddy" Rand, who came from the family that owned the International Shoe Company. As described by an art dealer who sold his works, Trova "never recovered from her death" in June 2008, "After she died, he just didn't last". He was survived by their three children.
