= Interco =

Interco may refer to:

- International Code of Signals
- Interco (furniture company) later Furniture Brands International, an American home furnishings company based in Clayton, Missouri
- Interco (horse), an American Thoroughbred racehorse, winner of the 1984 San Fernando Stakes
- Interco Tire Corporation: Louisiana based tire company.
