= Frank C. Rand =

American businessman and philanthropist

Frank Chambless Rand
- Born: February 25, 1876; Red Banks, Mississippi, U.S.
- Died: December 2, 1949 (aged 73); St. Louis, Missouri, U.S.
- Education: Webb School
- Alma mater: Vanderbilt University
- Occupation: Businessman
- Spouse: Nettie Lumpkin Hale
- Children: 6, including Henry Hale Rand, Edgar E. Rand
- Parent(s): Henry Oscar Rand; Ada Elizabeth Norfleet
- Relatives: Philip Henry Hale (father-in-law); William R. Orthwein Jr. (son-in-law); Adele L. Rand (daughter-in-law)

Frank C. Rand (February 25, 1876 – December 2, 1949) was an American businessman and philanthropist. He served as the President of the International Shoe Company, the world's largest shoe manufacturer, from 1916 to 1930, and as its chairman from 1930 to 1949.

== Early life and family background ==
Frank C. Rand was born on February 25, 1876, in Red Banks, Mississippi. His father was Henry Oscar Rand and his mother, Ada Elizabeth Norfleet. One of his paternal great-grandfathers, John Rand (1786–1865), was a planter in Colbert County, Alabama, in the Antebellum South. Another paternal great-grandfather, Moses Carlock, was a large planter in Marshall County, Mississippi. His paternal grandfather, Jesse P. Norfleet, was a cabinetmaker from Suffolk, Virginia, who lived at the historic Dunvegan cottage in Holly Springs, Mississippi, until 1861.

Rand had two brothers, Jesse H. and Edgar Eugene, and two sisters, Eva Cornelia and Helen Octavia. He grew up on a cotton plantation in Red Banks. At the age of nine, he moved to Holly Springs, Mississippi, where his father was the co-founder of Rand, Johnson & Company.

Rand was educated in public schools in Holly Springs. He attended the Webb School, a preparatory boarding school in Bell Buckle, Tennessee, from 1890 to 1894. Its founder and namesake, William R. Webb, was one of his teachers. Rand enrolled at Vanderbilt University in Nashville, Tennessee, in 1894, graduating with a Bachelor of Arts degree in 1898. At Vanderbilt University, he was a member of the Delta Kappa Epsilon fraternity.

== Business career ==
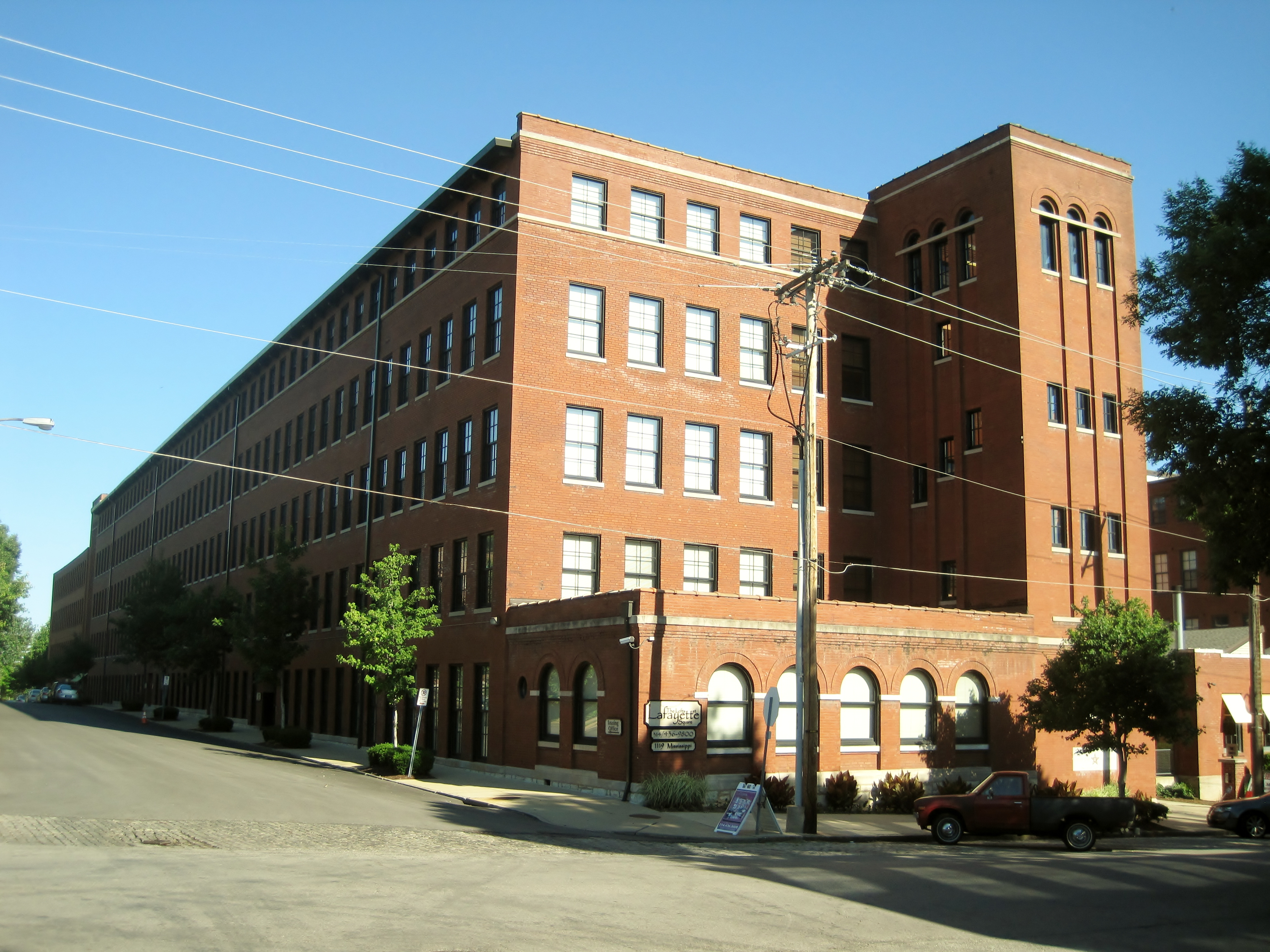
Roberts, Johnson and Rand-International Shoe Company Complex in St. Louis, Missouri.

Rand began his career as a stock clerk for the Roberts, Johnson, and Rand Shoe Company in 1898. He became its vice-president in 1907. When the company became known as the International Shoe Company in 1911, he remained as vice-president. He then served as its president from 1916 to 1930, and as its chairman from 1930 to 1949. In 1928, as president, Rand reported strong, steady growth. The company, which became the world's largest manufacturer of shoes, eventually changed its name to Furniture Brands International.

Rand served on the boards of directors of the St. Louis–San Francisco Railway, the Cleveland, Cincinnati, Chicago and St. Louis Railway, the Southwestern Bell Telephone Company, the Mercantile-Commerce National Bank, the Union-Electric Company of Missouri, and the Mississippi Valley Barge Line Company. From 1942 to 1945, in the midst of World War II, he was the President of the Greater St. Louis War Chest.

== Philanthropy ==
Rand was elected to the board of trustees of the Webb School in 1894. He served as its chairman from 1921 to at least 1940. Additionally, he paid for the construction of a new building for a dormitory on its campus.

Rand served on the Board of Trust of his alma mater, Vanderbilt University, from 1912 to 1949, and as its president from 1935 to 1949. He donated US$150,000 to the university in 1925. As President, he was the one who accepted the resignation of Chancellor James Hampton Kirkland in 1937, and installed chancellors Oliver Carmichael in 1938 and Harvie Branscomb in 1946.

Rand also served on the Board of Trustees of Washington University in St. Louis from 1928 to 1940.

Rand served on the board of trustees of the Barnes-Jewish Hospital in St. Louis, Missouri from 1917 to 1949, and as its chairman from 1923 to 1949. He donated US$300,000 to the hospital in 1928. His donation was matched by Jackson Johnson. As a result, the Rand-Johnson Memorial Building was named after their honor.

Rand was honored by the American Hospital Association and inducted into the Methodist Church Hall of Fame for his philanthropy.

== Personal life ==
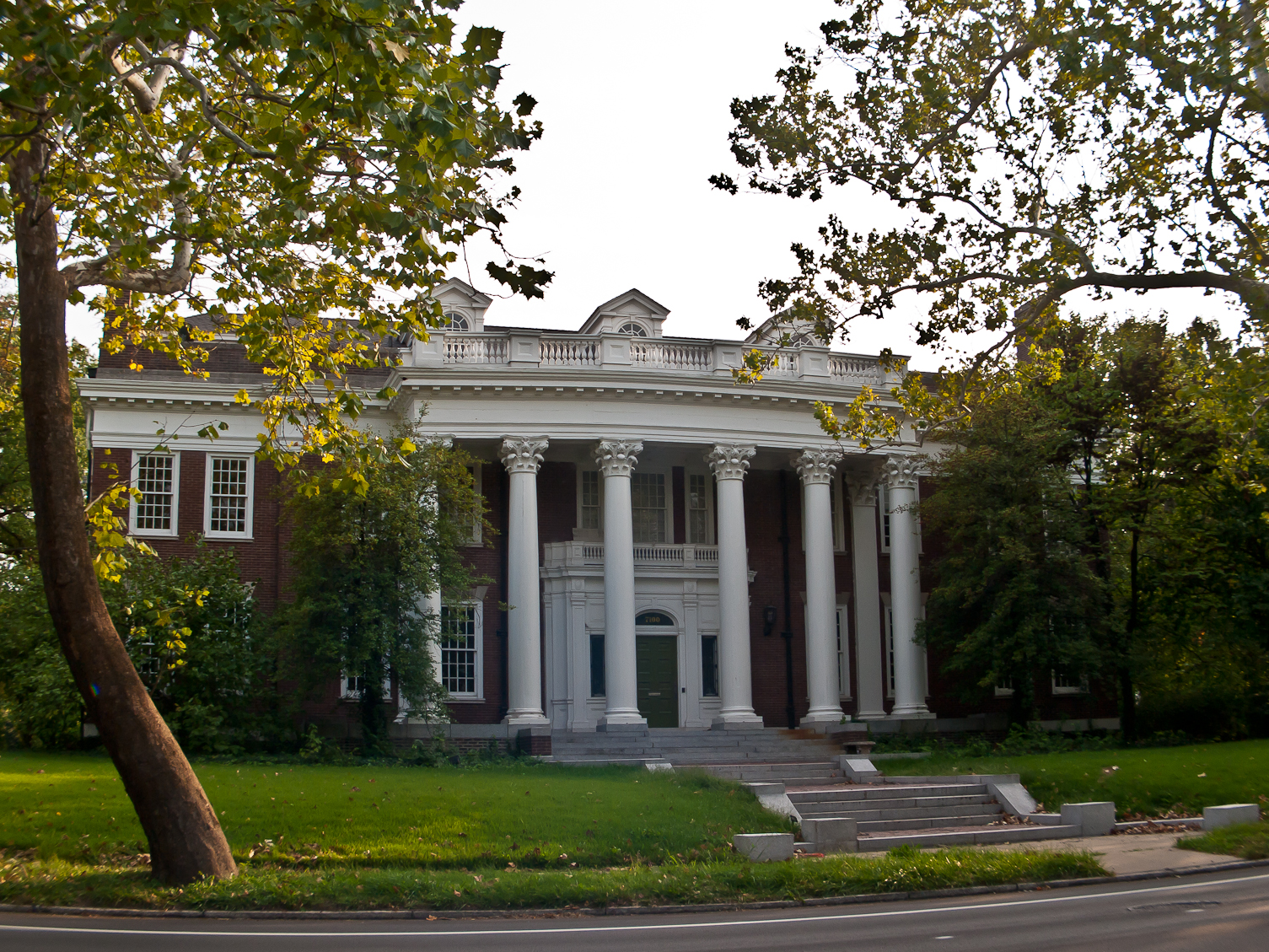
The Frank C. Rand residence, located at 7100 Delmar Boulevard, University City, Missouri.

Rand married Nettie Lumpkin Hale, the daughter of British-born publisher Philip Henry Hale and a Vanderbilt University alumna, on October 5, 1904, in St. Louis, Missouri. They resided in a mansion located at 7100 Delmar Boulevard in University City, Missouri. They had six children, including Henry Hale Rand (1909–1962), and Laura Hale Rand Orthwein, 1938 Queen at the Veiled Prophet Ball and married to William R. Orthwein Jr.

Rand was a Methodist. He was a member of the Racquet Club of St. Louis, the St. Louis Country Club, and the Noonday Club, a private member's club in St. Louis. He was an avid golfer.

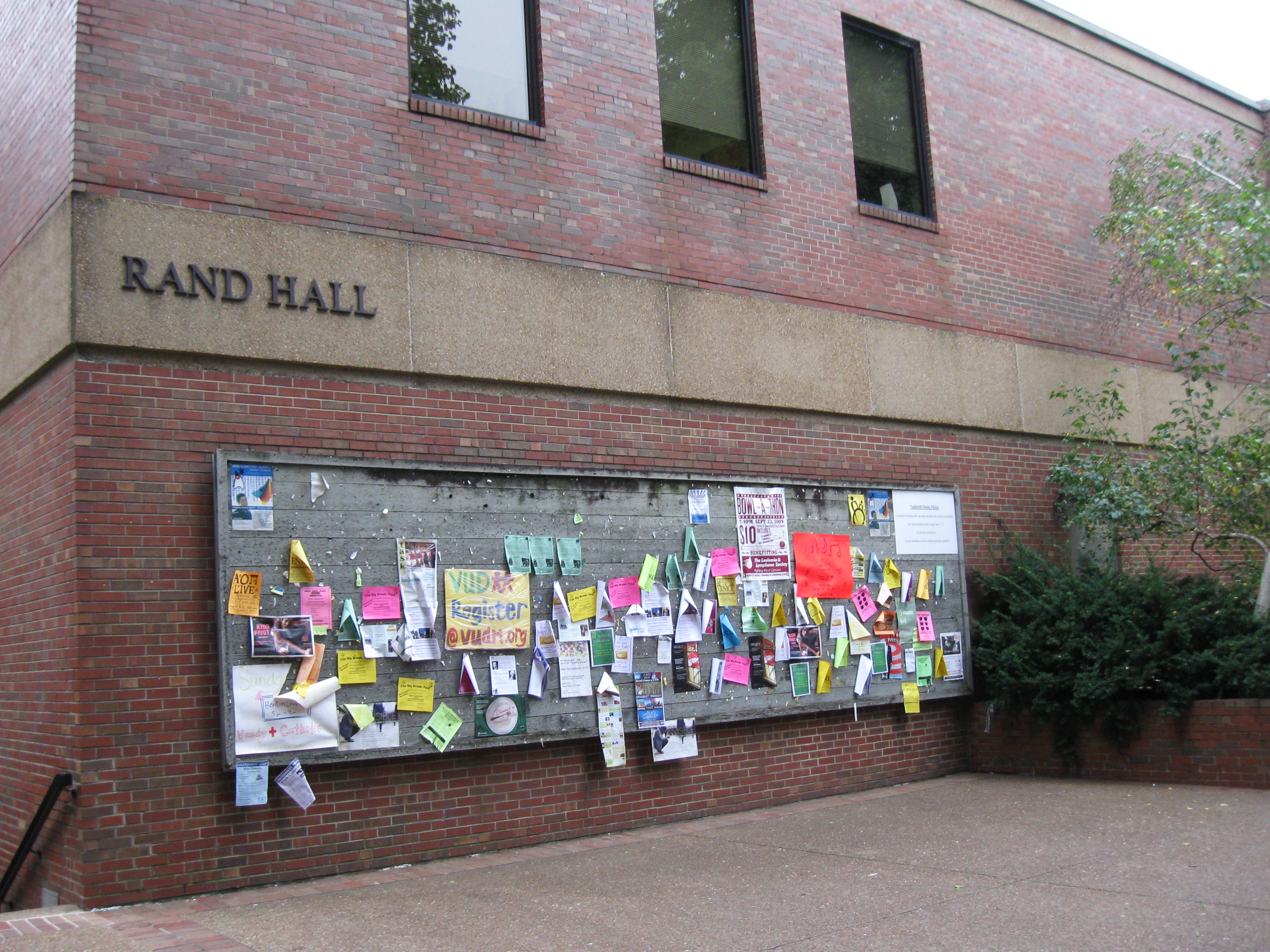
Rand Hall on the campus of Vanderbilt University.

His wife donated the Nettie Hale Rand Collection of Fine Binding and Printing to the Jean and Alexander Heard Library in 1941.

== Death and legacy ==
Rand died on December 2, 1949, at the Barnes Hospital in St. Louis, Missouri.

Rand's mansion in University City, Missouri has been listed on the National Register of Historic Places since September 11, 1980.

The dining hall on the campus of Vanderbilt University, Rand Hall, is named in his honor. Additionally, his portrait, done by painter Harold Ellison in 1950, is on display in Kirkland Hall, Vanderbilt University's administration building. His grandson, Frank C. Rand III, was a real estate developer and sports car collector.
