= Philip Henry Hale =

American journalist

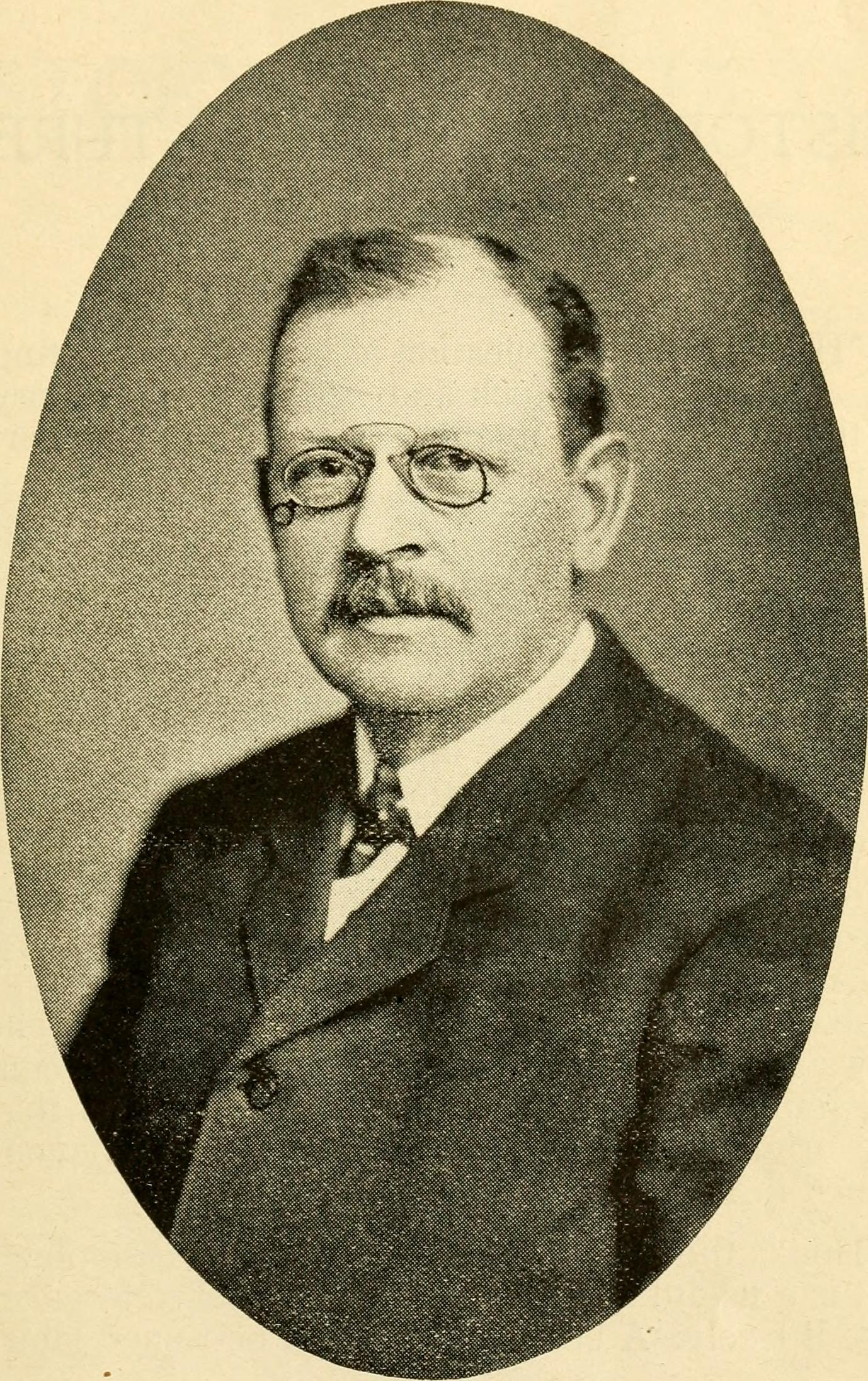
- Born: May 24, 1850; London, England
- Died: May 7, 1927 (aged 76); St. Louis, Missouri, USA
- Occupations: Publisher, composer
- Spouse: Miriam Strong
- Children: Philip Henry Hale, Jr. Nettie Hale Rand
- Parent(s): Henry Hale; Mary Ann Saunders
- Relatives: Frank C. Rand (son-in-law); Henry Hale Rand (grandson); Edgar E. Rand (grandson)

Philip Henry Hale (May 24, 1850 – May 7, 1927) was a British-born American newspaper publisher, rancher, and music composer.

== Early life ==
Philip Henry Hale was born on May 24, 1850, in London. His father, Henry Hale, was a solicitor's clerk. He grew up at 39 Gillingham Street in Pimlico, London. When he was four years old, in 1854, his family moved to "Bolingbroke Terrace, Clifton Fields, in South London." Later, they moved to Arthur Street (in the City of London), Old Kent Road, High Street in Peckham, and 190 Gray's Inn Road.

Hale was educated in public schools in London. At the age of thirteen, in 1863, he worked in a solicitor's practise at 62 Great Tower Street. He also played the cornet for the City of London Rifles.

== Career ==
Hale worked as a sailor. Shortly after, the embarked upon a career in publishing in London, specializing in business directories. By 1869, he emigrated to the United States, working for a British publisher in New York City and Boston.

Hale moved to Texas in 1871. He acquired a ranch and published the Texas Live Stock Journal out of Fort Worth. In the 1880s, he fought Native Americans in Texas.

Hale moved to St. Louis, Missouri in 1900. He became the founder and publisher of the National Livestock Reporter. Two decades later, in 1920, he became the founder and publisher of the National Fruit Growers' Magazine. He also wrote several books about farming.

Hale became a composer of World War I-themed songs, like Lucy, Love Your Sailor, For Country and Girl Song for a Soldier; Dance for the Ballroom; March for the Band (1918), Soldiers and Sailors: A Tribute to All Those Who Served in the Army and Navy During the Great War (1919), The Doughboy: A Musical Tribute to the Infantry Soldier (1920).

Hale also wrote "Why We Are At War", an article in the Minneapolis Journal in which he stressed the need to support Great Britain in the war effort and explained that America was at war with the House of Hohenzollern. He also wrote his autobiography entitled An Autobiography of a London Boy, followed by an autobiographical essay entitled Reflections at Reaching His Seventy-seventh Year.

== Personal life ==
Hale married Miriam Strong, a philanthropist active in the United Daughters of the Confederacy, on February 23, 1880, in Fort Worth, Texas. Their son, Philip Henry Hale, Jr., married Dora Pierce and later, Percy Wellman Newcomb. Their daughter, Nettie Hale, married Frank C. Rand, the president of the International Shoe Company.

Hale was Episcopalian while his wife was a Methodist. She converted to the Episcopal Church for him. They only baptized their children when they chose which denomination to join, at the age of twelve.

Hale became a naturalized American citizen.

== Death ==
Hale died on May 7, 1927, in St. Louis, Missouri.

== Bibliography ==
- The Beef-Packing Industry (St. Louis, Mo. : National farmer and Stock Grower, 1900?, 29 pages).
- The Date Book History of Live Stock and Agriculture (St. Louis, Missouri: The Hale Publishing Co., 1907., 95 pages).
- The Book of Live Stock Champions, Being an Artistic Souvenir Supplement of the Monthly National Farmer and Stock Grower. (St. Louis, Missouri, Philip Henry Hale, 1912, 352 pages).
- Hale's History of Agriculture by Dates. A Simple Record of Historical Events and Victories of Peaceful Industries. (St. Louis, Missouri: The Hale Publishing Co., 1915., 95 pages).
