= Heritage Home Group =

American furniture company

Heritage Home Group LLC
- Company type: Private
- Industry: Home Furnishings
- Headquarters: High Point, North Carolina
- Key people: Pierre de Villeméjane, President and CEO
- Products: Furniture; Home Accessories
- Revenue: ▼$1.743 billion (2008)

Heritage Home Group LLC, formed to purchase most assets of the defunct Furniture Brands International, was a High Point, North Carolina–based home furnishings company. It owned the brands Broyhill, Lane, Thomasville, and Drexel Heritage.

== History ==
On September 9, 2013, Furniture Brands International filed for Chapter 11 bankruptcy. The company planned to sell all businesses other than Lane Furniture to a group managed by Oaktree Capital Management LP. On October 2, a judge approved a $280 million stalking horse offer by KPS Capital Partners. On November 4, Samson Holding Ltd., the largest stockholder, announced its intention to bid but that bid never took place, and on November 22, a judge approved the KPS bid. KPS announced the name Heritage Home Group LLC for the new owner of "substantially all of the assets" of Furniture Brands on November 25. Also announced at that time was the resignation of Furniture Brands chairman and CEO Ralph Scozzafava. Ira Glazer became Heritage president and CEO.

On January 21, 2014, Heritage announced the closing of Thomasville Furniture's operations in Thomasville, North Carolina, as of March 21, with 84 jobs cut. A Saltillo, Mississippi, plant making Lane Furniture would close at the same time, meaning 480 jobs lost, though other plants in the Tupelo, Mississippi area would remain open, despite earlier plans to close all the plants.

In March 2014 Heritage said the Pearson Company plant in High Point, started by the Pearson family in 1942, was closing by August, affecting 86 employees.

Late in April 2014, Heritage announced it would close its Clayton headquarters June 25. The most likely location for the new headquarters was High Point, North Carolina. The company also said the Ballwin, Missouri, office would close by the end of 2014.

In June 2014 it was reported that the last Drexel Heritage plant, on Hogan Street in Morganton, North Carolina, was closing July 31, with 87 people losing their jobs. The company was started by the Huffman and Mull families, but in recent years, decisions to move manufacturing to other countries hurt the Morganton area.

A bankruptcy filing on December 12, 2014, showed United Furniture Industries won the bidding for the 475,000-square-foot Lane Furniture plant in Tupelo.

In April 2015, the company began $2.7 million in improvements on a 70,000-square-foot showroom built in the 1990s for Drexel-Heritage, and later used by Henredon, Maitland-Smith and La Barge, on Eastchester Drive in High Point. When finished, the headquarters was to be 100,000 square feet.

In May, Richard Lozyniak became interim CEO after Glazer left the company. Heritage headquarters was temporarily located in Thomasville until work was completed on the former showrooms.

On September 8, Heritage Home Group appointed Pierre de Villemejane as President and Chief Executive Officer after he served as CEO of WWRD Holdings Ltd. and Speedline Technologies Inc., also KPS companies.

United Furniture Industries Inc. signed an agreement to buy Lane Company by the end of 2017. Heritage sold Lane Ventures to Bassett Furniture Industries for $15.1 million in December 2017. Heritage announced the formation of the three business units. Harvey Dondale would be president of Broyhill, a position he held from 2005 to 2007. Thomasville & Co., with Regan Iglesia as president, would include Thomasville, Drexel and Henredon. Henry Bowman would lead the luxury brands division, with Hickory Chair, Pearson, Maitland-Smith and Lane Venture.

On July 29, 2018, HH Global II BV, which operated Heritage, filed for Chapter 11 bankruptcy. HH Global said RHF Investments Inc., owner of Century, Hancock & Moore and Highland House, would buy its luxury brands division. Heritage said it was planning to sell its Thomasville & Co. and Broyhill divisions to one buyer.

HH Global agreed to sell its luxury brands division, including Hickory Chair, Maitland-Smith, La Barge and Pearson, to RHF Investments Inc., owner of Century, Hancock & Moore and Highland House. The high bid for Thomasville & Co. was $38.5 million from HHG IPCo. LLC, a joint venture between SB360 Capital Partners and Authentic Brands Group of New York City, known for buying businesses in trouble but also for outsourcing. After court approval of the sale, trademark documents show Big Lots took over rights to Broyhill marks November 9, 2018.

In December 2018 a U.S. Bankruptcy Court Judge approved two sales of buildings. Medical Realty Advisors LLC bought the Heritage Home Group headquarters for $4 million, and Hamilton Square LLC bought a building and land in Lenoir, North Carolina for $175,000.

On March 5, 2019, the $4 million sale of the headquarters/showroom building to Eastchester Storage LLC was completed, and the building will be used for storage.
