= Henry Hale Rand =

American heir, business executive & philanthropist (1909-1962)

- Born: 1909; St. Louis, Missouri, U.S.
- Died: January 18, 1962 (aged 52–53); St. Louis, Missouri, U.S.
- Resting place: Bellefontaine Cemetery
- Education: Vanderbilt University
- Occupation: Businessman
- Spouse: Dorothy Bolin
- Children: 1 son, 1 daughter
- Parent(s): Frank C. Rand; Nettie Hale
- Relatives: Philip Henry Hale (maternal grandfather); Oscar Johnson (paternal uncle); Edgar E. Rand (brother); William R. Orthwein, Jr. (brother-in-law); Ernest Trova (son-in-law)

Henry Hale Rand (1909–1962) was an American heir, business executive and philanthropist. He served as the President of the International Shoe Company, the world's largest manufacturer of shoes, from 1955 to 1962.

== Early life ==
Henry Hale Rand was born in 1909 in St. Louis, Missouri. His father, Frank C. Rand, was a businessman who served as the President and later Chairman of the International Shoe Company. His mother was Nettie Hale, the daughter of British-born Texas rancher, publisher and composer Philip Henry Hale.

Rand graduated from Vanderbilt University in Nashville, Tennessee, where he received a bachelor's degree in Economics.

== Business career ==
Rand started his career at the International Shoe Company (which became Furniture Brands International) in 1929. He joined its board of directors in 1945. From 1948 to 1955, he served as its Vice President.

Upon the death of his brother, Edgar E. Rand, who had served as President from 1950 to 1955, Rand served as President until 1962. Under his leadership, the company was the world's largest shoe manufacturer.

== Philanthropy ==
Rand was elected as the President of the Webb School in 1950. Additionally, he served on the Board of Trustees of his alma mater, Vanderbilt University.

== Personal life ==
Rand married Dorothy Bolin. They resided in St. Louis, Missouri. They had a son, Frank C. Rand, III, and a daughter, married to Surrealist painter and sculptor Ernest Trova.

== Death and legacy ==
Rand died on January 18, 1962, in St. Louis, Missouri. He was fifty-three years old. His funeral took place at the University Methodist Church in University City, Missouri, and he was buried at Bellefontaine Cemetery in St. Louis. His will included a US$5,000 donation to Vanderbilt University.
