= The Big Chair =

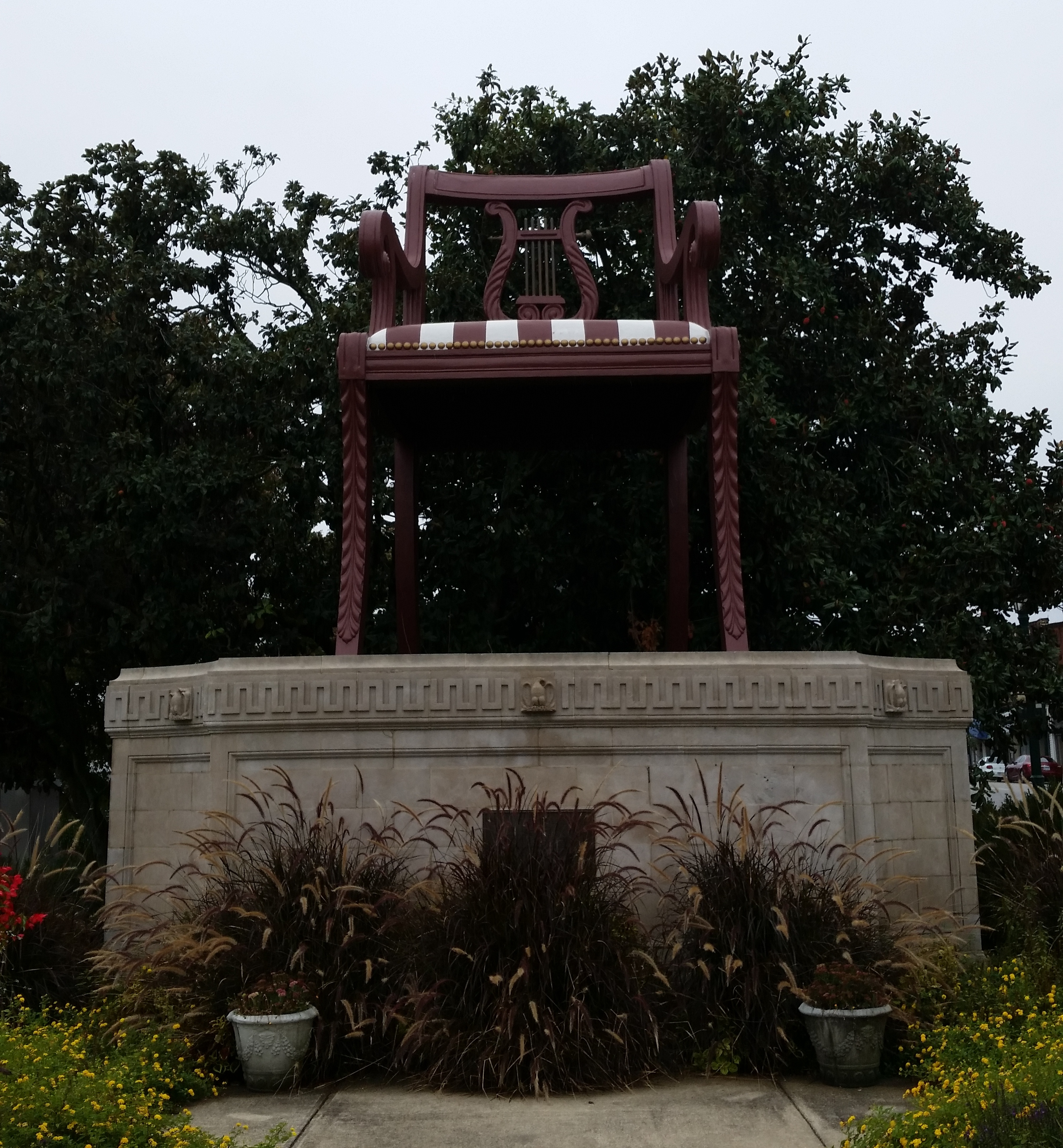
- The Big Chair
- Location: Thomasville, North Carolina
- Coordinates: 35.8823711°N 80.0823795°W
- Height: 30 feet (9.1 m)
- Built: 1950 (current chair)

The Big Chair is a landmark located in Thomasville, North Carolina. It is a large-scale replica of a Duncan Phyfe armchair built in 1950 by Thomasville Furniture Industries. Before the current chair was built, a predecessor was built in September 1922. The original chair was 13 feet 6 inches (4.11 m) tall. The old chair was unfortunately made of pine instead of lasting material, which resulted in it being worn down over time. It was torn down in 1936, and the new chair did not occupy the spot until 1950. The current chair is 30 feet (9.1 m) tall and the seat is 10 feet 6 inches (3.20 m) wide, while being made from steel and concrete. The base is sculpted from Indiana limestone. In 1960, the chair received attention as Lyndon B. Johnson stood on the chair to wave to locals as he campaigned for the 1960 United States presidential election, in which he was the winning vice-presidential candidate.
