= American Home Furnishings Alliance =

Coordinates: 35.954388°N 80.009721°W

American Home Furnishings Alliance (AHFA)
- Type: Trade association
- Headquarters: High Point, North Carolina
- Region served: United States
- Chief Executive Officer: Andy Counts
- Website: http://www.ahfa.us/

The American Home Furnishings Alliance (AHFA), formerly the American Furniture Manufacturers Association, is an industry trade group which represents manufacturers and importers of home furnishings in the United States. It is based in High Point, North Carolina. The International Casual Furnishings Association (ICFA) is a division of the AHFA, as well as the Specialized Furniture Carriers.

== History ==
AHFA traces its history to the North Carolina Case Workers Association, formed in 1905 by 14 Southern furniture manufacturers in Gainsboro, North Carolina. James T. Ryan was the first executive director and served the group in that capacity for 54 years. Soon after NCCWA was established, manufacturers outside North Carolina began to join the organization. In 1911 the name was changed to the Southern Furniture Manufacturers Association to more accurately reflect the growing membership. Throughout its early years, the purpose of the SFMA was to disseminate the newest management and technical information to members and to act as a watchdog against burdensome regulatory requirements and government intervention.

In 1928, a similar organization, the National Association of Furniture Manufacturers, was formed in Chicago to provide these services to furniture manufacturers in the north. Although much of the residential furniture production shifted to the South after the Great Depression, Chicago remained the home of the largest furniture market, held each January at the American Furniture Mart.

During World War II, when all raw materials used for furniture were in short supply, SFMA representatives in Washington were successful in keeping furniture plants from closing altogether. Many manufacturers converted operations to make bunk beds, ammunition boxes and other equipment needed in the war effort. By 1947, the South was responsible for 33 percent of the nation's total furniture production. That year, SFMA created the Furniture Foundation to offer a furniture manufacturing and management curriculum at North Carolina State College in Raleigh.

During the 1950s, the thrust of the SFMA's efforts was on government controls affecting prices, materials and labor. The 1960s saw continued sales growth and a corresponding expansion in the association's services. Ryan retired in 1965 and the association established the James T. Ryan Award, now known as the Distinguished Service Award, in his honor in 1966.

Meanwhile, NAFM was also expanding in the north, establishing the Summer and Casual Furniture Manufacturers Association in 1959, and organizing an associate member division for suppliers in 1964. Later, when NAFM and SFMA merged in 1984 to form the American Furniture Manufacturers Association, the SCFMA and Suppliers Division would become key components in the new organization.

In 1993, imports represented roughly 25 percent of all wood household furniture sold in the United States and approximately 6 percent of upholstered household furniture. By 2002, imports had jumped to nearly 48 percent of the wood and 14 percent of the upholstered household furniture markets. In 2003, the AFMA Board of Directors began discussing potential changes to the Association to reflect the changing business models of many of its members.

On November 5, 2004, the Board voted to change the organization's name to the American Home Furnishings Alliance and to expand the membership criteria to embrace a broader cross-section of the U.S. home furnishings industry.

== See also ==
- Columbia Manufacturing Inc.
- England Furniture Incorporated
- Maine Cottage
