= Edgar E. Rand =

American heir, business executive & philanthropist (1905-1955)

- Born: c. 1905; St. Louis, Missouri, U.S.
- Died: October 26, 1955 (aged 49–50); Chicago, Illinois, U.S.
- Resting place: Bellefontaine Cemetery
- Education: Webb School
- Alma mater: Vanderbilt University
- Occupation: Businessman
- Spouse: Sarah Frances Moore (divorced)
- Parent(s): Frank C. Rand; Nettie Hale
- Relatives: Philip Henry Hale (maternal grandfather); Oscar Johnson (paternal uncle); Henry Hale Rand (brother); William R. Orthwein, Jr. (brother-in-law); J. Washington Moore (father-in-law)

Edgar E. Rand (c. 1905 – October 26, 1955) was an American heir, business executive and philanthropist. He served as the President of the International Shoe Company from 1950 to 1955.

== Early life ==
Rand was born c. 1905 in St. Louis, Missouri. His father, Frank Chambless Rand, served as the President of the International Shoe Company. His mother was Nettie Hale, the daughter of British-born Texas rancher, publisher and composer Philip Henry Hale.

Rand was educated in public schools. He went to Webb School, a prep school in Bell Buckle, Tennessee. Rand traveled in Europe and studied in Lausanne, Switzerland from 1922 to 1923. He returned to the United States and enrolled at Vanderbilt University in Nashville, Tennessee, in 1923, graduating in 1927.

== Career ==
Rand started his career at the International Shoe Company in 1927. He initially worked at their plant in Sikeston, Missouri. In 1939, he was elected to their Board of Directors.

At the outset of World War II, Rand joined the Office of Price Administration and the War Production Board, where he worked until 1944. From 1945 to 1946, he was an assistant to Democratic Senator Stuart Symington, the head of the War Assets Administration.

Rand returned to the International Shoe Company in 1947. He served as its Vice President from 1947 to 1950, and as its President from 1950 to 1955. In his first year as President, in 1950, he was forced to raise all prices up 10% for women's and children's shoes and up 20% for men's shoes due to the higher cost of raw materials. Meanwhile, in 1953, he decided to close down their plant in St. Charles, Missouri, and restructure their operations in Flora, Illinois, Windsor, Missouri, and Kirksville, Missouri. However, that same year, the company sales had gone up by 22% under his leadership. That same year, he opened a new plant in Bryan, Texas. A year later, the company acquired Savage Shoes Limited, a Canadian shoe manufacturer, in 1954. However, by 1955, members of the United Shoe Workers of America and the Boot and Shoe Workers of America, two labor unions, were striking against the company, demanding a 12% wage increase.

== Philanthropy ==
Rand served on the board of trustees of the Barnes Hospital in St. Louis. Additionally, he served on the board of trust of his alma mater, Vanderbilt University.

== Personal life ==
Rand married Sarah Frances Moore, the daughter of politician J. Washington Moore. They had three daughters: Mrs. Owen H. Mitchell, Jr., Mrs Donald S. Wohltman, and Miss Helen O. Rand. Rand and Moore divorced in 1951.

== Death and legacy ==
Rand died of a heart attack on October 26, 1955, while staying at the Hilton Hotel in Chicago, Illinois. His funeral took place at St. John's Methodist Church, and he was buried at the Bellefontaine Cemetery in St. Louis, Missouri.

At the time of his death, he was worth US$2,523,854. In his will, he bequeathed his estate to his three daughters via trusts. Meanwhile, his brother Henry Hale Rand served as the President of the International Shoe Company from 1955 to 1962.
