= Mohawk Industries =

American flooring manufacturer

Mohawk Industries, Inc
- Type: Public
- Traded as: NYSE: MHK; S&P 600 component
- Industry: Flooring manufacturing
- Founded: 1878; 148 years ago in Amsterdam, New York, United States
- Headquarters: Calhoun, Georgia, U.S.
- Area served: Worldwide
- Key people: Paul De Cock (Chief Executive Officer) Jeffrey Lorberbaum (Chairman)
- Revenue: ▲US$10.8 billion (2024)
- Operating income: ▲US$695 million (2024)
- Net income: ▲US$518 million (2024)
- Total assets: ▼US$12.8 billion (2024)
- Total equity: ▼US$7.55 billion (2024)
- Number of employees: 40,500 (2025)
- Website: mohawkind.com

Mohawk Industries is an American flooring manufacturer based in Calhoun, Georgia. Mohawk produces floor covering products for residential and commercial applications in North America and residential applications in Europe. The company manufacturing portfolio consists of soft flooring products (broadloom carpet, carpet tiles, carpet cushion and rugs), hard flooring products (ceramic and porcelain tile, natural stone and hardwood flooring), laminate flooring, sheet vinyl and luxury vinyl tile, natural stone and quartz countertops. In Europe, the company also produces and sells insulation, panels and mezzanine flooring. The company employs 40,500 people in operations in Australia, Brazil, Canada, Europe, Malaysia, Mexico, New Zealand, Russia and the United States. A Fortune 500 company, Mohawk is the world's largest flooring manufacturer.

== History ==
William Shuttleworth and his four sons arrived in the United States in 1875 from England and set up a carpet mill in the Hudson Valley upon arrival. After William Shuttleworth died, the four sons moved to Amsterdam, New York in 1878 and took over an empty factory there. The company incorporated as the Shuttleworth Brothers Company in 1902.

The company adopted the name Mohawk Carpet Mills (or Mohawk Mills, for short) in 1920, when it merged with McCleary, Wallin and Crouse, another mill in Amsterdam. It became the country's sole weaver to offer an entire line of domestic carpets, also creating the industry's first textured design and sculptured weave.

In 1956, Mohawk Carpet Mills merged with Alexander Smith, Inc. to become Mohasco Corporation, a company large enough to appear on the first Fortune 500 rankings. Mohasco faced competition from new tufted carpet operations in Georgia, which used synthetic fibers such as nylon and polyester rather than the traditional wool used in woven carpets. To compete in a changing industry, Mohasco gradually moved manufacturing south into the Carolinas and eventually Georgia. In 1963, the company turned some of its attention to furniture manufacturing through acquisitions.

Carpet manufacturing at the Amsterdam site ended by 1968 and the last corporate offices left by 1987. In 1988, Mohasco was purchased by MHS Holdings in a leveraged buyout, and the company's carpet business was spun off from Mohasco to form Mohawk Industries.

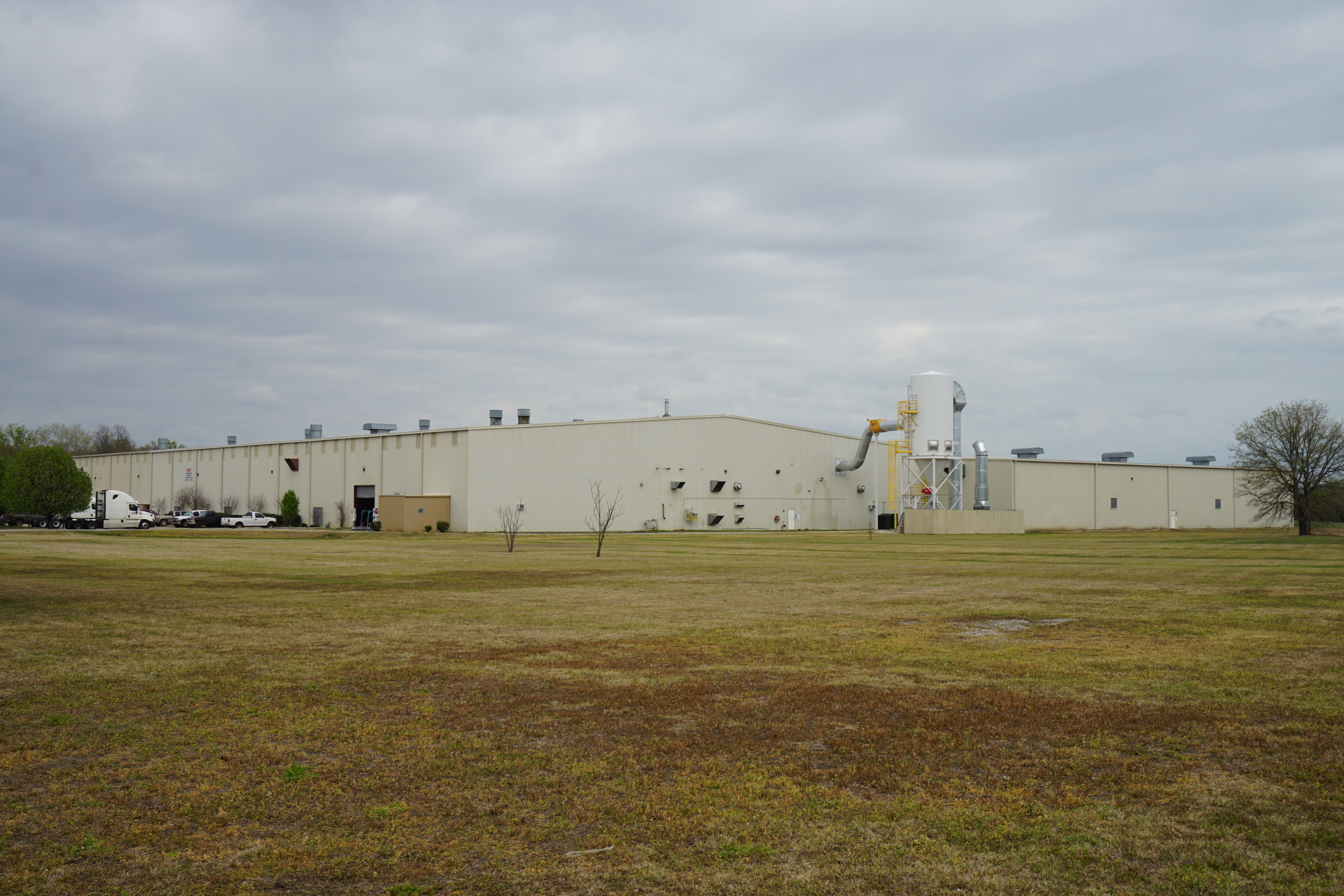
Mohawk Industries factory in Commerce, Texas

In 1992, Mohawk went public with its shares traded first on the NASDAQ Stock Exchange under the ticker symbol "MWK" and currently on the New York Stock Exchange under the ticker symbol "MHK." Mohasco's remaining assets were sold to other investors, and the company was later dissolved. Through 2025, Mohawk Industries has acquired 59 companies into its conglomerate, and now operates manufacturing facilities in 19 countries—the U.S., Mexico, Brazil, Ireland, the U.K., Belgium, France, the Netherlands, Germany, Luxembourg, Spain, Italy, Poland, Romania, Bulgaria, Russia, Malaysia, Australia and New Zealand. The company's present CEO is Paul De Cock, as of September 30, 2026, and the current board chair is Jeffrey Lorberbaum, who retired as CEO after 25 years.

Mohawk's open line brands include American Olean, Daltile, Decortiles, Durkan, Eliane, Feltex, Foss, Godfrey Hirst, Karastan, Kerama Marazzi, Marazzi, Moduleo, Mohawk, Mohawk Group, Mohawk Home, Pergo, Quick-Step, Ragno and Unilin.

== Controversies ==
=== Business Operations in Russia ===
In March 2022, Kyiv School of Economics listed Mohawk Industries in a report on their Leave Russia website of US-based companies that were still active in Russia after the 2022 Russian invasion of Ukraine.

== Mohawk Industries, Inc. v. Carpenter ==
In 2009, it was involved in the Supreme Court case Mohawk Industries, Inc. v. Carpenter. The court found against Mohawk Industries, in a 9–0 decision.
