= Roberts, Johnson and Rand-International Shoe Company Complex =

- U.S. National Register of Historic Places
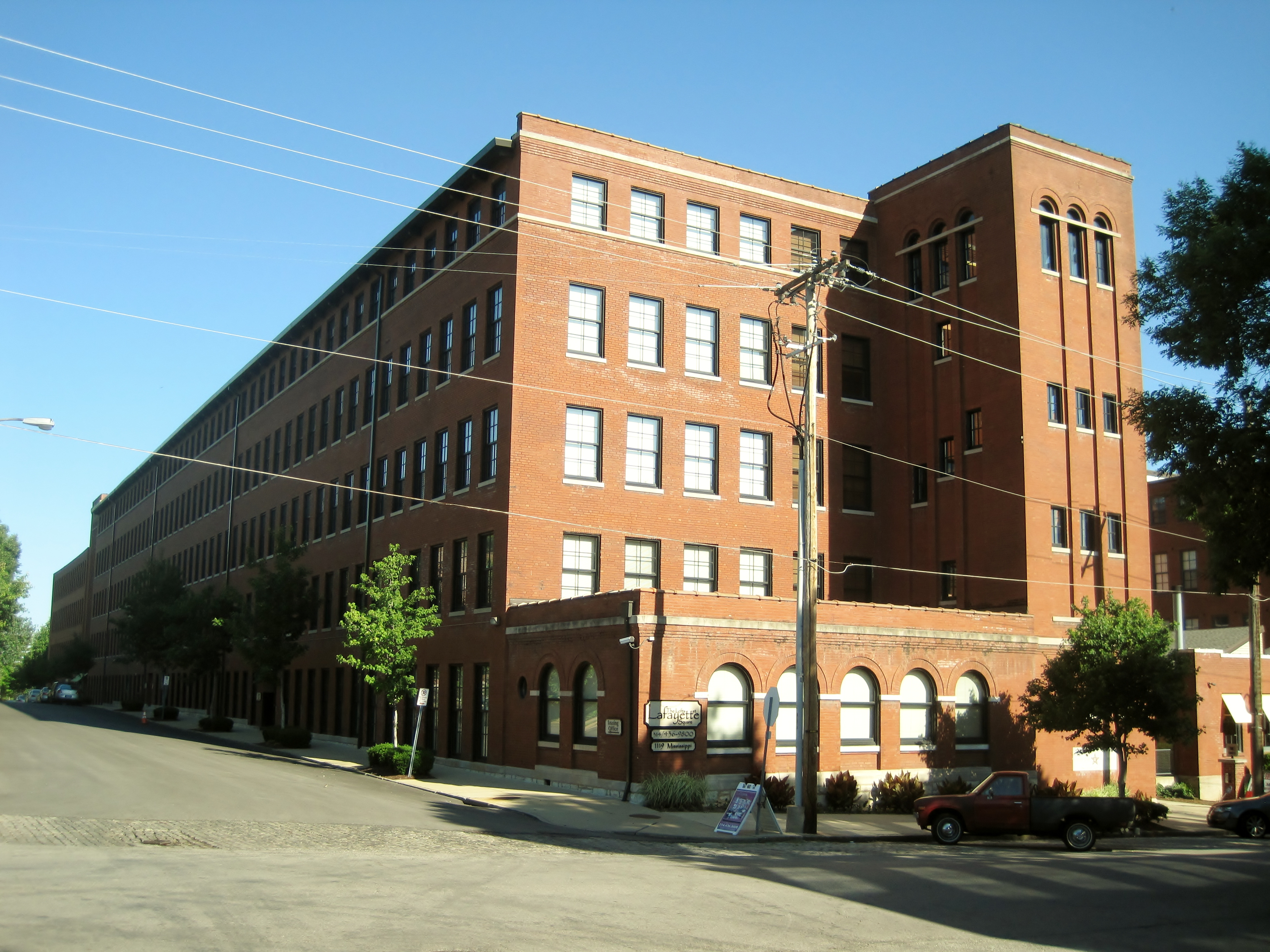
- The Roberts, Johnson and Rand-International Shoe Company Complex in 2012

- Location within St. Louis Location within Missouri Location within the United States
- Location: Mississippi and Hickory Streets, St. Louis, Missouri
- Coordinates: 38°37′10″N 90°12′47″W
- Area: 3 acres (1.2 ha)
- Built: 1903
- Architect: Theodore C. Link
- NRHP reference No.: 84002670
- Added to NRHP: August 23, 1984

The Roberts, Johnson and Rand-International Shoe Company Complex is a historic building in St. Louis, Missouri, USA.

== Location ==
The building is located on the corner of Mississippi Street and Hickory Street in St. Louis, Missouri.

== History ==
The building was erected for the Roberts, Johnson and Rand, a shoe manufacturing company later known as the International Shoe Company (which became Furniture Brands International). It was designed by German-born American architect Theodore C. Link. It is notable as one of the first St. Louis factories specifically designed for shoe production.

== Architectural significance ==
It has been listed on the National Register of Historic Places since August 23, 1984.
