= Thomasville Furniture Industries =

Defunct American furniture manufacturer

- Company type: Subsidiary
- Industry: Furniture manufacturing
- Founded: 1904 in Thomasville, North Carolina, United States
- Founder: Thomas Jefferson Finch, Charles F. Finch
- Defunct: 2014
- Fate: Ceased operations; brand acquired by Authentic Brands Group
- Headquarters: Thomasville, North Carolina, United States
- Parent: Authentic Brands Group

Thomasville Furniture Industries was a furniture manufacturer based in Thomasville, North Carolina, with dedicated galleries in more than 400 retail furniture stores. Additionally, there are 30 Thomasville Home Furnishing stores which carry only Thomasville products. The company had been a subsidiary of Clayton, Missouri-based Furniture Brands International since 1995. Heritage Home Group bought most of that company's assets in 2013 and announced Thomasville Furniture would cease operations in 2014, marking the end of an industry in the city.

Thomasville Cabinetry is crafted by MasterBrand Cabinets, Inc. a division of Fortune Brands Home and Security (FBHS). MasterBrand Cabinets produces Thomasville branded product for Thomasville Furniture Industries at several North American facilities, and sells the Thomasville Cabinetry brand exclusively through The Home Depot. Schrock Cabinetry of Illinois, for example, is one manufacturer that makes cabinets sold by the Home Depot with the Thomasville Cabinetry name stamped in it.

The famous Big Chair, an 18-foot reproduction of a Duncan Phyfe design (first erected in 1922 and rebuilt in 1951) still stands in the town square as a symbol of the mutual success of a now famous chair company - and the town that cherishes its nickname, "Chair City".

== History ==
Thomasville Furniture began as Thomasville Chair Company in 1904, making 500 to 1000 chairs a day by 1905. Thomas Jefferson Finch and Charles F. Finch of Randolph County bought the company in 1907.

Lambeth Furniture began in 1901 and was sold to Knox Furniture in 1928 and Thomasville Chair in 1932.

B.F. Huntley Furniture began in 1906 on Patterson Avenue in Winston-Salem, North Carolina and grew into the largest bedroom and dining room furniture manufacturer in the country. Its Winston-Salem plant burned in 1956, though a two-story office building built in 1921 remained and became part of a new plant. In 1961, Huntley Furniture and Thomasville Furniture Co. merged to become Thomasville Furniture Industries.

In 1968, Thomasville Furniture became part of Armstrong World Industries, which sold the company to Interco (later Furniture Brands International) in November 1995.

Starting with the Spring 2011 High Point Furniture Market, Thomasville Furniture Industries moved its showroom space from Thomasville to the International Home Furnishings Center. The five-story 225,000-square-foot former headquarters building, which was built in 1958 on East Main Street in Thomasville and also housed Drexel Heritage, was listed for sale in 2013. The 100 people still there were to be moved to Eastchester Drive in High Point, where Maitland-Smith and Henredon were located.

On January 21, 2014, TFI's new owner, Heritage Home Group, announced that the company would cease all operations on March 21. 84 jobs would be lost in Thomasville. HHG, however, moved to the city while work was being completed on its planned High Point headquarters.

With the sale of Lane Furniture, Heritage Home Group announced in 2017 that it would reorganize into three groups. Thomasville & Co. would include the Thomasville, Drexel and Henredon brands.

Heritage Home Group planned to sell Thomasville & Co. to one buyer. On August 31, 2018, Authentic Brands Group of New York City, known for buying businesses in trouble but also for outsourcing, made a bid. Thomasville Furniture was listed as a brand owned by Authentic Brands in 2024.

As of 2024, Thomasville remains a defunct manufacturer, though its former brand name is used for licensed home furnishings. Its previous factory sites in North Carolina and Virginia have been redeveloped or demolished for new industrial use.
