= William R. Webb =

American politician (1842–1926)

William Robert Webb
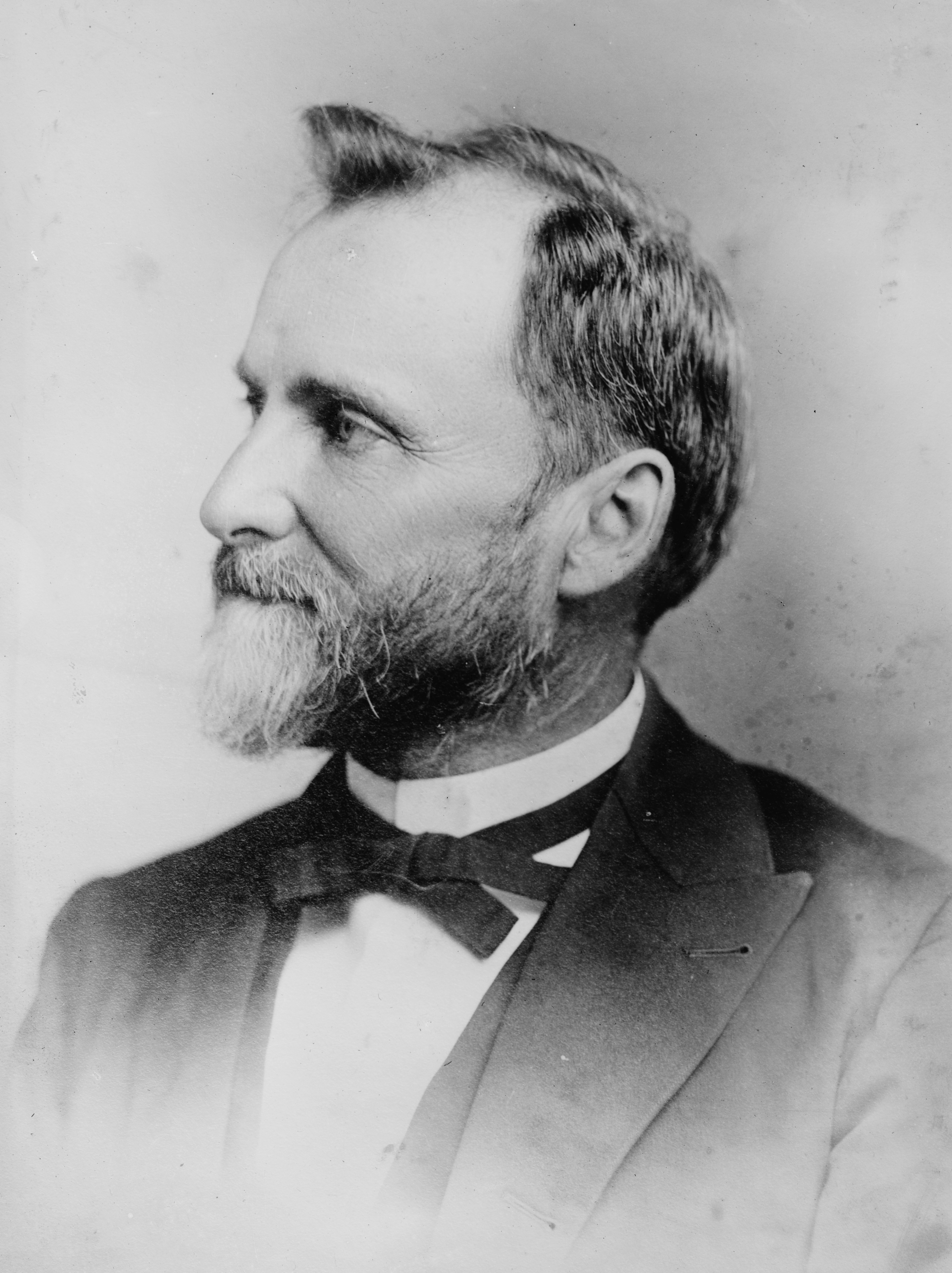

United States Senator from Tennessee
- In office January 24, 1913 – March 3, 1913
- Preceded by: Newell Sanders
- Succeeded by: John K. Shields

Personal details
- Born: November 11, 1842 Person County, North Carolina
- Died: December 19, 1926 (aged 84) Bell Buckle, Tennessee
- Party: Democratic
- Spouse: Emma Clary
- Children: William Robert, Jr. (1874–1960); Alla (1875–1944); John Stanford (1877–1951); Adeline (1879–1968); Susan (1882–1980); Emma (1884–1973); Thompson (1887–1975)
- Education: University of North Carolina at Chapel Hill
- Occupation: Soldier, Educator

William Robert Webb (November 11, 1842 – December 19, 1926) also known as "Sawney" Webb, was an American educator and politician who founded the Webb School and served briefly as a Democratic United States senator from Tennessee.

== Biography ==
Webb was born near Mount Tirzah in Person County, North Carolina. He was the grandson of Richard Stanford, an early ten-term United States representative from North Carolina. His father, Alexander Webb, died when he was six years old. He attended private schools, including the Bingham School in Oaks, North Carolina, and then matriculated at the University of North Carolina at Chapel Hill in 1860. However, he soon left to join the Confederate Army in the Fifteenth North Carolina Infantry Regiment, in which he served until badly wounded at the Battle of Malvern Hill on July 1, 1862. While recovering from his wounds, he again attended UNC. In the spring of 1864, he re-enlisted as a private in the Second North Carolina Cavalry Regiment and had risen to the rank of Captain by the time of his capture on April 3, 1865, after the Battle of Namozine Church. He was imprisoned on Hart's Island in western Long Island Sound and then transferred to Castle Garden at the southern tip of Manhattan in June, 1865, from which he escaped for a one-day adventure in the city. After the conclusion of the Civil War he returned to UNC, graduating in 1868 and subsequently teaching at Horner Military School in Oxford, North Carolina until 1870.

That year he moved to Tennessee and established The Webb School, a preparatory school in the small community of Culleoka. In 1886, after Culleoka incorporated and legalized the sale of liquor in the new city, he (being a prohibitionist) moved the Webb School to Bell Buckle, where it still exists today.

Webb married Emma Clary on April 23, 1873, and together they produced eight children: William Robert, Jr. (1874–1960), Alla (1875–1944), John Stanford (1877–1951), Adeline (1879–1968), Daniel Clary (1881–1954), Susan (1882–1980), Emma (1884–1973), and Thompson (1887–1975). His eldest son Will succeeded him as principal at the Webb School, and his youngest son Thompson founded the Webb School of California (now The Webb Schools) in Claremont in 1922.

He was elected to the United States Senate by the Tennessee General Assembly to fill the vacancy caused by the death of Senator Robert Love Taylor and served from January 24 to March 3, 1913. He was the last Confederate soldier to do so. Always a prohibitionist, he delivered his one speech in the Senate to support a law prohibiting interstate transport of liquor. He then returned to Bell Buckle and his school, dying there in 1926 and being buried at Hazel Cemetery.

U.S. Senate
Preceded by Newell Sanders	U.S. senator (Class 2) from Tennessee; 1913; Served alongside: Luke Lea	Succeeded by John K. Shields
