= Maine Cottage =

American furniture company

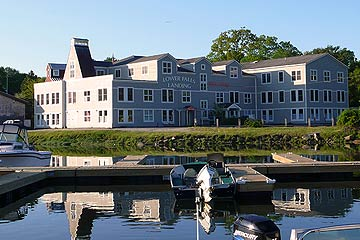
Maine Cottage Furniture headquarters and company store in Yarmouth, Maine

Maine Cottage is a privately held American furniture company specializing in high-end coastal cottage style furniture. Their product line includes painted solid wood, wicker and upholstered furniture. Customers can customize their furniture by selecting from exclusive paint colors and signature fabric patterns.

Originally started in Yarmouth, Maine in the United States, the operation is operated out of Annapolis, Maryland. Their products ship worldwide, and are available online and through a direct mail catalog.

== History ==
The company was founded in 1988 by Peter Bass and artist Carol Bass. It was originally located in Yarmouth, Maine in a restored cannery on the Royal River. Bass is the great-grandson of Wilton, Maine shoe maker G.H. Bass.

Maine Cottage was the first company to offer American Country, Early Shaker, and Mid Century Modern-inspired painted wood furniture in a multitude of original colors. The idea originated with artist Carol Bass painting and selling "found" pieces of cottage furniture.

== Russell & Mackenna ==
- In 2011, Maine Cottage was in financial distress and faced foreclosure. Competitor Russell & Mackenna acquired the intellectual property of Maine Cottage, product lines were merged and the resulting company continued to run using the name Maine Cottage.

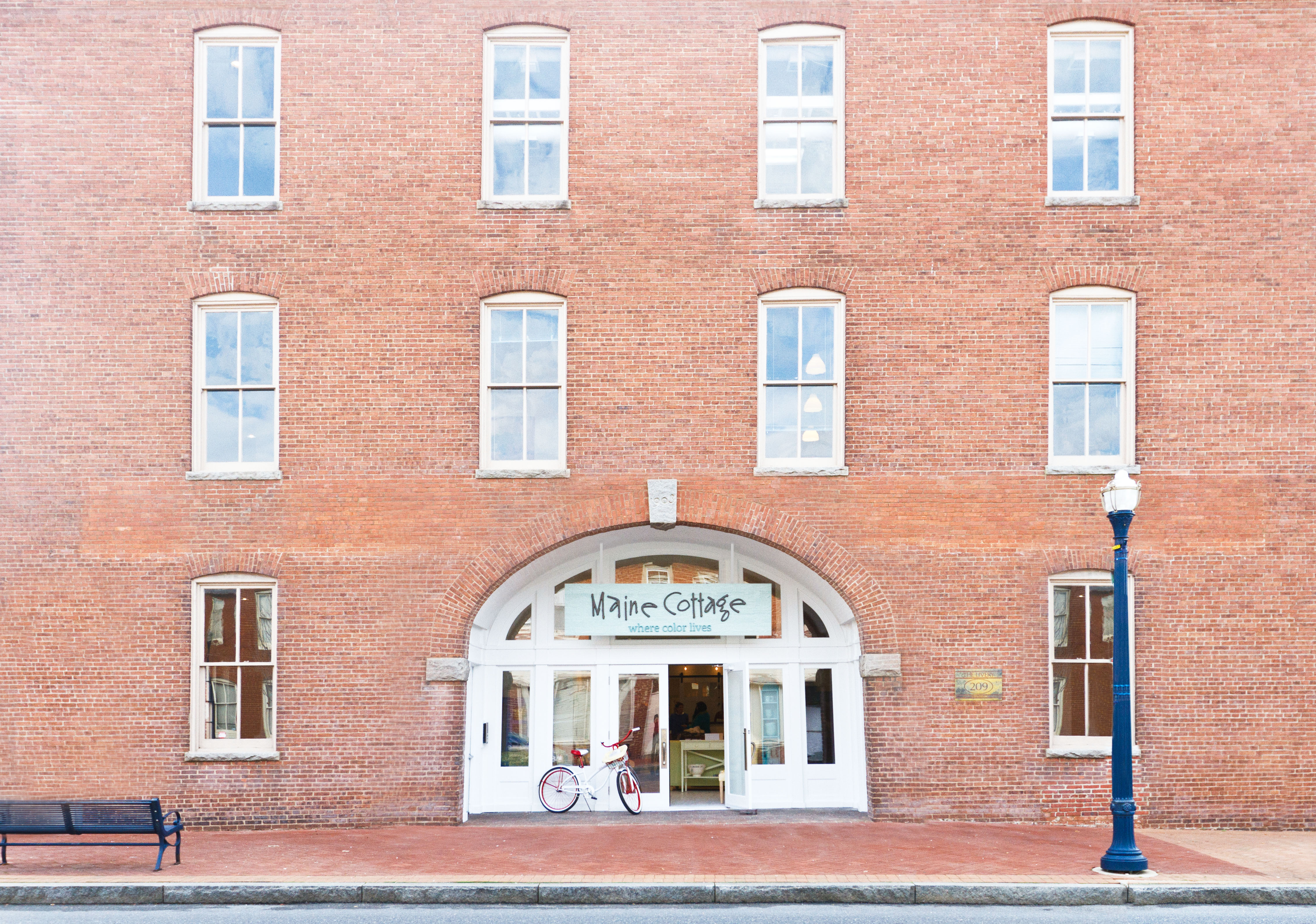
The Maine Cottage Flagship Store located in Annapolis, MD.

== Sales outlets ==
Maine Cottage operates an e-commerce website. Along with the digital channel, the company produces a coffee table style catalog, its “Color Book.”

== Products ==
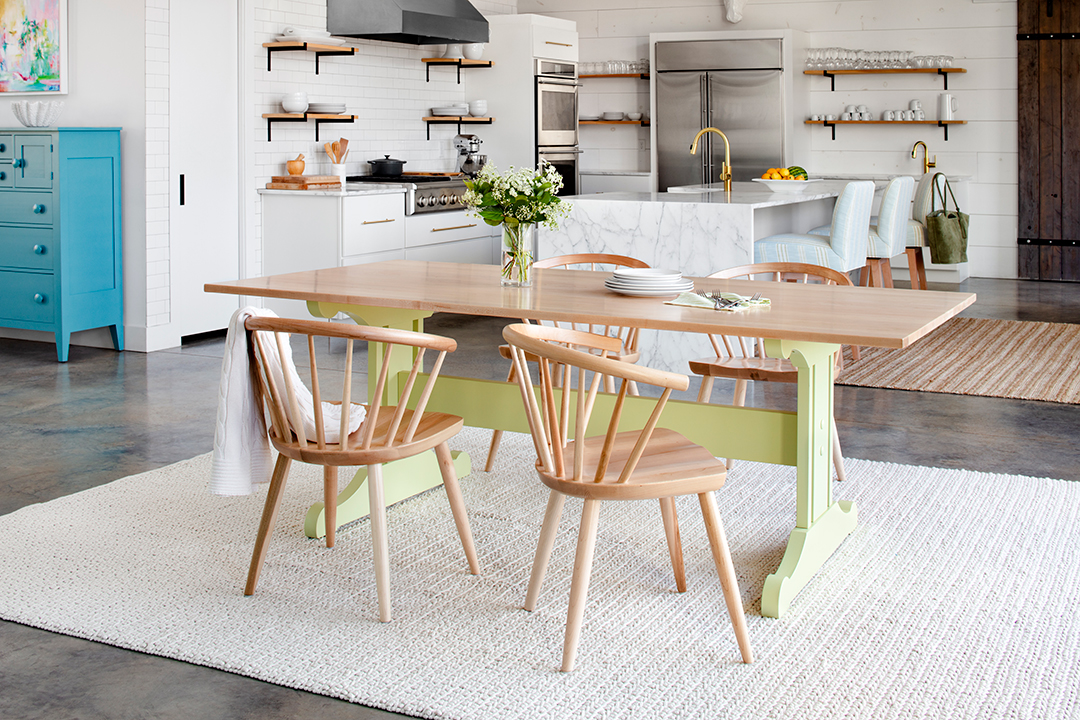
Maine Cottage Inga Trestle Dining Table in Sprout with Maple Top. Judy Chairs in Natural Maple.

Maine Cottage product lines include furniture, home decor accessories, signature fabrics, and exclusive paint colors. Their furniture lines include solid painted wood furniture, upholstered furniture, and wicker furniture. Painted furniture is bench built to order.
