= Mohawk Industries, Inc. v. Carpenter =

- Supreme Court of the United States

Argued October 5, 2009 Decided December 8, 2009
- Full case name: Mohawk Industries, Inc., Petitioner v. Norman Carpenter
- Citations: 558 U.S. 100 (more) 130 S. Ct. 599; 175 L. Ed. 2d 458; 2009 U.S. LEXIS 8942

Case history
- Prior: Carpenter v. Mohawk Industries, Inc., 548 F.3d 1048 (11th Cir. 2008); cert. granted, 555 U.S. 1152 (2009).
- Subsequent: Carpenter v. Mohawk Industries, Inc., 479 F. App'x 206 (11th Cir. 2012).

Holding
- Disclosure orders adverse to attorney–client privilege do not qualify for immediate appeal.

Court membership
- Chief Justice John Roberts Associate Justices John P. Stevens · Antonin Scalia; Anthony Kennedy · Clarence Thomas; Ruth Bader Ginsburg · Stephen Breyer; Samuel Alito · Sonia Sotomayor

Case opinions
- Majority: Sotomayor, joined by Roberts, Stevens, Scalia, Kennedy, Ginsburg, Breyer, Alito; Thomas (Part II–C)
- Concurrence: Thomas (in part)

Laws applied
- 28 U.S.C. § 1291

Mohawk Industries, Inc. v. Carpenter, 558 U.S. 100 (2009), is a United States Supreme Court case in which the Court held that disclosure orders adverse to attorney–client privilege do not qualify for immediate appeal under the collateral order doctrine.

This opinion is notable, as being the first Supreme Court opinion authored by Justice Sonia Sotomayor. In addition, this is the first time a Supreme Court opinion used the term "undocumented immigrant" - the term "illegal immigrant" having appeared in a dozen earlier opinions.

== Background ==
Norman Carpenter, a Mohawk shift supervisor, had e-mailed Mohawk’s human resources department, claiming that the company was employing undocumented immigrants. Carpenter was directed to meet with a lawyer representing the company, who allegedly pressured Carpenter to recant his statements. Carpenter alleged that he was terminated when he failed to do so. Carpenter filed suit in the U.S. District Court for the Northern District of Georgia, which granted his motion to compel Mohawk to produce information regarding Carpenter’s meeting with the Mohawk lawyer, finding that the company had waived the privilege of attorney–client confidentiality. The U.S. Court of Appeals for the 11th Circuit affirmed, and the U.S. Supreme Court granted certiorari to resolve a conflict amongst the circuit courts of appeals.

=== Question presented ===
Do disclosure orders adverse to the attorney–client privilege qualify for immediate appeal under the collateral order doctrine?

== Opinion of the Court ==
Under Cohen v. Beneficial Industrial Loan Corp., a party may immediately appeal a district court order if it: 1) conclusively determines the disputed issue; 2) resolves an important issue completely separate from the merits of the action; and 3) is effectively unreviewable on appeal from a final judgment.

The Court agreed with the Court of Appeals, that the third prong of the Cohen requirements is not met, because there are adequate remedies available upon an appeal from a final judgment where there was a discovery order adverse to attorney–client privilege. Although the Court acknowledged the importance of the attorney–client privilege, it reasoned that there are many other important rights that litigants must wait to vindicate until after the entry of final judgment. Appellate courts can remedy improper disclosure of privileged materials the same way erroneous evidentiary rulings are remedied: by vacating judgment and remanding the matter back to the district court for a new trial in which the protected material and its fruits are excluded.

The Court also reasoned that the possibility of a disclosure order and a delayed potential appeal is unlikely to interfere with attorney–client communications.

The Court noted that parties subject to an adverse disclosure order regarding attorney–client privilege have other options besides a collateral order appeal, such as the certification and acceptance of an interlocutory appeal under 28 U.S.C. Section 1292(b), petitioning for a writ of mandamus, or by defying the order and incurring court-imposed sanctions such as a contempt of court citation which is immediately appealable.

The Court predicted that including privilege-related disclosure orders within the category of collateral orders would not justify the institutional cost, because it would delay the resolution of cases in the district courts and would unnecessarily burden the Courts of Appeals.

The collateral order doctrine does not extend to disclosure orders adverse to the attorney–client privilege.
