= Jeffrey Lorberbaum =

American billionaire

Jeffrey S. Lorberbaum
- Born: October 24, 1954 (age 71)
- Education: University of Denver
- Occupation: Businessman
- Known for: Chairman and CEO of Mohawk Industries
- Spouse: Sarah Lorberbaum
- Children: Lauren Lorberbaum-Donohue; Brian Lorberbaum
- Parent(s): Alan Lorberbaum; Shirley Lorberbaum

Jeffrey Lorberbaum (born October 24, 1954) is an American billionaire and the chairman and chief executive officer of Calhoun, Georgia-based Mohawk Industries, the world's largest flooring company.

== Early life and education ==
Jeffrey S. Lorberbaum is the son of Shirley and Alan Lorberbaum, migrants to the South from New York City. In 1957, his parents founded Aladdin Mills, Inc., in Dalton, Georgia. Aladdin initially produced bathmats and rugs for discount retailers and during the 1970s expanded into tufted carpet manufacturing, eventually growing the business into one of the largest carpet manufacturers in the country. He has one sister, Suzanne Helén of Denver, and one brother, Mark Lorberbaum of Miami Beach. He graduated with a B.A. from the University of Denver.

== Career ==
Jeffrey joined the family business, carpet and rug manufacturer Aladdin Mills, in 1976, after graduating from the University of Denver. Lorberbaum held a number of leadership positions, eventually serving as vice president of operations from 1986 to 1994.

In 1994, Aladdin merged with Mohawk Industries, which had gone public in 1992, creating one of the largest flooring manufacturers in the United States – and his father became Mohawk's largest shareholder. Jeffrey and Alan Lorberbaum then joined Mohawk's board of directors.

In 1995, Lorberbaum became president of Mohawk; and, in 2001, he became CEO. Since then he has grown the company to $5.8 billion in revenues (2012) partly through acquisitions that expanded the scope of the company into hard surface flooring (ceramic tile, laminate, hard wood) and provided access to new geographies.

In 2002, Lorberbaum orchestrated the $1.8 billion (~$2.99 billion in 2024) purchase of Dal-Tile of Dallas making Mohawk the world's largest tile-maker. In 2005, Mohawk purchased Unilin, a Belgium-based maker of laminate flooring and MDF board (a composite used in do-it-yourself furniture) for $2.6 billion (~$4 billion in 2024).

In 2023, Lorberbaum's total compensation from Mohawk was $4.4 million, or 103 times the median employee pay at Mohawk for that year.

== Personal life ==
Lorberbaum is married to Sarah Lorberbaum. They live in Chattanooga, Tennessee. They have two children, a daughter, Lauren, who works as a consultant at PwC Advisory in New York City, and a son, Brian, an ex-associate of Mohawk Industries.

As of August 2016, Lorberbaum holds 9.6 million shares of Mohawk amounting to 14 percent of the company which is valued at $2.14 billion (~$2.73 billion in 2024).
