= Furniture Brands International =

American home furnishings company

Furniture Brands International, Inc.
- Formerly: International Shoe Company (1911–1966); Interco (1966–1996)
- Industry: Furniture
- Founded: 1911; 115 years ago
- Defunct: 2013
- Fate: Chapter 11 bankruptcy
- Headquarters: Clayton, Missouri, United States

Furniture Brands International, Inc. was an American home furnishings company headquartered in Clayton, Missouri, United States. The company began in 1911 as International Shoe Company with the merger of Roberts, Johnson & Rand Shoe Company and Peters Shoe Company. In 1966, the company changed its name to Interco as the result of diversification, and once the company exited the shoe business, adopted the name Furniture Brands International. Some of the brands it owned in the furniture industry included Broyhill, Thomasville, Drexel Heritage, Henredon, Hickory Chair, Pearson, Laneventure, and Maitland-Smith. In 2013, Furniture Brands filed for Chapter 11 bankruptcy and announced plans to sell most of its divisions. New owner KPS Capital Partners announced the formation of Heritage Home Group on November 25 of that year.

== History ==
=== International Shoe Company ===
At age 16 in the 1870s, Henry W. Peters went to work for Claflin, Allen & Company, at a time when St. Louis, Missouri, had wholesale distributors of shoes rather than manufacturers. As Peters moved up in the company, the city's production of shoes increased from a half-million in 1883 to nine times that, and Claflin, Allen & Company was one of the largest shoe makers. Peters became president and then left in 1891 to form his own company, Peters Shoe Company, with help from relatives. Peters Shoe Company started with $200,000 in capital and almost doubled in size in its first decade, requiring a move from 7th Street and Washington Avenue to a larger building at 11th Street and Washington. Isaac S. Taylor designed the eight-story headquarters built in 1901 at 13th Street and Washington, which was named to the National Register of Historic Places in 1984.

Brothers Jackson and Oscar Johnson, and their cousin Frank C. Rand, moved from Mississippi to Memphis, Tennessee, in 1892 and started the Johnson, Carruthers & Rand Shoe Company. Henry O. Rand, father of Frank, and John C. Roberts were financial backers. In 1898, the Johnsons sold their company and moved to St. Louis to start Roberts, Johnson & Rand Shoe Company. Frank Rand, a graduate of Vanderbilt University, became a stock clerk and advanced to become vice-president. A headquarters building went up at 15th Street and Washington in 1909.

By 1905, St. Louis had moved from ninth to third in the country in shoe production. Peters Shoe Company had continued significant growth, and its products sold all over the United States and even in Mexico and Europe. The two largest shoe companies in the city, Roberts, Johnson & Rand and Peters Shoe Company, merged in 1911 to form International Shoe Company, but each company kept its own identity. Peters Shoe remained in its own building, with Weatherbird Shoes on display, until 1930, when the company moved into what had become the International Shoe Building. Washington Avenue became known as "Shoe Street U.S.A." because it "claimed more shoe trade than any other street in the world".

Jackson Johnson became president of International Shoe Company, succeeded in 1915 by his brother Oscar, who died in 1916. Frank Rand took over as president. Jackson Johnson remained chairman until he died in 1929. The company became known for quality shoes at low to moderate prices. World War I resulted in significant demand for military footwear.

International Shoe Company incorporated in Delaware March 16, 1921. At the time the company had 32 factories in Missouri, Illinois, and Kentucky and had just bought a tannery business, Kistler, Lesh & Co. Also that year, the company bought W.H. McElwaine Company of Boston, with about 5,000 workers and numerous operations in New Hampshire. The company was doing well but was unionized, while International Shoe was not. A recession caused McElwaine to propose wage cuts, which caused United Shoe Workers to call for a strike. The sale, intended as a solution to this problem, resulted in a Federal Trade Commission challenge under the Clayton Antitrust Act. The Supreme Court ruled in 1930 that the merger could take place. Without a union, workers had to grudgingly accept the inevitable layoffs and wage reductions which kept the company profitable. The company found itself in the Supreme Court again in 1945. Its practice of soliciting in-person offers and fulfilling them in a state separate from its retail locations was the subject of a landmark case, International Shoe Co. v. Washington, that came to be taught in law schools across the country.

In addition to Weatherbird, International Shoe Company made Red Goose shoes, and in 1922 the company added Poll Parrot, named for Paul Parrot, who had a parrot in his shoe store. The Hannibal, Missouri, plant, that started in 1898 with a million pairs a year by 1908, made Poll Parrot and Star shoes.

Frank Rand led International Shoe through a time of major growth and through the difficulties created by the Great Depression. With Jackson Johnson's death, Rand moved into the chairman's slot and served in that position until his death in 1949. William H. Moulton, who had joined Roberts, Johnson & Rand in 1908, took over as president, serving until his 1939 retirement. International Shoe not only endured the Depression but thrived, due to lower prices increasing demand for shoes, and the lack of labor trouble. Eventually, most International Shoe plants organized because the New Deal outlawed the company's strategies to prevent unionization. The National Labor Relations Board had to act to allow workers in Hannibal to organize. Byron Gray, an employee since 1909, became president in 1939.

World War II gave International Shoe a major opportunity, as it was the only shoe company large enough to bid for all the business of the U.S. Army. The company had 30,000 employees and became by far the U.S. government's largest supplier of footwear during the war, despite opposition by labor unions. Consumer demand also increased, and in 1944 International Shoe once again reached its 1929 production levels.

By 1950, International Shoe had the capability to make 70 million pairs of shoes a year; its businesses also included tanneries, rubber heels, cement, containers, and material for shoe linings. Rand's death the previous year began a change in the company's outlook as the Rand family influence began to decrease. Frank Rand's sons Edgar E. Rand and Henry Hale Rand both served as president, but the company began a period of diversification due to the influence of Maurice R. Chambers even before he became president in 1962. Major acquisitions included high-end shoe maker Florsheim in 1952, Canada's largest shoe maker, Savage Shoes, Ltd., in 1954, and Caribe Shoe Corporation of Puerto Rico in 1958. That last deal led to the closing of a plant in Chester, Illinois, that had operated since 1916 and was making 5,000 shoes a day. A retail division began in 1959, and International Shoe began buying companies in other countries and even in businesses other than shoes.

=== Interco ===
International Shoe Company became Interco Inc. on March 1, 1966. The new name reflected the company strategy of buying businesses in many different areas. Interco had three major divisions—apparel, footwear, and retailing. From 1964 to 1978, the company bought 20 other manufacturers or retailers as well as Central Hardware. Under Chambers, plants started closing and some shoes were imported from such places as Italy. Overall, by the mid-1970s, 44 percent of shoes in the U.S. came from other countries. But Chambers' strategies kept Interco successful, reaching a billion dollars with consistent growth in sales and earnings. Chambers moved to the chairman's job in 1976, with William H. Edwards Jr. taking over as president, but continuing Chambers' policies.

On April 31, 1978, Interco acquired International Hat Company and its six factories, as part of Interco's expansion into the apparel industry. In 1980, Interco added furniture as a major division. That year the company bought Ethan Allen Inc. for $150 million. In 1980 Interco took over Broyhill Furniture, a North Carolina company that was the world's largest privately owned furniture maker, with 20 factories and 7,500 employees. Paul Broyhill remained as CEO for five more years, leaving when Interco made changes with which he did not agree. In 1987, under new president Harvey Saligman, Interco bought Lane Company of Altavista, Virginia, which increased furniture and home furnishings to about one-third of Interco's total sales.

Also under Saligman, Interco bought Converse in 1986. Footwear and furniture were the company's most profitable areas, and the goal was to sell other businesses. Unfortunately, due to the costs of buying Converse and Lane, Interco itself appeared by this time to be a takeover target, more profitable as a group of separate companies to be sold than as a single unit. In 1988, Steven M. Rales and his brother Mitchell led a group that offered $2.47 billion, but that bid ran into trouble when the SEC charged Drexel Burnham Lambert with insider trading, making financing of the bid more difficult. Interco took on debt to discourage other offers, and the Rales group eventually backed off. But Interco could not make enough money by selling its unprofitable operations; For example, selling Ethan Allen brought in $388 million rather than the expected $550 million. The company's debt had jumped from $300 million in 1988 to $2.6 billion in 1989, and operations were not producing enough income to cover the payments. On July 31, 1990, an agreement with creditors to extend loan maturities to 1997 was intended to avoid bankruptcy.

In 1989, Richard Loynd, Converse's chairman and the leader of his company's buyout effort, became Interco president. Interco filed for Chapter 11 in January 1991 and sold all of its operations except Broyhill, Lane, Converse, and Florsheim. Apollo Investment Fund, Ltd., led by Drexel Burnham Lambert's Leon Black, took a controlling interest in the reorganized Interco, which emerged from bankruptcy in August 1992. In 1994, Interco exited the shoe business, selling Converse and Florsheim. Brown Shoe Company took over the rights to Red Goose. A former International Shoe Company warehouse in St. Louis became the City Museum.

Armstrong World Industries sold Thomasville Furniture Industries to Interco in November 1995 in a $331 million deal. Interco had over $1 billion in revenues at the time.

=== Furniture Brands International ===
Interco became Furniture Brands International on March 1, 1996. That same year, Mickey Holliman of the Action Industries subsidiary succeeded Loynd as president. Holliman had made his company into the leader in the motion furniture segment. His strategy of focusing on furniture proved successful, and by 1999 Furniture Brands International had fifteen straight quarters of increased earnings. Thomasville Furniture, the third manufacturer, and a deal with retailer Haverty's to devote significant space to Furniture Brands, contributed to the company's positive outlook.

Late in 2001, Masco announced Furniture Brands International would buy Henredon, Drexel Heritage and Maitland-Smith for $275 million, in a deal expected to return Furniture Brands to the number one U.S. furniture manufacturer, a title lost to La-Z-Boy when that company bought LADD in 2000. The three companies, which gave Furniture Brands a top position in premium furniture, became the High Point, North Carolina–based subsidiary HDM Furniture Industries, Inc. in 2005. Drexel Heritage CEO Jeff Young became the CEO. Also that year, HDM announced plans to move upholstery manufacturing in High Point to the Drexel Heritage location, closing the Henredon plant and moving some operations to Mount Airy, North Carolina.

Despite a decline in the industry as a whole, Furniture Brands continued to be successful and expanded into retail. In 2007, Furniture Brands announced that Thomasville and Drexel Heritage would increase the number of company-owned stores for their products, but that Broyhill and Lane would close their St. Louis-area stores and focus on selling through furniture stores that sold other brands. At the time, the Designer Brands group included Henredon, Hickory Chair, Laneventure, Maitland-Smith, and Pearson.

In 2008, intending to focus on homes rather than businesses, Furniture Brands announced the sale of Hickory Business Furniture to HNI Corporation for $75 million. Also that year, Henredon moved its headquarters to one of its High Point plants that year, and Drexel Heritage moved in with Thomasville Furniture. And with Henredon's 15-year contract to manufacture Ralph Lauren furniture ending, the company dropped the position of Henredon Furniture president, with the Designer Group president taking over that role. This was part of a companywide strategy to consolidate back office departments in what had been separate companies.

Also in 2008, the Drexel Heritage/Henredon plant in High Point closed. This left the company with two High Point plants, and one each in Thomasville and Mt. Airy. This brought the total number of N.C. jobs cut by Furniture Brands to 8726, 2740 of those in the Triad, since 2000, during which time the company had also closed 39 of 57 U.S. plants.

On July 10, 2008, Furniture Brands said it would move its headquarters to Clayton, Missouri. The number of employees at the new site would increase from about 75 to about 225. At the same time, the company was changing from a holding company to an operating company; certain departments would move from the company's divisions to headquarters, but any job related to a specific brand would remain at the appropriate division. State and county incentives worth $4 million played a role in the decision. The company completed its 52,000 square feet (4,800 m^{2}) headquarters in two stories of 14-story Shaw Park Plaza in October.

In 2009, Thomasville, Drexel Heritage, Henredon, and Maitland-Smith made their debut at the Las Vegas Furniture Market, where Broyhill and Lane had been exhibiting since 2005.

For the 2009 High Point Market, Maitland-Smith moved its showroom into that of Henredon and moved its outlet from Tomlinson Road to its Penny Road office.

Furniture Brands' market capitalization (or total value of its shares) fell from $1.8 billion in 2004 to $31 million in 2013. The company has lost money every year since 2007 and was delisted from the New York Stock Exchange twice in less than a year. Analyst Budd Bugatch of Raymond James & Associates compared Furniture Brands board members to the pigs in George Orwell's Animal Farm.

On September 9, 2013, Furniture Brands filed for Chapter 11 bankruptcy. The company planned to sell all businesses other than Lane Furniture to a group managed by Oaktree Capital Management LP. On October 2, a judge approved a $280 million stalking horse offer by KPS Capital Partners. On November 4, Samson Holding Ltd., the largest stockholder, announced its intention to bid but that bid never took place, and on November 22, a judge approved the KPS bid. KPS announced the name Heritage Home Group LLC for the new owner of "substantially all of the assets" of Furniture Brands on November 25. Also announced at that time was the resignation of Furniture Brands chairman and CEO Ralph Scozzafava. Ira Glazer became Heritage president and CEO.

Furniture Brands International became FBI Wind Down Inc., and chief administrative officer and general counsel Meredith Graham was put in charge of liquidation. Heritage Home Group was considered a subsidiary of FBI Wind Down. FBI Wind Down cancelled its stock effective August 1, 2014 but continued to dispose of former Furniture Brands properties.

FBI Wind Down sold four more Furniture Brands properties to 21 BC LLC in 2015. In High Point, sites on Fairfield Road and Copeland Avenue were included. Thomasville and Morganton locations were also sold.

== See also ==
- Columbia Manufacturing Inc.
- Bailey v. Drexel Furniture Co.
- Maine Cottage
- England Furniture Incorporated
- American Home Furnishings Alliance
- International Hat Company
