= Ralph Scozzafava =

American business executive

- Born: November 4, 1958 (age 67); Danbury, Connecticut, United States
- Occupation: Business executive
- Known for: Chief Executive Officer of Dean Foods 2017-2019
- Spouse: Liz
- Children: 2

Ralph Scozzafava is an American business executive who is best known for his position as chief executive officer at Dean Foods, the largest fluid milk company in the United States, from January 1, 2017, to July 29, 2019. He previously served as the company's chief operating officer and joined Dean Foods in 2014 as the company's chief commercial officer.

== Early life and education ==
Scozzafava was born on November 4, 1958, in Danbury, Connecticut, and graduated from Immaculate High School. He attended the University of Pacific in Stockton, California, where he majored in business and played college basketball. He went on to receive an MBA from the University of Rhode Island in Kingston, Rhode Island, and completed the KMI graduate program at the Kellogg School of Management at Northwestern University in Evanston, Illinois.

== Career ==
Scozzafava took his first job with Warner Lambert in 1982 and spent the next decade in business management with companies including Johnson & Johnson and Clorox. From 1996 to 2000 Scozzafava served in various executive positions at the Campbell Soup Company. In 2000 he joined the confectionery company Wrigley in their US business unit. He was vice president, U.S. sales and customer marketing from 2001 to 2002, vice president and general manager for U.S. from 2002 to 2003, vice president and managing director for North America/Pacific from 2004 to 2006, and head of worldwide commercial operations from March 1, 2006, to February 1, 2007, when he left the company. During his tenure he managed a $5 billion business with over 10,000 employees.

In 2007 he joined Furniture Brands International as vice chairman of the board and became chief executive officer of the company on January 1, 2008. On May 1, 2008, he also became chairman of the board. Scozzafava took the position as CEO after a six-month apprenticeship in the furniture industry under prior Furniture Brands International CEO Mickey Holliman, during which time he held the title of CEO-designate. His first two years with the company resulted in a financial turn-around for the firm. In 2010 he signed a three-year contract extension through June 30, 2013. He was a director of Stage Stores from 2012 to 2017. and the American Home Furnishings Alliance, Inc.

== Philanthropy ==
Ralph Scozzafava served as a director for the St. Louis YMCA. His past positions have included chairman of the board for Keep America Beautiful Inc., and as a director of the Boston-based Center on Media and Child Health, and the Chicago-based Heartland Alliance.

== Personal life ==
He is married to Liz and has two children.
