= National Register of Historic Places listings in Marshall County, Mississippi =

Location of Marshall County in Mississippi

This is a list of the National Register of Historic Places listings in Marshall County, Mississippi.

This is intended to be a complete list of the properties and districts on the National Register of Historic Places in Marshall County, Mississippi, United States. Latitude and longitude coordinates are provided for many National Register properties and districts; these locations may be seen together in a map.

There are 22 properties and districts listed on the National Register in the county. Another property was once listed but has been removed.

This National Park Service list is complete through NPS recent listings posted September 25, 2026.

== Current listings ==
	Name on the Register	Image	Date listed	Location	City or town	Description
1	Dr. Isham G. Bailey House	Dr. Isham G. Bailey House	August 30, 2001 (#01000919)	1577 Early Grove Rd. 34°59′11″N 89°22′41″W	Lamar	
2	Byhalia Historic District	Byhalia Historic District	March 7, 1996 (#96000256)	Roughly along Church, Chulahoma (Mississippi Highway 309) and Senter Sts. 34°52′10″N 89°41′27″W	Byhalia	Contributing properties include Thistledome.
3	Byhalia United Methodist Church		April 9, 1984 (#84002276)	College Ave. 34°52′12″N 89°41′31″W	Byhalia	
4	Chalmers Institute		June 28, 1982 (#82003107)	W. Chulahoma Ave. 34°46′01″N 89°27′25″W	Holly Springs	
5	Civil War Earthworks at Tallahatchie Crossing	Civil War Earthworks at Tallahatchie Crossing	August 14, 1973 (#73001021)	Off Mississippi Highway 7; 34°33′25″N 89°29′16″W	Abbeville vicinity	Eight mounds that were parapets used for Union cannons
6	Confederate Armory Site		April 11, 1972 (#72000699)	In northern Holly Springs; 34°46′43″N 89°26′06″W	Holly Springs	Location in NRIS has the incorrect longitude
7	Depot-Compress Historic District	Depot-Compress Historic District	April 20, 1983 (#83000959)	Bounded by the railroad tracks, Chesterman St., and College and Van Dorn Aves. 34°46′05″N 89°26′07″W	Holly Springs	
8	East Holly Springs Historic District	East Holly Springs Historic District	April 20, 1983 (#83000960)	Bounded by Compress, Chesterman, Randolph, and Spring Sts. and Salem and Van Dorn Aves. 34°46′11″N 89°26′27″W	Holly Springs	Includes Cedarhurst a Gothic Revival style residence identified also identified as the Sherwood Bonner house
9	Hillcrest Cemetery	Hillcrest Cemetery	June 28, 1982 (#82003108)	Center St. 34°45′46″N 89°26′47″W	Holly Springs	
10	Holly Springs Courthouse Square Historic District	Holly Springs Courthouse Square Historic District	January 20, 1980 (#80004550)	U.S. Route 78; 34°46′05″N 89°26′52″W	Holly Springs	
11	McCoy Administration Building	McCoy Administration Building	March 19, 1998 (#98000254)	150 E. Rust Ave. 34°46′34″N 89°26′49″W	Holly Springs	
12	Mississippi Industrial College Historic District	Mississippi Industrial College Historic District	January 20, 1980 (#80002290)	Memphis St.; also roughly bound by N. Memphis Street, W. Valley Ave., tree line that abuts the back lot of Holly Springs International School, and Rust College Right of Way; 34°46′32″N 89°26′57″W	Holly Springs	Second set of address represent a boundary increase was approved September 30, 2026.
13	Myers-Hicks Place	Myers-Hicks Place	March 7, 1983 (#83000961)	Mississippi Highway 309; 34°49′47″N 89°41′19″W	Byhalia vicinity	
14	Newsom - Adams Family Farm House		December 7, 2023 (#100009585)	461 Adam Springs Road; 34°34′42″N 89°27′14″W	Waterford	
15	North Memphis Street Historic District	North Memphis Street Historic District	April 20, 1983 (#83000962)	Bounded by N. Memphis St., Falconer, Salem, and Park Aves., and the Anderson Chapel; 34°46′13″N 89°26′55″W	Holly Springs	
16	Oakview		June 28, 1982 (#82003110)	Rust Ave. on the Rust College campus 34°46′32″N 89°26′46″W	Holly Springs	
17	Old Philadelphia Church		February 9, 2021 (#100006142)	Corner of Harris Ln. and North Red Banks Rd. 34°49′56″N 89°33′53″W	Red Banks	
18	Old Water and Electric Light Plant	Old Water and Electric Light Plant	June 28, 1982 (#82003111)	140 E. Falconer Ave. 34°46′09″N 89°26′50″W	Holly Springs	
19	Robert Raiford Home and Farm		August 28, 1998 (#98001110)	829 Cayce Rd. 34°52′10″N 89°37′37″W	Victoria	
20	Southwest Holly Springs Historic District	Southwest Holly Springs Historic District	April 20, 1983 (#83000963)	Bounded by S. Center, S. Memphis, and Craft Sts., Marbury Ct., and Chulahoma, Gholson, Elder and Mason Aves. 34°45′51″N 89°27′04″W	Holly Springs	
21	Summer Trees		January 19, 1979 (#79001331)	Northeast of Red Banks on Mayhome Rd. 34°52′05″N 89°32′54″W	Red Banks	
22	Wall Doxey State Park	Wall Doxey State Park	December 1, 1997 (#97001437)	Between Mississippi Highway 7 and Spring Lake; 34°39′51″N 89°27′40″W	Holly Springs vicinity	

== Former listing ==
	Name on the Register	Image	Date listed	Date removed	Location	City or town	Description
1	Malone House		June 28, 1982 (#82003109)	May 25, 1988	197 W. College Ave.	Holly Springs	Demolished in 1988

== See also ==
- List of National Historic Landmarks in Mississippi
- National Register of Historic Places listings in Mississippi
