= Robert Raiford Home and Farm =

Historic house in Mississippi, United States

- U.S. National Register of Historic Places
- U.S. Historic district
- Location within Mississippi Location within the United States
- Nearest city: Victoria, Mississippi
- Area: 160 acres (65 ha)
- Built: 1855
- Architectural style: Greek Revival
- NRHP reference No.: 98001110
- Added to NRHP: August 28, 1998

The Robert Raiford Home and Farm is a historic house in Victoria, Mississippi, U.S. It was built from 1850 to 1855 for Robert Raiford, a farmer. It has been listed on the National Register of Historic Places since August 28, 1998.
