= Myers-Hicks Place =

Historic house in Mississippi, United States

- U.S. National Register of Historic Places
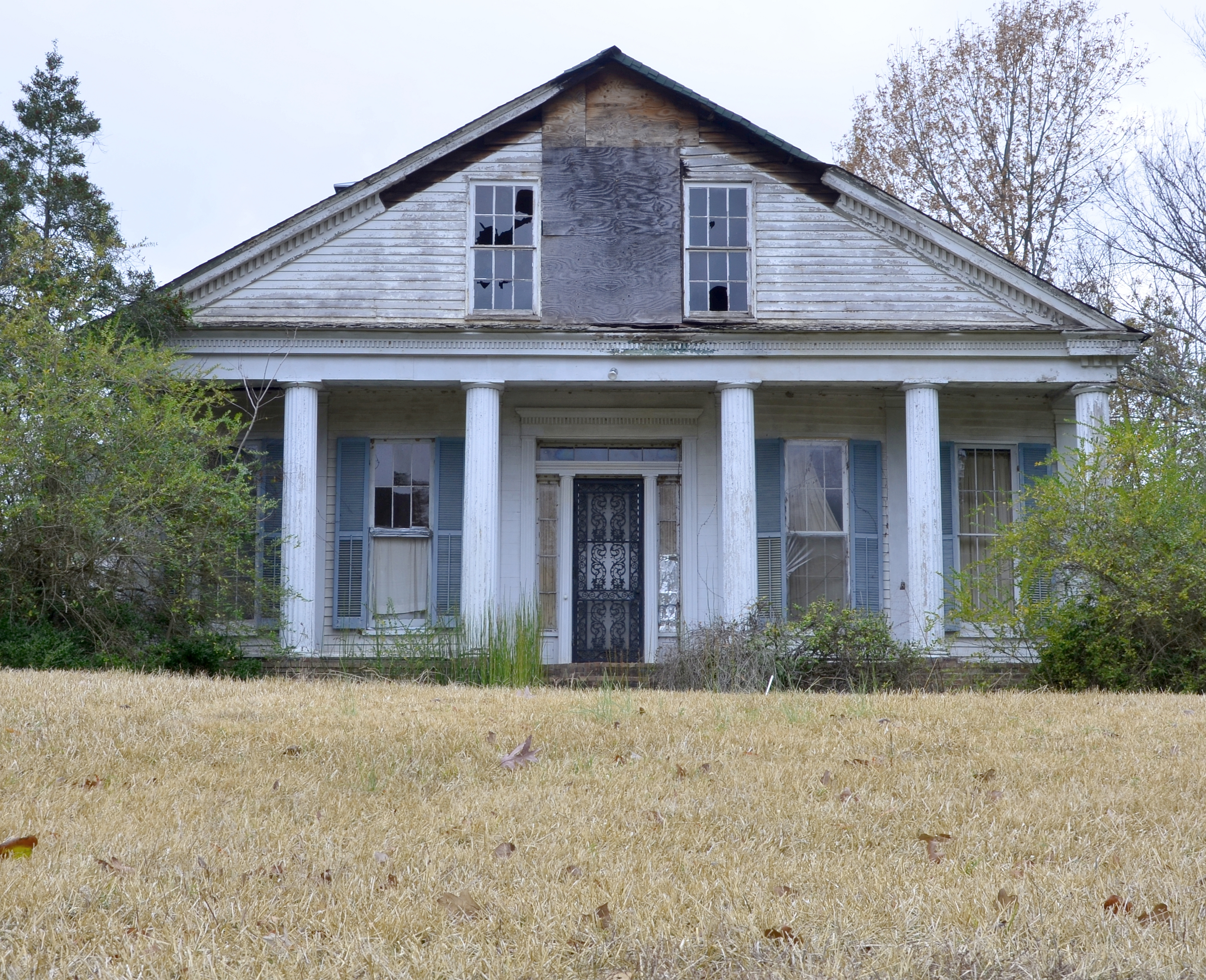
- Myers-Hicks Place in 2014

- Location within Mississippi Location within the United States
- Location: Mississippi Highway 309, Byhalia, Mississippi, U.S.
- Coordinates: 34°49′47″N 89°41′19″W
- Built: 1855
- Architectural style: Greek Revival
- NRHP reference No.: 83000961
- Added to NRHP: March 7, 1983

Myers-Hicks Place, also known as Holly Hill Farm, is a historic Greek Revival house near Byhalia, Mississippi, United States. It is listed on the National Register of Historic Places in Marshall County.

== Location ==
The house is located along Mississippi Highway 309 outside Byhalia, a small town in Marshall County, Mississippi.

== History ==
Martine Pickett Myers acquired the land in 1850. The one-story house was built five years later, in 1855. It was designed as a temple, in the Greek Revival architectural style.

Later, the house belonged to the Hicks family. The house was renamed in honor of their daughter, Annice E. Hicks. They converted a doorway into a window, added a kitchen in 1911, and later added a bathroom.

The house was acquired by Mr and Mrs Henry Hunt III in 1968. It still belonged to them in the 1980s.

== Architectural significance ==
It has been listed on the National Register of Historic Places since March 7, 1983.
