= Victoria, Marshall County, Mississippi =

Victoria, Mississippi
- Census-designated place
- Location within Mississippi Location within the United States
- Coordinates: 34°50′19″N 89°37′35″W
- Country: United States
- State: Mississippi
- County: Marshall

Area
  - Total: 7.37 sq mi (19.08 km^{2})
  - Land: 7.36 sq mi (19.05 km^{2})
  - Water: 0.012 sq mi (0.03 km^{2})
- Elevation: 423 ft (129 m)

Population (2020)
  - Total: 1,066
  - Density: 144.9/sq mi (55.96/km^{2})
- Time zone: UTC-6 (Central (CST))
  - Summer (DST): UTC-5 (CDT)
- ZIP codes: 38679 (PO box); 38611 (Byhalia); 38661 (Red Banks)
- Area code: 662
- GNIS feature ID: 2812736
- FIPS code: 28-76760

Victoria is a census-designated place (CDP) and unincorporated community in Marshall County, Mississippi, United States. Per the 2020 census, the population was 1,066.

== History ==
Victoria is located on the BNSF Railway and was established on January 22, 1886. In 1900, Victoria had a population of 30, a church, and cotton gin.

In 1925, the Sunnyland passenger train derailed and tumbled down an embankment as it approached Victoria, killing 20.

== Geography ==
Victoria is in northwestern Marshall County. Mississippi Highway 178 passes through the community, leading northwest 4 miles (6 km) to Byhalia and southeast 11 miles (18 km) to Holly Springs, the county seat. Interstate 22 passes through the south side of Victoria, with access from Exit 18 (Victoria Road). I-22 leads southeast 70 miles (110 km) to Tupelo and northwest to the Memphis, Tennessee, area. Downtown Memphis is 35 miles (56 km) northwest of Victoria.

According to the U.S. Census Bureau, the Victoria CDP has a total area of 7.37 square miles (19.09 km^{2}), of which 0.01 square miles (0.03 km^{2}), or 0.16%, are water. Barrow Creek passes through the south side of the community, flowing northwest toward Byhalia Creek, a tributary of the Coldwater River and part of the Tallahatchie River watershed.

== Demographics ==
Historical population
Census	Pop.	Note	%±
2020	1,066		—
U.S. Decennial Census; 2020

Victoria was first listed as a census designated place in the 2020 U.S. census.

=== 2020 census ===
Victoria CDP, Mississippi – Racial and ethnic composition Note: the US Census treats Hispanic/Latino as an ethnic category. This table excludes Latinos from the racial categories and assigns them to a separate category. Hispanics/Latinos may be of any race.
Race / Ethnicity (NH = Non-Hispanic)	Pop 2020	% 2020
White alone (NH)	671	62.95%
Black or African American alone (NH)	239	22.42%
Native American or Alaska Native alone (NH)	3	0.28%
Asian alone (NH)	0	0.00%
Pacific Islander alone (NH)	0	0.00%
Some Other Race alone (NH)	2	0.19%
Mixed Race or Multi-Racial (NH)	44	4.13%
Hispanic or Latino (any race)	107	10.04%
Total	1,066	100.00%
