= Summer Trees =

Historic house in Mississippi, United States

- U.S. National Register of Historic Places
- Location: Mayhome Road, Red Banks, Mississippi
- Coordinates: 34.86822°N 89.54849°W
- Architectural style: Greek Revival
- NRHP reference No.: 79001331
- Added to NRHP: January 19, 1979

Summer Trees is a historic mansion near Red Banks, Mississippi.

== Location ==
The mansion is located on Mayhome Road near Red Banks, Mississippi.

== History ==
The mansion was built from 1820 to 1825. It was designed in the Greek Revival architectural style. It was purchased by Washington S. Taylor, the son of Sanders Washington Taylor, in 1851. Taylor sold it to pay off debts in the 1880s.

The mansion was left vacant from 1900 to 1935, until it was purchased by Mr and Mrs Neely Grant. The Grants restored it. In 1969, they sold it to Mr and Mrs Alfred Cowles, Jr.

== Architectural significance ==
It has been listed on the National Register of Historic Places since January 19, 1979.
