= Wilkerson House =

Wilkerson House may refer to:

- Wilkerson House (Evening Shade, Arkansas), listed on the National Register of Historic Places in Sharp County, Arkansas
- Wilkerson House (Holly Springs, Mississippi), listed on the National Register of Historic Places in Marshall County, Mississippi
