= Thistledome =

Historic house in Mississippi, United States

- U.S. Historic district – Contributing property
- Location within Mississippi Location within the United States
- Location: 118 Highway 309 South, Byhalia, Marshall County, Mississippi, U.S.
- Coordinates: 34°52′07.8″N 89°41′20.6″W
- Built: 1840
- Architectural style: Neoclassical
- Part of: Byhalia Historic District (ID96000256)
- Added to NRHP: March 7, 1996

Thistledome, a.k.a. Horn-McAuley House and Chalmers/Horn House is a historic house in Byhalia, Mississippi, USA. Listed on the National Register of Historic Places as part of the Byhalia Historic District, it is the only remaining Antebellum residence in Byhalia.

== Location ==
It is located at 118 Highway 309 South in Byhalia, a small town in Northern Mississippi.

== History ==
The house was built in 1840 by Joseph Chalmers, the District Attorney for Marshall County. He was the father of James Ronald Chalmers and H.H. Chalmers. He was also the Uncle to Jefferson Davis, who mentored with his uncle. It was designed as a two-storey, hip-roofed house.

It was purchased by E. B. Horn in 1900. He paid $10.00 down in December 1899 and remaining balance of $690 on January 1, 1900. Horn turned the house, which was facing East, to face North after his wife refused to live in the house because it faced a hog farm. He also redesigned it in the neoclassical architectural style.

Shortly before World War II, in 1938, the house was purchased by the McAuley family. Mrs. McCauley was asked how she liked the house and her reply was "This will do me". What started as the "this will do me" house became Thistledome."

It was acquired by Jill and Todd Maxwell in 2012. The couple turned it into a restaurant.

== Architectural significance ==
The house is the only house built prior to the American Civil War of 1861-1865 still standing in Byhalia. As a contributing property to the Byhalia Historic District, it has been listed on the National Register of Historic Places since March 7, 1996.
