= Daniel Baker (Presbyterian minister) =

American clergyman

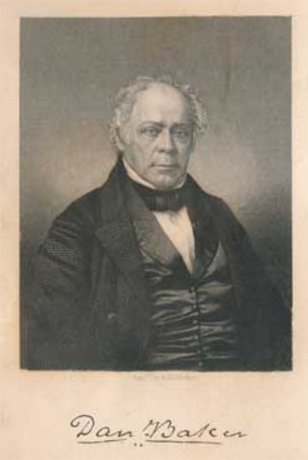
- Born: August 17, 1791; Midway, Georgia, U.S.
- Died: December 10, 1857 (aged 66); Austin, Texas, U.S.
- Education: Hampden–Sydney College; Princeton University
- Occupations: Clergyman, educator
- Spouse: Elizabeth McRobert
- Children: 4, including William Mumford
- Parent: William Baker

Daniel Baker (August 17, 1791 – December 10, 1857) was an American Presbyterian, serving at times as a Pastor, and other times as an Evangelist. He also served as an educator in the Antebellum South. He was the founder of Austin College, and served as its second president from 1853 to 1857.

== Early life ==
Daniel Baker was born on August 17, 1791, in Midway, Georgia. His father was William Baker. His mother died when he was an infant. His father subsequently remarried. He had six siblings.

Baker attended Hampden–Sydney College from 1811 to 1813. However, due to the War of 1812, he transferred to the Princeton University, and graduated in 1815.

== Career ==
Baker started his career as a Presbyterian minister in Harrisonburg and New Erection, Virginia, in 1818. By 1822, he became the minister at Second Presbyterian Church in Washington, D.C. In 1828, he became the minister at Independent Presbyterian Church in Savannah, Georgia. He then preached in Frankfort, Kentucky. In 1831, he preached 10 days of revival services at the Parish Church of St. Helena in Beaufort, South Carolina (Beaufort lacking a Presbyterian congregation), an event now called the "Beaufort Revival." He moved to Tuscaloosa, Alabama, in 1836.

Baker moved to the Republic of Texas in 1840. He preached in Galveston, Houston, and Chriesman. Later, he preached in Victoria, Cuero, Clinton, Goliad, Gonzales, New Braunfels, Bastrop, Wharton, Columbia, Port Lavaca, La Grange, Palestine, Brownsville, Rio Grande City, as well as cities like Austin and San Antonio. In 1848, he became the minister of First Presbyterian Church in Galveston, Texas.

Baker served on the board of trustees of the Chalmers Institute, a boys' school in Holly Springs, Mississippi, where he had served as pastor in the 1840s. He founded Austin College in Huntsville, Texas, in 1850. He hired Samuel McKinney, an Irish-born Presbyterian minister who had founded the Chalmers Institute, as the first president of Austin College from 1850 to 1853. When McKinney resigned, Baker served as its second president from 1853 to 1857.

== Personal life ==
Baker married Elizabeth McRobert on March 28, 1816. His wedding ceremony was conducted by Moses Hoge. Baker and his wife had four children.

== Death and legacy ==
Baker died on December 10, 1857, in Austin, Texas. Daniel Baker College was named in his honor.
