= Mississippi Central Railroad (disambiguation) =

Mississippi Central Railroad is a railroad line from Oxford, Mississippi, to Grand Junction, Tennessee.

Mississippi Central Railroad may also refer to:

- Mississippi Central Railroad (1852–1878), a predecessor to the Illinois Central Railroad;
- Mississippi Central Railroad (1904–1967), another line purchased by the Illinois Central Railroad in 1967.
