= McElwain =

McElwain or McElwaine is a surname of Gaelic origin. It can be derived from either Scottish or Irish. The Scottish translation being the anglicized form of Gaelic Mac Gille Bheathain, meaning ‘son of the servant of (Saint) Beathan’ and also a personal name representing a diminutive of beatha ‘life’. The Irish form being the anglicised form of Gaelic Mac Giolla Bháin, meaning ‘son of the white-haired (i.e. ‘ash blond’) lad’. In Ulster this surname can be derived to be the Scottish form as opposed to the Irish form which would be more common in the Republic of Ireland. Another anglicised version of the Irish "Mac Giolla Bháin" is the surname Kilbane.

It may refer to:

- Bill McElwain (1903–1996), American football player and coach of football and basketball
- Frank McElwain (1875–1957), Bishop of Minnesota in the Episcopal Church
- Guy McElwaine (1936–2008), American baseball player, Hollywood agent, producer and studio head
- Jason McElwain (born 1987), American basketball player
- Jim McElwain (born 1962), American football coach
- John A. McElwain (1794–1875), New York politician
- Percy McElwaine (1884–1969), Irish officer
- Philip McElwaine (born 1957), Australian boxer
- Séamus McElwaine (1960–1986), IRA member
- Wade McElwain (born 1972), Canadian comedian
- Wallace S. McElwain (1832–1882), American businessman
