= Oakdale, Illinois =

Oakdale
- Village
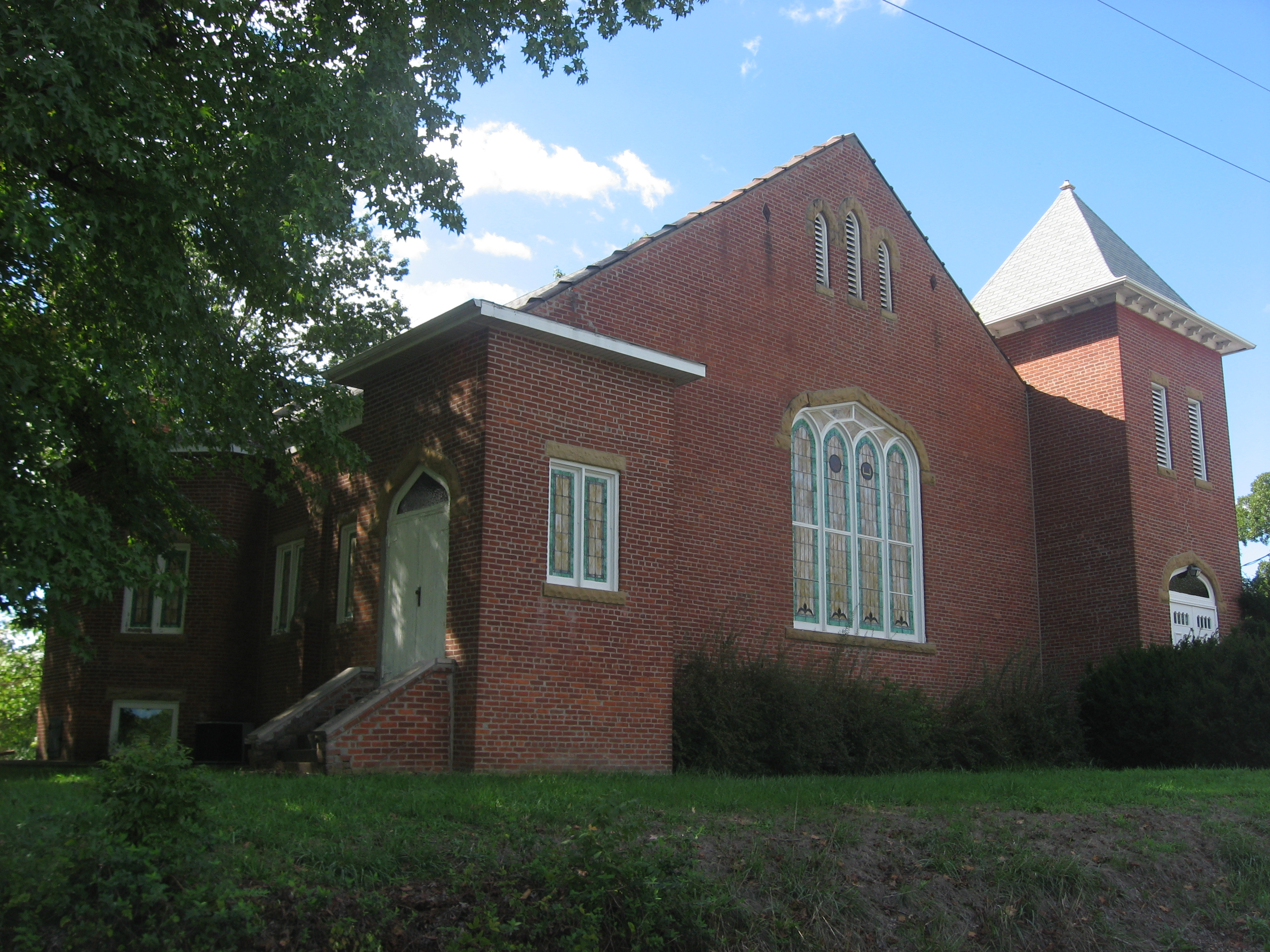
- Oakdale's former Reformed Presbyterian church

- Location of Oakdale in Washington County, Illinois.
- Coordinates: 38°15′54″N 89°29′58″W
- Country: United States
- State: Illinois
- County: Washington

Area
  - Total: 1.58 sq mi (4.10 km^{2})
  - Land: 1.58 sq mi (4.10 km^{2})
  - Water: 0 sq mi (0.00 km^{2})
- Elevation: 518 ft (158 m)

Population (2020)
  - Total: 199
  - Density: 125.8/sq mi (48.57/km^{2})
- Time zone: UTC-6 (CST)
  - Summer (DST): UTC-5 (CDT)
- ZIP code: 62268
- Area code: 618
- FIPS code: 17-54586
- GNIS ID: 2399540

Oakdale is a village in Washington County, Illinois, United States. As of the 2020 census, Oakdale had a population of 199.

== Geography ==
According to the 2010 census, Oakdale has a total area of 1.64 square miles (4.25 km^{2}), all land.

== Demographics ==
Historical population
Census	Pop.	Note	%±
1870	116		—
1880	131		12.9%
1980	198		—
1990	179		−9.6%
2000	213		19.0%
2010	221		3.8%
2020	199		−10.0%
U.S. Decennial Census

As of the census of 2000, there were 213 people, 85 households, and 62 families residing in the village. The population density was 128.3 inhabitants per square mile (49.5/km^{2}). There were 92 housing units at an average density of 55.4 per square mile (21.4/km^{2}). The racial makeup of the village was 96.71% White, 0.47% Native American, and 2.82% from two or more races.

There were 85 households, out of which 34.1% had children under the age of 18 living with them, 64.7% were married couples living together, 5.9% had a female householder with no husband present, and 25.9% were non-families. 25.9% of all households were made up of individuals, and 12.9% had someone living alone who was 65 years of age or older. The average household size was 2.51 and the average family size was 2.95.

In the village, the population was spread out, with 26.3% under the age of 18, 7.5% from 18 to 24, 27.7% from 25 to 44, 23.9% from 45 to 64, and 14.6% who were 65 years of age or older. The median age was 37 years. For every 100 females, there were 91.9 males. For every 100 females age 18 and over, there were 91.5 males.

The median income for a household in the village was $40,938, and the median income for a family was $45,000. Males had a median income of $40,179 versus $31,250 for females. The per capita income for the village was $18,651. About 4.7% of families and 3.0% of the population were below the poverty line, including 4.2% of those under the age of eighteen and none of those 65 or over.

== Notable people ==
- Samuel McKinney, Reformed Presbyterian minister
