= Redmont Railway =

Overview
- Headquarters: Red Bay, Alabama
- Reporting mark: RRC
- Locale: Mississippi
- Dates of operation: 1995–2013
- Predecessor: Illinois Central Railroad Norfolk Southern Corp 1988-1995

Technical
- Track gauge: 4 ft 8 1/2 in (1,435 mm) standard gauge
- Length: 41.5 miles (66.8 km)

The Redmont Railway (reporting mark RRC) operated a 41.5-mile (66.8 km) segment of railroad that was leased from the Mississippi-Alabama Railroad Authority and operated by Sunshine Mills. The line runs between Corinth, Mississippi, and Red Bay, Alabama. Primary products hauled included grain and pet food products, recreational vehicle frames, and completed recreational vehicles. RRC interchanged with Norfolk Southern in Corinth.

In September 2013, the line was purchased by Mississippi Central and is now operated as the Redmont Division of the Mississippi Central .
