= William Mumford Baker =

Presbyterian minister and an author

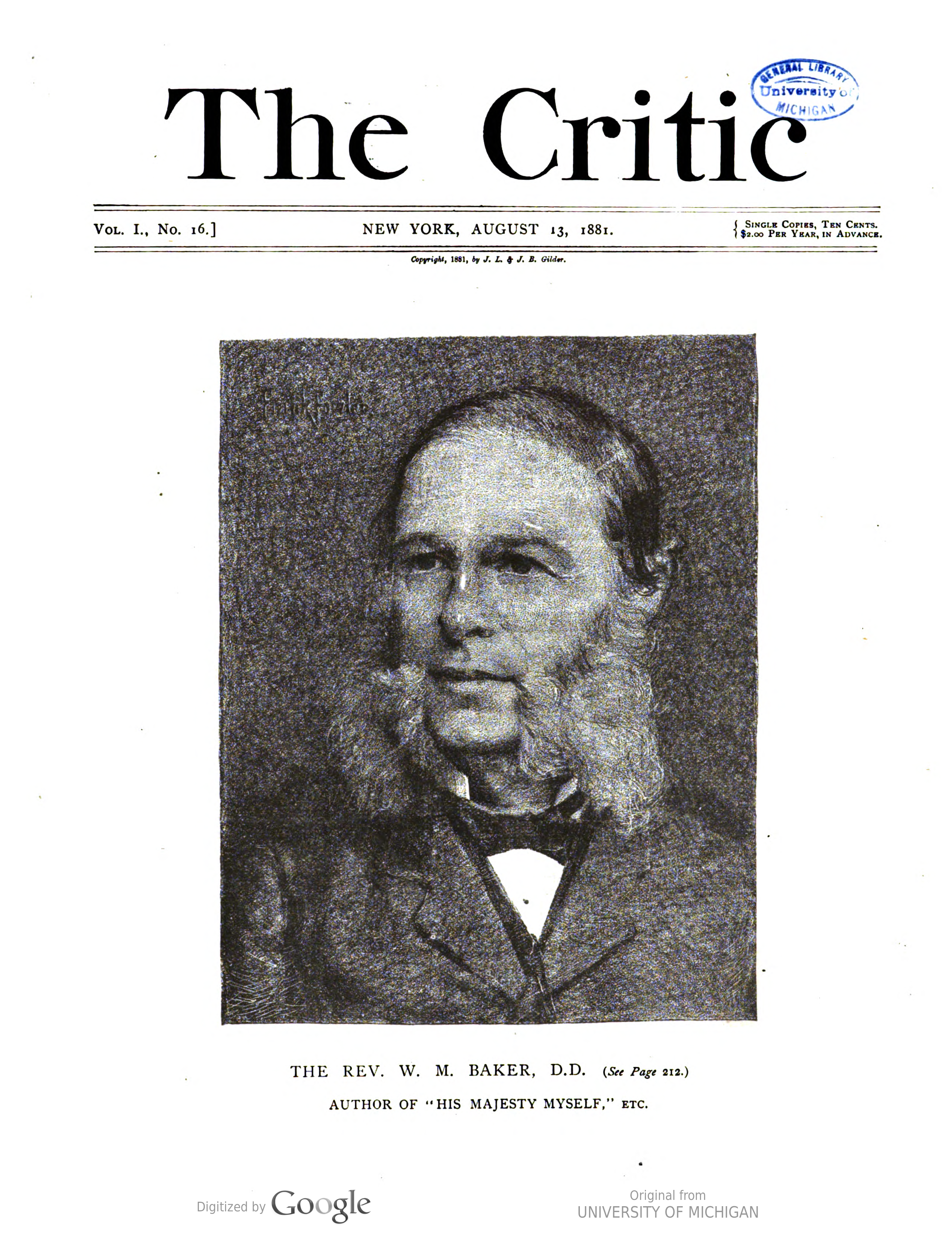
William Mumford Baker on the cover of The Critic, 1881, v.1 January–December

William Mumford Baker (June 6, 1825 – 1883) was a Presbyterian minister and an author.

Born in Washington D.C., he was the son of clergyman Daniel Baker. He graduated from Princeton College in 1846 and Princeton Seminary in 1848.

Ordained an evangelist by the Presbytery of Little Rock on April 22, 1849, he went on to serve in Galveston, Texas and after the American Civil War in Ohio and Massachusetts.

He wrote twelve novels, many drawing from his experiences in Texas. Baker wrote A Chronicle of Succession published in 1866 under the pen name G. F. Harrington. It was illustrated by Thomas Nast.

== Writings ==
- The Life and Labours of the Reverend Daniel Baker (1858)
- A Chronicle of Secession (1866) using the pen name G. F. Harrington
- Oak Mot (1868)
- Mose Evans (1874)
- Carter Quarterman (1876)
- A year Worth Living (1878)
- Colonel Dunwoodie (1878)
- The Virginians in Texas (1878)
- Thirlmore (1879)
- The New Timothy (1879)
- His Majesty, Myself (1879)
- Blessed Saint Certainty (1881)
- The Ten Theophanies: or, the Manifestations of Christ before His Birth in Bethlehem (1883)
- The Making of a Man (1884)
