= Samuel McKinney =

American Presbyterian minister (1807–1879)

- Born: March 19, 1807; County Antrim, Ireland
- Died: November 27, 1879 (aged 72); Huntsville, Texas, U.S.
- Education: University of Pennsylvania
- Occupations: Clergyman, educator
- Spouse: Nancy Woodside Todd
- Children: 5
- Parent(s): Samuel McKinney; Margaret Findley

Samuel McKinney (1807–1879) was an Irish-born Presbyterian minister and educator in the American South, particularly Tennessee, Mississippi, and Texas. He founded the Chalmers Institute in Holly Springs, Mississippi, in 1850. He served as the founding president of Austin College in Huntsville, Texas, from 1850 to 1853, and again from 1862 to 1871.

== Early life and family ==
Samuel McKinney was born on March 19, 1807, in County Antrim, Ireland. His father was Samuel McKinney and his mother, Margaret Findley. He emigrated to the United States with his parents in 1812, settling in Philadelphia, but his youth was spent on a farm in Hawkins County, Tennessee.

McKinney married Nancy Woodside Todd on July 4, 1836. They had five children.

== Career ==
McKinney graduated from the University of Pennsylvania in 1832, where he received a degree in Theology, and also studied theology at the Reformed Presbyterian Theological Seminary. Licensed in 1832, he preached at scattered congregations before his ordination in 1835 and installation as the pastor of the Elkhorn Reformed Presbyterian Church in Oakdale, Illinois. During this pastorate, which concluded with his resignation in 1840, he also converted many Native Americans. He joined the Presbyterian Church in 1844.

Upon resigning his Oakdale pastorate, McKinney returned to Tennessee in 1840, first to preach in Shelby County and later to teach in Madison County. He taught at the Denmark Academy in Denmark. Later, he served as the president of the West Jackson College (a precursor to Union University) in Jackson.

McKinney founded Chalmers Institute, a boys' school in Holly Springs, Mississippi, in 1850. During that time, he met Daniel Baker, a Presbyterian minister who served on its Board of Trustees. When Baker founded Austin College in Huntsville, Texas, in 1850, he hired McKinney as its first president until 1853. Though both men were initially on good terms, McKinney resigned due to a personal disagreement with Sam Houston. In any case, McKinney returned to Mississippi. However, during the American Civil War in 1862 McKinney returned to serve as president a second time until 1871.

== Death ==
McKinney died of dysentery on November 27, 1879. He is buried at Oakwood Cemetery in Huntsville, Texas.
