= George Yarbrough =

American newspaper owner and politician (1916–1988)

George M. Yarbrough (August 15, 1916 – November 27, 1988) was a newspaper owner and state legislator in Mississippi. He served in the Mississippi House of Representatives and Mississippi Senate.

He was born in Red Banks, Mississippi. He achieved the rank of master sergeant in the U.S. Army during World War II. In 1958. He acquired The South Reporter and became its editor.

He was elected to the Mississippi House in 1952 and to the Mississippi Senate in 1956, serving there until 1968. After leaving office he was re-elected to the state senate in 1972 and served there until 1980 when he lost re-election. He served as President Pro Tempore of the Mississippi Senate from 1960 to 1968 and served as acting Lieutenant Governor from 1966 to 1968.

Yarbrough was a Citizens Council member and on the Executive Committee of the Citizens Councils. Yarbrough served on the committees overseeing the federal Agricultural Stabilization and Conservation Service (ASCS) program. He organized an investigation of voter drive registration efforts that included African Americans .

Yarbrough ordered Mississippi Highway Patrol officers off the University of Mississippi campus while acting as the governor's representative during the 1962 protests over James Meredith's federal court ordered admittance to the whites only school. In 1958, he sponsored an anti-NAACP resolution.
