= Confederate Armory Site =

- U.S. National Register of Historic Places
- Location within Mississippi Location within the United States
- Location: Holly Springs, Mississippi, U.S.
- Coordinates: 34°46′43.5″N 89°26′5.5″W
- Area: area = 32 acres (13 ha)
- Built: 1859
- NRHP reference No.: 72000699
- Added to NRHP: April 11, 1972

The Confederate Armory Site, a.k.a. Jones, McElwain and Company Iron Foundry, is a historic site in Holly Springs, Mississippi, US. It contains the scant ruins of the foundry built there in 1859, converted to an armory in 1861 by the Confederate States Army, used as a hospital by the Union Army in November 1862, and razed by the Confederates a month later.

== History ==
Located in Holly Springs, the county seat of Marshall County, in Northern Mississippi the foundry was established in 1859 as the headquarters of the Jones, McElwain and Company Iron Foundry. The railings the business produced can be seen at the Hillcrest Cemetery in Holly Springs as well as in New Orleans, Louisiana. The foundry also made iron used on slave plantations. The headquarters included several buildings and outbuildings, a foundry chimney, and ponds used as a water source for the foundry.

In 1861, at the outset of the American Civil War which lasted until 1865, Wallace S. McElwain turned the foundry into an armory for the Confederate States Army. The foundry was commissioned by the government of the Confederate States of America to make 20,000 U.S. Model 1841-designed rifles and 10,000 U.S. Model 1842-designed muskets. They were also commissioned to make 5,000 rifles for the state of Mississippi. No arms bearing the marks of the foundry have been found, it is therefore believed that the foundry was able only to repair and convert existing arms before it was in danger of being overrun after the Battle of Shiloh. The equipment was moved to Macon, Georgia and the weapons on hand were sent to Grenada, Mississippi.

On November 13, 1862, the Union Army invaded Holly Springs, and Union Major Horace R. Witz turned the armory into a hospital for Northern soldiers. It was also used as a storage facility for medical supplies used by Northerners. However, on December 20, 1862, Confederate General Earl Van Dorn burned down the site.

The site remained untouched until 1971.

== Heritage significance ==
It has been listed on the National Register of Historic Places since April 11, 1972.
