= Chalmers Institute =

Historic building in Mississippi, United States

- U.S. National Register of Historic Places
- Location within Mississippi Location within the United States
- Location: West Chulahoma Avenue, Holly Springs, Marshall County, Mississippi, U.S.
- Coordinates: 34°46′1″N 89°27′25″W
- Area: 2 acres (0.81 ha)
- Built: 1837
- Architectural style: Federal
- MPS: Holly Springs MRA
- NRHP reference No.: 82003107
- Added to NRHP: June 28, 1982

The Chalmers Institute is a historic building in Holly Springs, Mississippi, U.S. Built in 1837, it was home to the University of Holly Springs, the oldest university in Mississippi, from 1838 to 1839. It was home to a short-lived Methodist medical and law school from 1839 to 1843. It reopened as the Chalmers Institute, a Presbyterian boys' school, from 1850 to 1878, when a yellow fever epidemic closed down the school. It became home to the Holly Springs Normal Institute in 1879, but closed down a few years later. In the twentieth century, it became a private residence. It has been listed by the National Register of Historic Places for its historic significance since 1982.

== Location ==
The building is located on West Chulahoma Avenue in Holly Springs, a small town in Marshall County, Mississippi, in the American South.

== History ==
The building was erected in 1837. It was designed as a hip-roofed two-storey building in the Federal architectural style. It was known as the Holly Springs Literary Institution in 1837. By 1838, it became known as the University of Holly Springs. As such, it was the first university in Mississippi, nine years before the foundation of the University of Mississippi in Oxford, Mississippi. However, it closed down shortly after, in 1843.

The building was home to a medical and law school run by the Methodist Episcopal Church, South from 1839 to 1843. It closed down in 1843 and remained unoccupied until 1847.

In 1847, Reverend Samuel McKinney, an Irish-born Presbyterian minister, opened the Chalmers Institute, a boys' school. Prominent former students included George Clifton Myers (1852–1934), an influential clerk of the Mississippi Supreme Court, and Confederate Colonel William F. Taylor, who became a prosperous cotton commissioner in the post-bellum South. One of the trustees was Reverend Daniel Baker, a Presbyterian minister who went on to found Daniel Baker College and Austin College in Texas. Meanwhile, McKinney went on to serve as the first President of Austin College.

In the aftermath of the American Civil War, the school reopened under the leadership of Professor W. A. Anderson until 1869. It thrived until 1878, when Holly Springs was hit by an epidemic of yellow fever. A year later, another school opened in the building: the Holly Springs Normal Institute. However, it later closed down in 1879.

The building became a private residence at the outset of the twentieth century. In 2009, it was acquired by Preserve Marshall County/Holly Springs Inc., a preservationist organization whose aim is to save and restore the building. In 2013, they received US$80,000 (~$105,924 in 2024) from the Mississippi Department of Archives and History to replace the roof.

== Architectural significance ==
The building has been listed on the National Register of Historic Places since June 28, 1982. It is also a Mississippi Landmark. The structure was most likely built by the architect Joseph Coe, who created other buildings in the town, including the Marshall County Courthouse and Federal buildings.
