= Wallace S. McElwain =

Wallace S. McElwain (1832–1882) was an American businessman.

== Early life ==
Wallace Scott McElwain was born in 1832. He was trained in a gun factory in New York and in a foundry in Ohio.

== Career ==
McElwain co-founded the Jones, McElwain and Company Iron Foundry in Holly Springs, Mississippi. Some of their railings in the Hillcrest Cemetery are listed on the National Register of Historic Places. Many railings are also present in New Orleans, Louisiana.

During the Civil War, he made guns for the Confederate States Army.

== Death ==
McElwain died in 1882.
