= Kate Freeman Clark =

American painter (1875–1957)

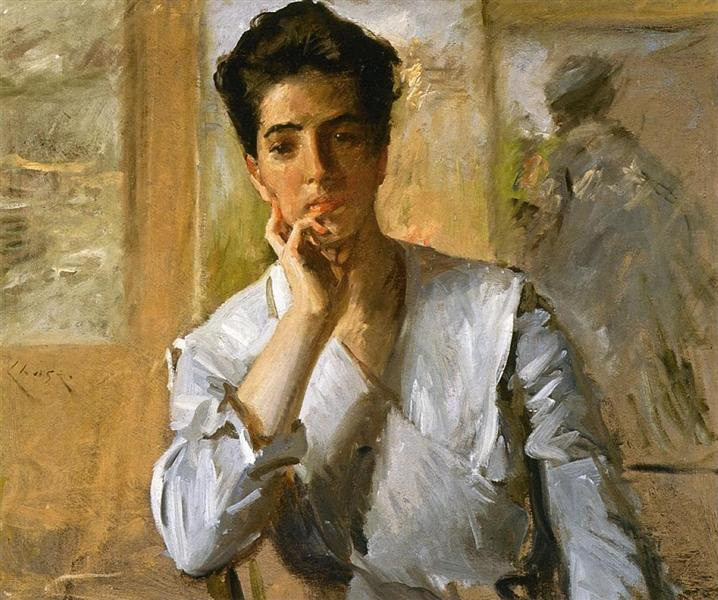
- Portrait of Kate Freeman Clark by William Merritt Chase, 1902
- Born: September 3, 1875; Holly Springs, Mississippi, US
- Died: March 3, 1957 (aged 81)
- Known for: Painting

Kate Freeman Clark (September 3, 1875 – March 3, 1957) was an American painter born in Holly Springs, Mississippi.

Clark was the daughter of Edward Clark, an attorney in Vicksburg, Mississippi, and Cary Freeman Clark, whose great-uncle was Edward Cary Walthall. An only child, she was named for her grandmother, and was called "Little Kate" to distinguish her from "Mama Kate". Soon after her birth her father purchased a plantation which would later become the centerpiece of the town of Cary, named for his wife. Kate and her mother summered in Holly Springs, where the air was considered cleaner than along the Mississippi Delta, and Edward would write his daughter long letters during these absences.

Edward Clark died of pneumonia in 1885, soon after being named assistant to L. Q. C. Lamar, Edward Walthall's former law partner who had been named Grover Cleveland's Secretary of the Interior. At his death Kate and her mother moved to Freeman Place in Holly Springs, which had been the Walthall family residence. The family soon moved to New York City, where Kate attended finishing school at the Gardiner School, from which she graduated in 1891. In 1893 the two went to the World's Columbian Exposition in Chicago, which fired in the young woman a passion for art. Upon returning to New York City, she enrolled in the Art Students League in 1894; there she studied drawing with John Henry Twachtman and watercolor with Irving Ramsay Wiles.

It was Wiles who introduced her to William Merritt Chase, who would teach her still-life and plein air painting and would serve as her mentor until his death in 1916. The tidy watercolor medium was often used by women at the era, but upon witnessing Chase paint in oil while outfitted in a white flannel suit, Clark took up his favored medium. Chase respected her work highly, choosing two of her paintings for his personal collection. Clark and her mother summered on eastern Long Island during the late 1890s; Cary also traveled to Washington, D.C. for the social season there in 1896, in which year Kate attended classes at the Corcoran School of Art. She also attended the New York School of Art and the Shinnecock School of Art; she would remain in New York for the winters while traveling to resort areas in Vermont and Connecticut in summers.

Clark took to signing her works with "Freeman Clark" or "K. Freeman Clark" so that her gender was not immediately apparent. She began exhibiting, showing her work at the National Academy of Design in 1905. Further exhibitions followed, at the Carnegie Institute in Pittsburgh, the Corcoran Gallery of Art in Washington, D.C., the Pennsylvania Academy of the Fine Arts in Philadelphia, and at the National Academy and Society of American Artists in New York. She was the subject of a number of one-woman shows, and spoke to the Macbeth Gallery to discuss selling her paintings through them.

Clark had returned to Mississippi sporadically over her career to attend to family obligations, but she spent the bulk of her artistic life in New York; only two paintings on Mississippi subjects are known to exist. However, in 1924, after over 20 years in New York Clark returned to Mississippi and her southern roots, leaving the art world behind forever. Her reasons are unknown, but it has been speculated that the death of her mentor Chase in 1916, followed by that of her grandmother in 1919 and her mother in 1922, was a blow from which she never recovered. Chase's death especially seems to have hit her hard; she was pained that she could not attend the auction of his studio effects in time to purchase some memento of him, most especially an old, black kettle which he had painted numerous times and which was sold for seven dollars to somebody else. Clark also appears to have foreseen the rise in modernism which followed the Armory Show. Her family is known to have been against her career, and warned her against operating, as her uncle Russell Freeman wrote her, "in spheres of life which belong to men". Her temperament has been described as "depressive", which may have contributed to her withdrawal from the art world.

Clark never married; her one serious suitor, Hamilton Foley, was a West Point cadet who went to the Philippines during the Spanish–American War and was court-martialed for embezzlement in 1905. She rarely spoke of her artwork upon her return to Holly Springs. At her death, however, she bequeathed over 1000 paintings and drawings, which had been held in storage in the Lincoln Warehouse in New York, to the town, along with her house and with money to build a museum to house the art. These works provided the backbone for the Kate Freeman Clark Museum in Holly Springs. The museum, which apart from a handful of pieces by Chase contains only her work, is located next to her former home, and with more than 1,000 of her paintings is believed to be the largest collection of paintings by a single artist anywhere in the world. She had envisioned library space and a room for the display of fashions in the museum as well, but these could not be included in the final design due to a lack of funds.

Clark is buried at Hillcrest Cemetery in Holly Springs.

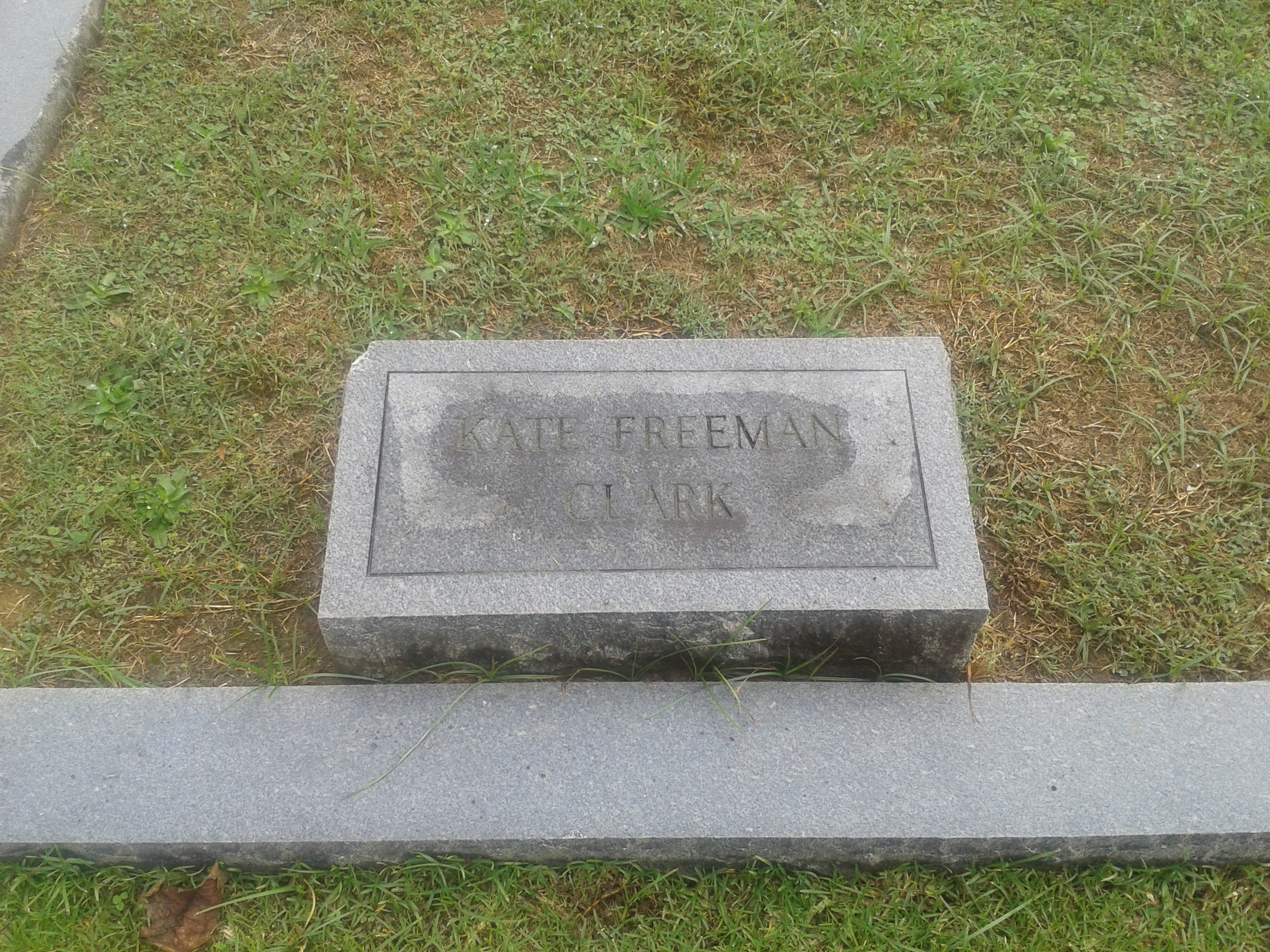
Clark's grave in the family plot in Holly Springs

== Collections ==
Clark's paintings can be found in:

- Greenville County Museum of Art, Greenville, South Carolina
- The Johnson Collection, Spartanburg, South Carolina
- Kate Freeman Clark Art Gallery, Holly Springs, Mississippi
- Memphis Brooks Museum of Art, Memphis, Tennessee
- Private collections
