= Old Water and Electric Light Plant =

- U.S. National Register of Historic Places
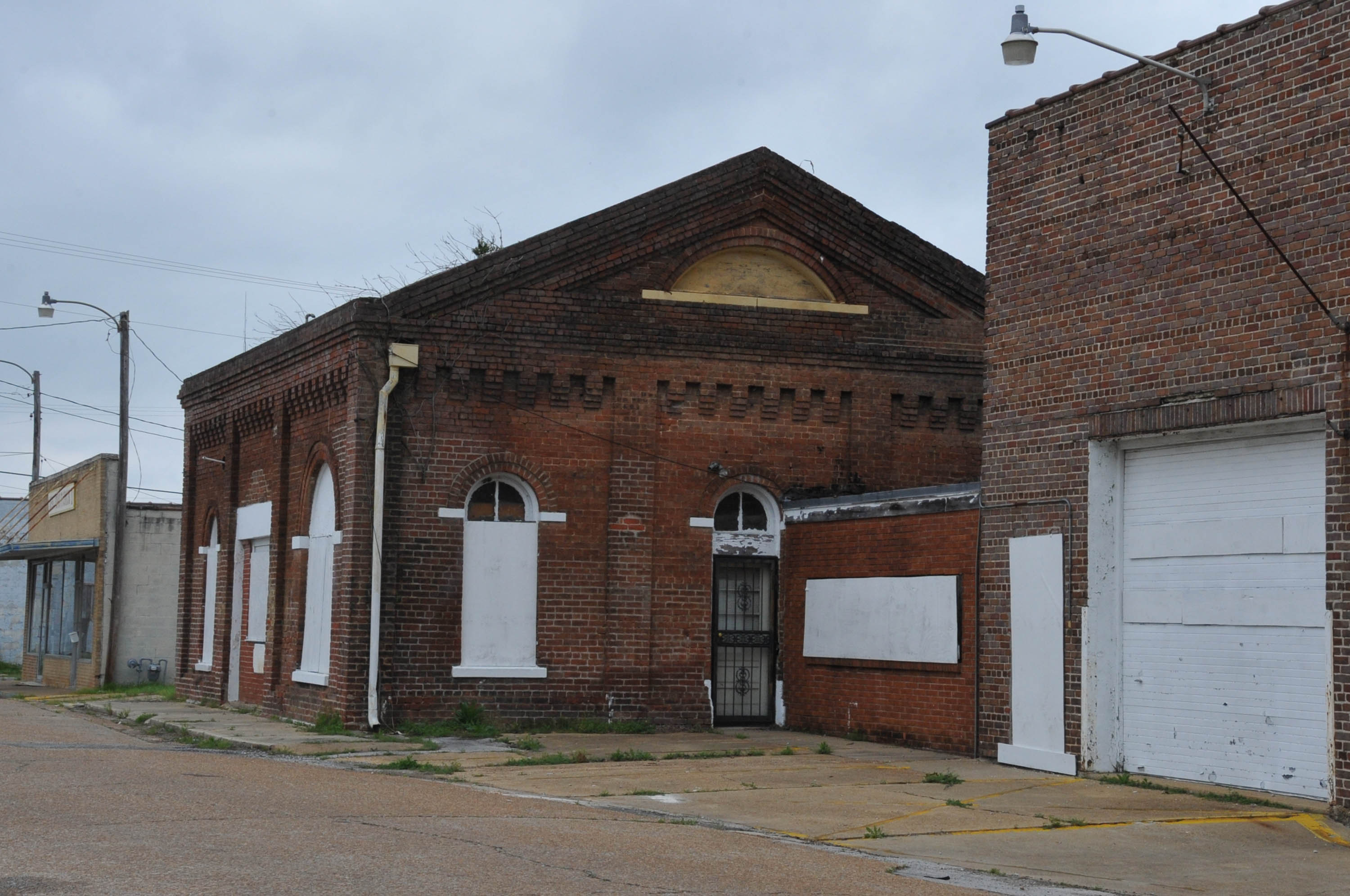
- The Old Water and Electric Light Plant in 2008

- Location within Mississippi Location within the United States
- Location: 140 East Falconer Avenue, Holly Springs, Mississippi
- Coordinates: 34°46′9″N 89°26′50″W
- Area: 0.1 acres (0.040 ha)
- Built: 1898
- MPS: Holly Springs MRA
- NRHP reference No.: 82003111
- Added to NRHP: June 28, 1982

The Old Water and Electric Light Plant, (later known as the Holly Springs Police Department), is a historic building in Holly Springs, Mississippi, U.S.. It was built from 1897 to 1898, with the aim of attracting more businesses to Holly Springs. By 1899, after water pipes had been laid out, 100 houses in Holly Springs had running water. The building was later used as the police department headquarters in Holly Springs. It has been listed on the National Register of Historic Places since June 28, 1982.
