= Dr. Isham G. Bailey House =

Historic house in Mississippi, United States

- U.S. National Register of Historic Places
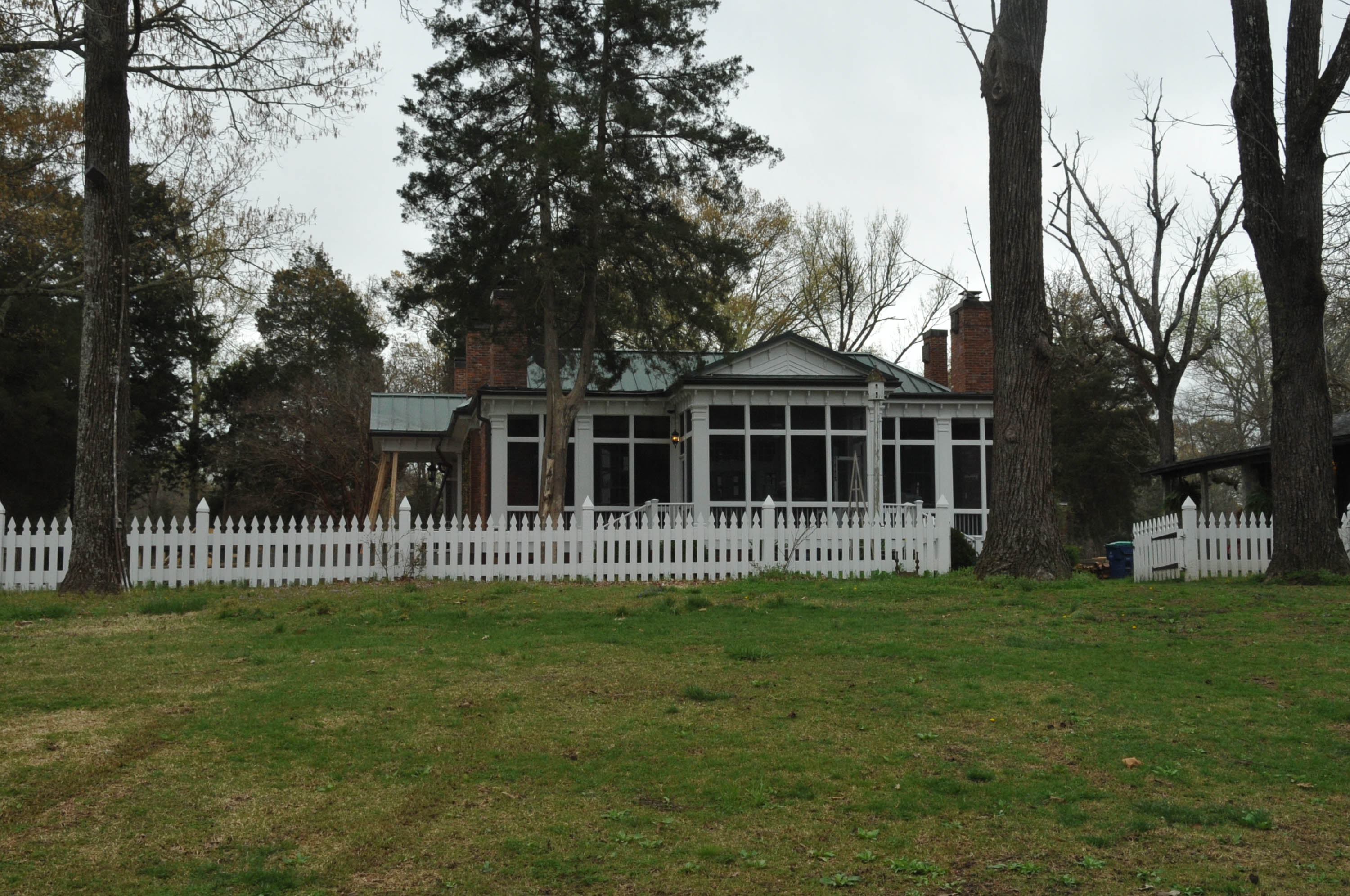
- Dr. Isham G. Bailey House in 2008

- Location within Mississippi Location within the United States
- Location: 1577 Early Grove Road, Lamar, Marshall County, Mississippi, U.S.
- Coordinates: 34.9863°N 89.3781°W
- Area: 8.8 acres (3.6 ha)
- Built: 1842-1855
- Architectural style: Greek Revival, Italianate
- NRHP reference No.: 01000919
- Added to NRHP: August 30, 2001

Dr. Isham G. Bailey House, also known as Cedar Lane Farm, is a historic cottage in Lamar, Mississippi, United States.

== Location ==
The house is located at 1577 Early Grove Road in Lamar, a small town in Marshall County, Mississippi. It is surrounded by 844 acres of land on the property, including some acres in Fayette County, Tennessee, an adjacent county.

== History ==
The land upon which the house was built originally belonged to the Chickasaw Nation. In the 1830s, it was acquired by two land speculators, Thomas Mull and Samuel Reeves.

By the early 1840s, the two speculators sold it to Isham G. Bailey (1813–1885), a "prominent doctor and planter" from Lincoln County, Tennessee. The house was built for Bailey from 1842 to 1855. However, some sources suggest the speculators may have sold the land to a first owner in the 1840s, who built the house in 1842 and sold it to Bailey in the 1850s. Either way, the house was designed as a hip roofed cottage in the Greek Revival and Italianate architectural styles.

Bailey lived in the house with his wife, Susan Bird Bailey (1822-1864), their two sons, Neal T. Bailey and Cullen R. Bailey, and two daughters, Elizabeth and Nancy. Bailey also owned African slaves, who are buried in Bailey Cemetery. After the American Civil War, Bailey's slaves became sharecroppers on the property.

When Bailey died in 1885, the house was inherited by his brother-in-law William M. Parr, husband of Bailey's sister Louisa (1832-1892). Later, it was inherited by their daughter, Jennie Parr, and their granddaughter, Mrs Boyd Burnette. The house was used as a summer retreat owned by the Bailey family until 1985.

The house was acquired by James K. Dobbs, III in 1985. Dobbs remodelled the house.

== Architectural significance ==
The house has been listed on the National Register of Historic Places since August 30, 2001.
