= Winfield S. Featherston =

American politician (1820–1891)

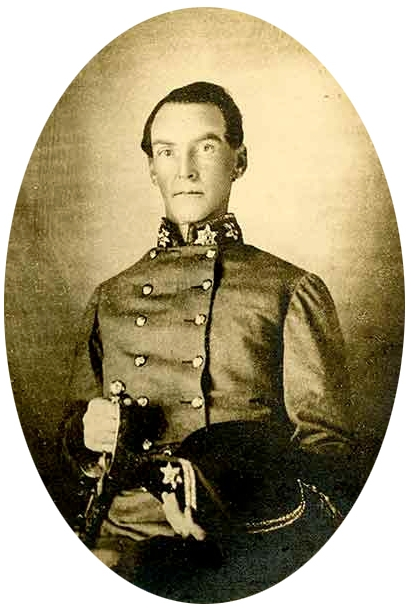
- Featherston in uniform, c. 1861

Member of the U.S. House of Representatives from Mississippi's 2nd district
- In office March 4, 1847 – March 3, 1851
- Preceded by: Established
- Succeeded by: John Allen Wilcox

Personal details
- Born: August 8, 1820 Murfreesboro, Tennessee, U.S.
- Died: May 28, 1891 (aged 70) Holly Springs, Mississippi, U.S.
- Resting place: Hillcrest Cemetery
- Party: Democratic
- Spouse: Elizabeth McEwen
- Occupation: Lawyer, politician, judge
- Nickname: "Old Swet"

Military service
- Allegiance: Confederate States
- Service: Confederate States Army
- Years of service: 1861-1865
- Rank: Brigadier General
- Battles/wars: American Civil War: First Battle of Manassas; Battle of Ball's Bluff; Peninsula Campaign; Second Battle of Manassas; Battle of Antietam; Battle of Fredericksburg; Vicksburg Campaign; Atlanta campaign; Carolinas campaign

Winfield Scott Featherston "Old Swet" (August 8, 1820 – May 28, 1891) was an antebellum two-term U.S. Representative from Mississippi and a brigadier general in the Confederate States Army during the American Civil War. He was later a state politician and a circuit court judge.

== Early life and career ==
Winfield Scott Featherston was born near Murfreesboro, Tennessee on August 8, 1820. He was the youngest of seven children of Charles and Lucy Featherston, who had recently emigrated from Virginia. Featherston completed his preparatory studies, but left high school in 1836 to enroll in a local militia group to fight Creek Indians during the Creek War. He later moved to Mississippi and settled in Houston, where he studied law. He was admitted to the bar in 1840 and established a successful law practice.

Featherston was elected as a Democrat to the Thirtieth and Thirty-first Congresses (March 4, 1847 – March 3, 1851). He was an unsuccessful candidate for reelection in 1850 to the Thirty-second Congress, being defeated by John Allen Wilcox. He returned home to Houston and resumed his law practice.

He moved to Holly Springs, Mississippi, in 1856 and began a new law practice in that town. Two years later, he married Elizabeth McEwen, the daughter of the town's leading merchant. The couple would raise a large family in Holly Springs.

== American Civil War ==
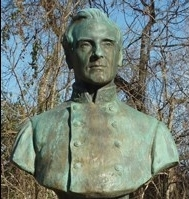
Bust of Featherston by Edmond Thomas Quinn at Vicksburg National Military Park.

With the secession of Mississippi, Featherston was appointed to visit neutral Kentucky to try to influence Governor Beriah Magoffin into also leading his state from the Union. With the start of the Civil War in May 1861, Featherston was appointed a captain of Confederate States Army infantry. He soon raised a regiment of infantry (17th Mississippi Infantry Regiment) and became its colonel on June 4, 1861. He fought at the First Battle of Manassas. He was cited for gallantry at the Battle of Ball's Bluff. He was commissioned as a brigadier general to rank from March 4, 1862. He led a brigade in the Army of Northern Virginia during the Peninsula Campaign and was wounded during the Seven Days Battles at the Battle of Glendale. He then participated in the fighting at the Second Battle of Manassas, as well as at Antietam and Fredericksburg. He was among a number of generals that General Robert E. Lee removed from command or reassigned when he reorganized his army, along with Nathan G. Evans, Thomas F. Drayton, Roger Pryor, and several others. Featherston asked to be returned to his home state because of the growing Union Army threat there.

Transferred to Mississippi in early 1863, Featherston assumed command of a brigade of Mississippians in Major General William W. Loring's Division in the army of General Joseph E. Johnston. Featherston's brigade was at the Battle of Champion Hill. As with the rest of Loring's division, which had marched off on its own to join Joseph E. Johnston in Jackson rather than retreat towards Vicksburg. Consequently it was not with Lieutenant General John C. Pemberton's main force at Vicksburg and was not surrendered with it. Besides the Vicksburg Campaign, Featherston fought in other major campaigns in the Western Theater of the American Civil War, including the Atlanta campaign in 1864. Loring's men accompanied the Army of Tennessee during John Bell Hood's Franklin–Nashville Campaign, or Tennessee Campaign.

In the last weeks of the war in April 1865, Featherston commanded a brigade in the Carolinas campaign and surrendered with Johnston's army in North Carolina. He was paroled in Greensboro, North Carolina, on May 1, 1865.

== Postbellum career ==
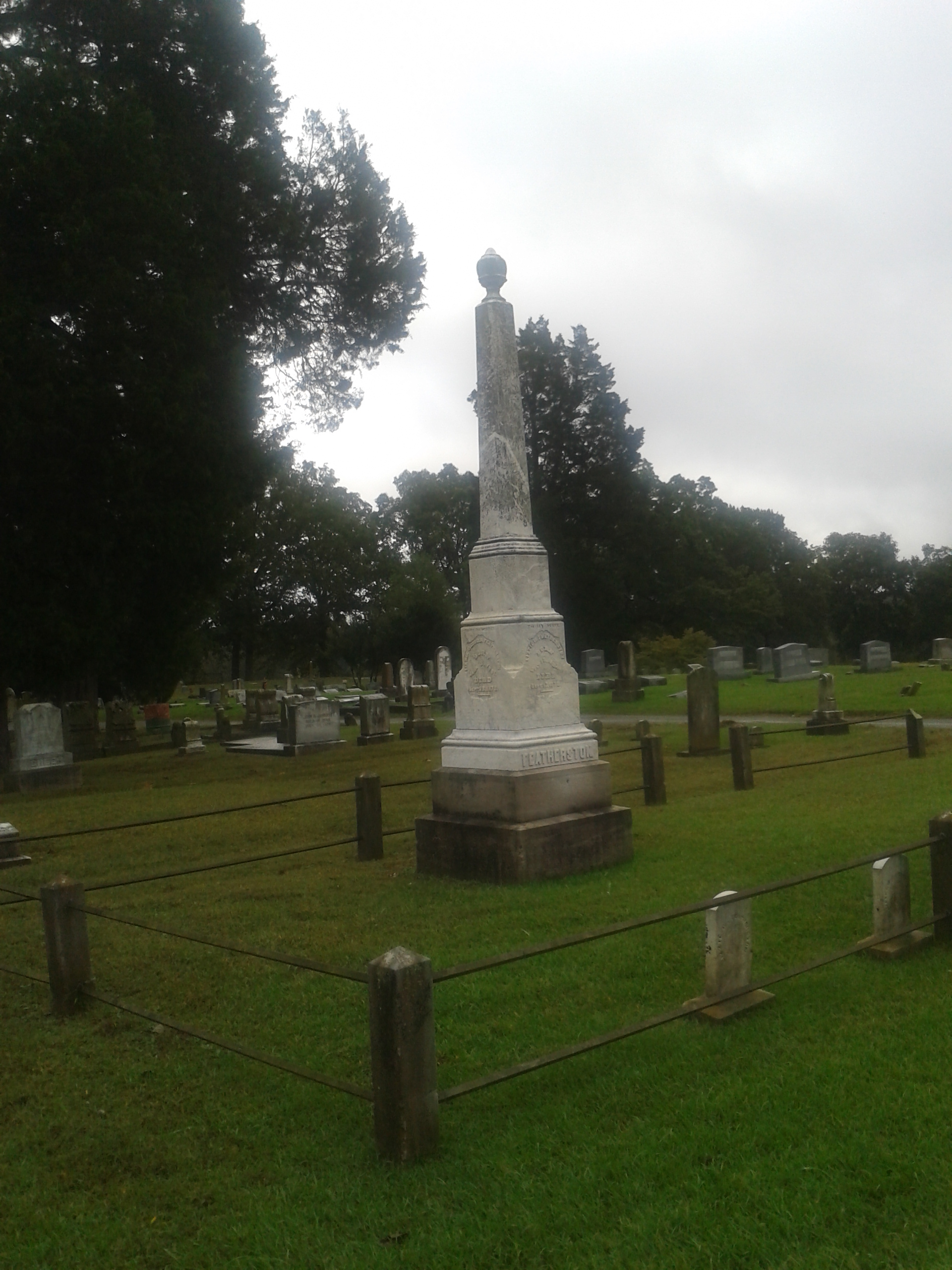
Featberston's funerary monument at Hillcrest Cemetery, Holly Springs

With the war over, Featherston returned to his home and family in Holly Springs. Later that same year, he was an unsuccessful candidate for United States Senator from Mississippi. Featherston returned to his law practice and later served as president of the state taxpayer's convention which protested against high taxes and wasteful government spending of carpetbagger Governor Adelbert Ames. He was elected to the State House of Representatives in 1876, where he continued his battle against the former Union general. Featherston's wife Elizabeth and several of their children died in the Lower Mississippi Valley yellow fever epidemic of 1878; four survived.

Featherston was elected to another term in the state legislature in 1880, where he chaired the Judiciary Committee. He was a delegate to the 1880 Democratic National Convention. In 1882, he became judge of the second judicial circuit of Mississippi. He was member of the State constitutional convention in 1890.

Featherston died from paralysis at his home in Holly Springs, Mississippi on May 28, 1891. He was interred in the town's Hillcrest Cemetery.

== See also ==
- List of American Civil War generals (Confederate)

== Sources ==
- United States Congress. "Winfield S. Featherston (id: F000055)". Biographical Directory of the United States Congress.
- Eicher, John H., and David J. Eicher, Civil War High Commands. Stanford: Stanford University Press, 2001. ISBN 978-0-8047-3641-1.
- Sifakis, Stewart. Who Was Who in the Civil War. New York: Facts On File, 1988. ISBN 978-0-8160-1055-4.
- Warner, Ezra J. (1959). Generals in Gray: Lives of the Confederate Commanders (1st ed.). Baton Rouge: Louisiana State University Press. OCLC 445052.

U.S. House of Representatives
Preceded by Stephen Adams	Member of the U.S. House of Representatives from Mississippi's 2nd congressional district 1847-1851	Succeeded by John A. Wilcox
