= Jan Bradley =

American soul singer (born 1943)

- Born: Addie Bradley; July 6, 1943 (age 83); Byhalia, Mississippi, U.S.
- Genres: Soul
- Occupation: Singer
- Years active: 1962–1971

Addie "Jan" Bradley (born July 6, 1943) is an American soul singer.

== Biography ==
Bradley was born in Byhalia, Mississippi, United States, and grew up in Robbins, Illinois. She was noticed by manager Don Talty (who also managed Phil Upchurch) at a high school talent show singing with the Passions. After graduating, she auditioned for Curtis Mayfield, and soon recorded the Mayfield-penned "We Girls", which became a hit regionally in the Midwest (on Talty's Formal Records label). Several singles followed, and another Mayfield song originally issued on Formal, "Mama Didn't Lie" (b/w "Lovers Like Me"), was released nationally in the U.S. by Chess Records in 1963 and hit No. 8 US Billboard R&B chart and No. 14 on the Billboard Hot 100.

Following the single's success, Mayfield and Chess got into a legal battle over the publishing rights to Mayfield's songs, and as a result Bradley was no longer able to work with him. She started writing her own songs and released several further singles on Chess. "I'm Over You" hit No. 24 R&B in 1965; other Chess releases included "Just a Summer Memory" b/w "He'll Wait on Me", "It's Just Your Way", and "These Tears" b/w "Baby What Can I Do". Bradley continued working with Talty after her arrangement with Chess ended, releasing singles for the smaller Adanti, Hootenanny, Doylen, Spectra Sound, and Night Owl labels.

Bradley stopped singing professionally in the early 1970s; she raised a family and became a social worker. She resides in the south suburbs of Chicago and has two children named Timothy and Jamila. She is also the grandmother of three and continues to sing in her church choir. Her records remained popular among devotees of Northern soul. Her catalog of music, both writing and singing, includes soul, pop and rock and roll.

== Discography ==
=== Singles ===
Year	Single	Peak chart positions	
Year	Single	US R&B	US Pop
1962	"Behind the Curtains"	―	—
1962	"We Girls"	―	―
1962	"Whole Lot of Soul"	―	―
1962	"Christmas Time"	―	―
1963	"These Tears"	―	―
1963	"Mama Didn't Lie"	8	14
1964	"Please Mr. DJ"	—	—
1964	"Curfew Blues"	—	—
1965	"Back in Circulation"	―	―
1965	"I'm Over You"	24	93
1965	"The Brush Off"	―	―
1966	"Just a Summer Memory"	―	―
1967	"Trust Me"	—	―
1967	"Your Kind of Lovin'"	―	―
1968	"You Gave Me What's Missing"	―	―
1971	"Tricks of the Trade"	―	―
"—" denotes releases that did not chart or were not released.
