= Tommy Woods (politician) =

American politician (1933–2020)

Member of the Mississippi House of Representatives from the 52nd district
- In office 1988 – July 30, 2012

Personal details
- Born: December 6, 1933 Byhalia, Mississippi
- Died: April 17, 2020 (aged 86) Byhalia, Mississippi
- Party: Democratic (Before 1996); Republican (1996–present)
- Spouse: Fay Woods
- Occupation: Farmer, cotton ginner

Thomas Lamar Woods (December 6, 1933 – April 17, 2020) was an American politician in the state of Mississippi. He served in the Mississippi House of Representatives for 25 years (1988–2012), representing the 52nd district, encompassing parts of DeSoto County and Marshall County initially as a Democrat but later on switched to the Republican. He was Chairman of the Interstate Cooperation committee, as well as a member of the County Affairs, Public Utilities, Transportation and Ways & Means committees.

Woods, an alumnus of Mississippi State University, was a farmer, cotton ginner and pilot. He was married to Fay Woods, with whom he has five children. He is a member of Sigma Phi Epsilon, the local farm bureau, AOPA, Marshall County Soil & Water Conservation and Northwest Junior College Advisory Board.

He resigned from the House, effective July 30, 2012. He had suffered a stroke in December 2011, which led to his decision to retire.
