= Civil War Earthworks at Tallahatchie Crossing =

- U.S. National Register of Historic Places
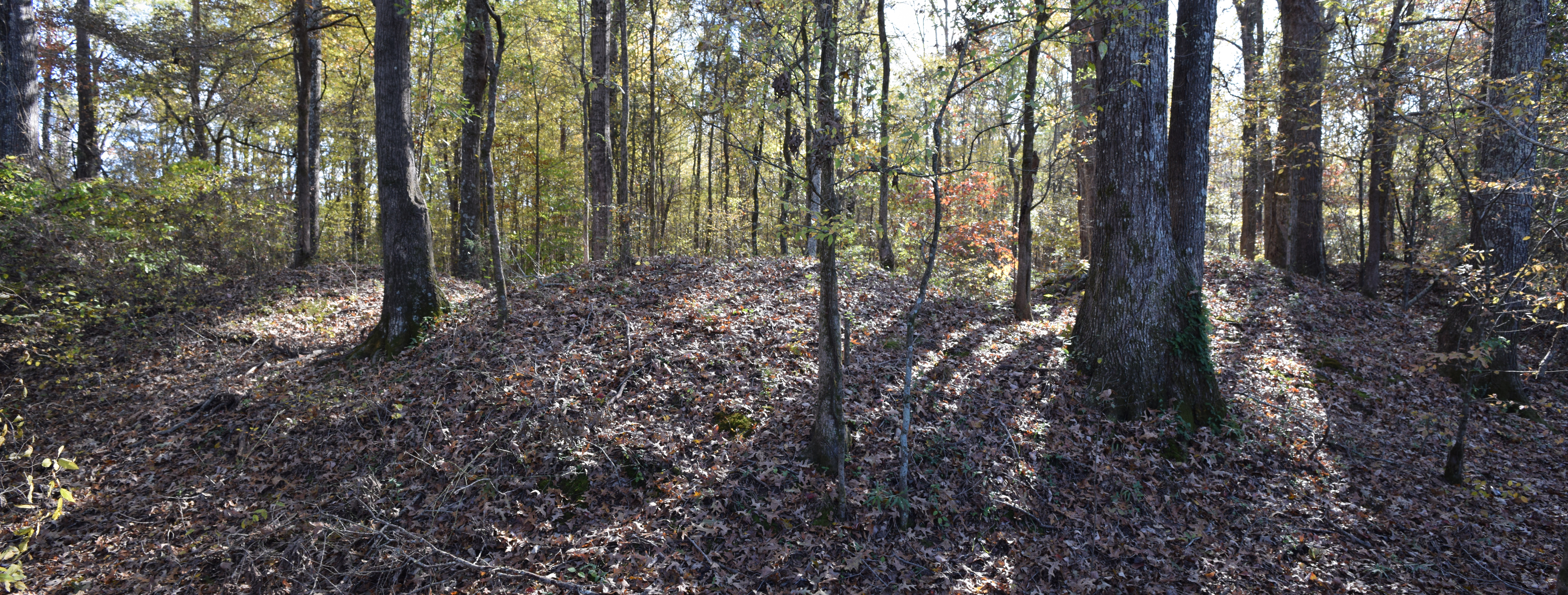
- The earthworks in 2018

- Location within Mississippi Location within the United States
- Location: Off Mississippi Highway 7 north of Abbeville, Mississippi, U.S.
- Coordinates: 34°33′25″N 89°29′16″W
- Built: 1862
- NRHP reference No.: 73001021
- Added to NRHP: August 14, 1973

The Civil War Earthworks at Tallahatchie Crossing is a Civil War earthwork in Marshall County, Mississippi. The earthworks are located on federal land owned by the Army Corps of Engineers and consist of eight parapets used for Union cannons, as well as infantry trenches.

The earthwork was built along the north bank of the Little Tallahatchie River in late 1862 by Union forces to defend the Mississippi Central Railroad and their supplies in Holly Springs as they moved south towards Oxford and ultimately Vicksburg.
