= Hillcrest Cemetery =

Cemetery in Holly Springs, Mississippi, US

- U.S. National Register of Historic Places
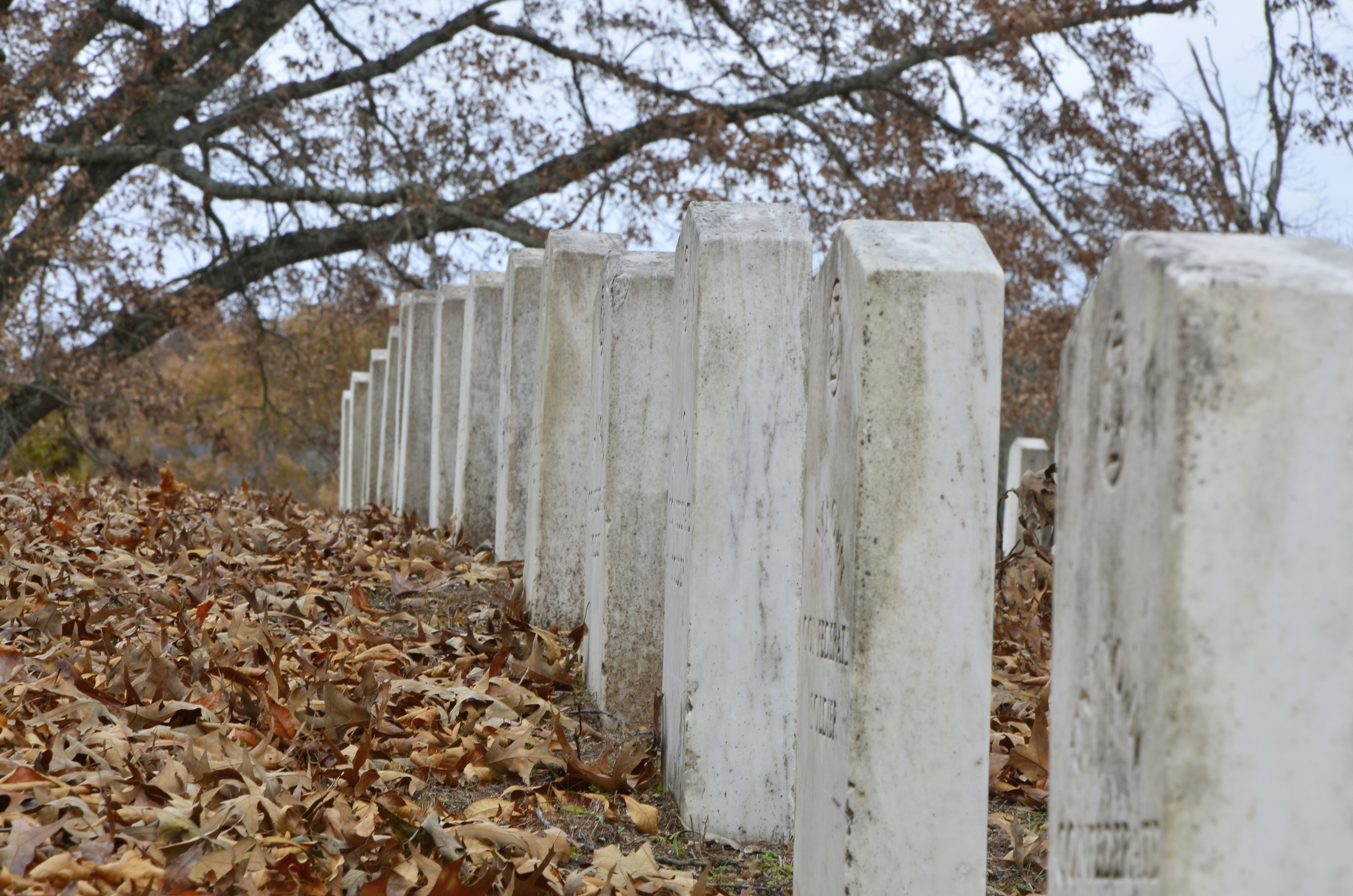
- Graves of Confederate States Army soldiers

- Location within Mississippi Location within the United States
- Location: Center Street, Holly Springs, Mississippi, U.S.
- Coordinates: 34°45′46″N 89°26′47″W
- Area: 24 acres (9.7 ha)
- Built: 1837
- MPS: Holly Springs MRA
- NRHP reference No.: 82003108
- Added to NRHP: June 28, 1982

Hillcrest Cemetery is a historic cemetery in Holly Springs, Mississippi, United States. Established in 1837, it is known as the "Little Arlington of the South". It contains the graves of a U.S. Senator and five Confederate generals.

== Location ==
The cemetery is located on Center Street in Holly Springs, Marshall County, Mississippi.

== History ==
The cemetery was established in 1837, when William S. Randolph, an early settler of Holly Springs, donated the land. The railings were designed by the Jones, McElwain and Company Iron Foundry prior to the Civil War.

It is known as the "Little Arlington of the South" in allusion to the Arlington National Cemetery near Washington, D.C. Notable burials include five generals of the Confederate States Army: Samuel Benton, Winfield S. Featherston, Daniel Govan, Edward Walthall, and Absolom M. West. Other notable burials include Wall Doxey, Benjamin D. Nabers, Hiram Rhodes Revels, and James F. Trotter. Also buried there are painter Kate Freeman Clark, the wife and son of Alamo defender Micajah Autry, and architect Spires Boling.

The cemetery was vandalized in 1980.

== Heritage significance ==
It has been listed on the National Register of Historic Places since June 28, 1982.
