= New Erection, Virginia =

New Erection
- Unincorporated community
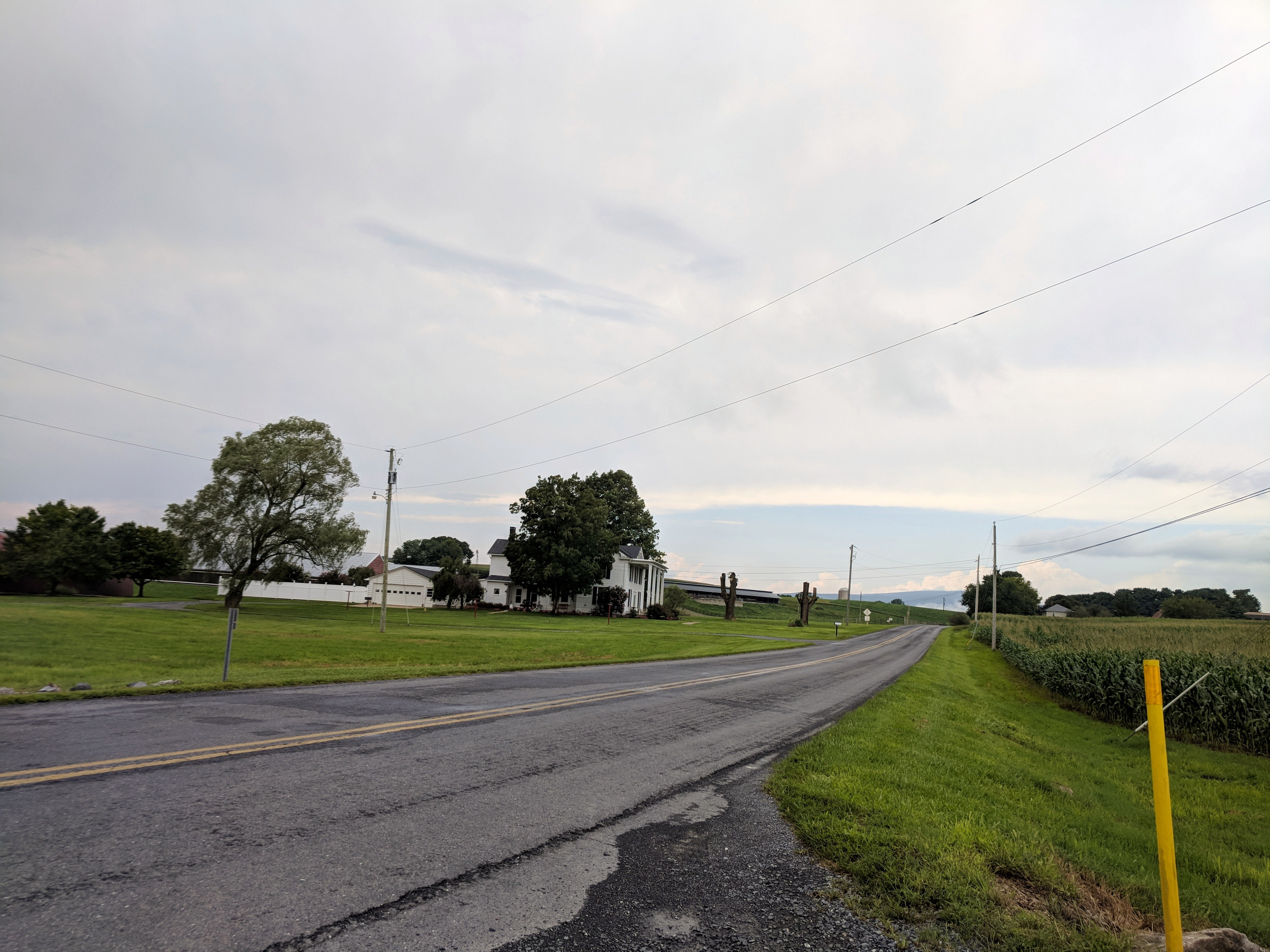

- Location in Virginia New Erection (the United States)
- Coordinates: 38°28′25″N 78°55′39″W
- Country: United States
- State: Virginia
- County: Rockingham County
- Elevation: 1,398 ft (426 m)
- GNIS feature ID: 1779334

New Erection is an unincorporated community located in Rockingham County, in the U.S. state of Virginia.

The community took its name from a Presbyterian church called "New Erection" because it was re-erected there, having previously been erected in Dayton.
