= Mississippi Central Railroad =

Railroad in Mississippi, USA

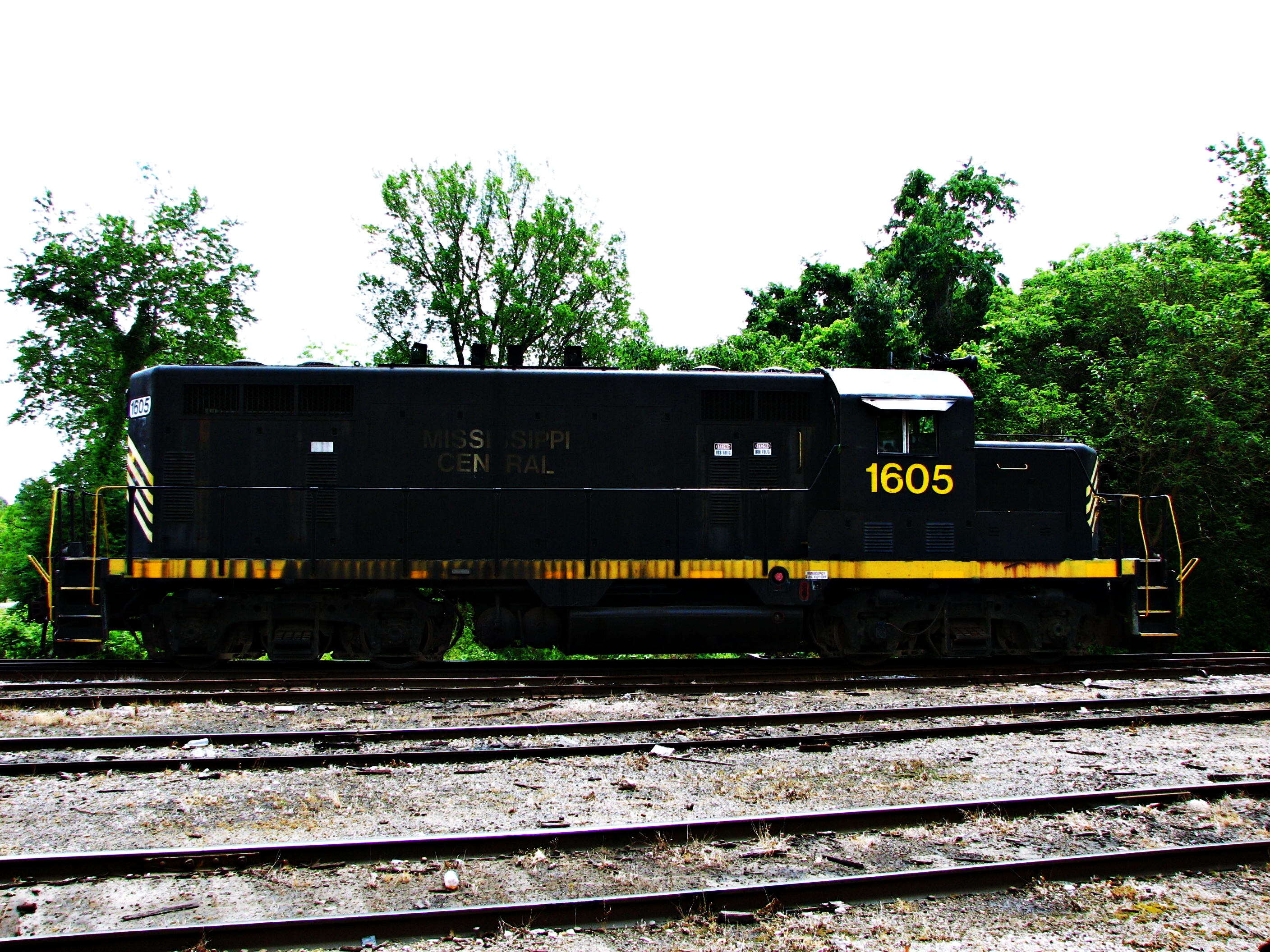
- MSCI locomotive 1605 in Holly Springs

Overview
- Headquarters: Holly Springs, MS
- Reporting mark: MSCI
- Locale: Southern United States
- Dates of operation: 1993–present
- Predecessor: Illinois Central Railroad

Technical
- Track gauge: 4 ft 8 1/2 in (1,435 mm) standard gauge
- Previous gauge: 5 ft (1,524 mm) and converted to 4 ft 9 in (1,448 mm) in 1886
- Length: 51 miles (82 km)

Other
- Website: https://pioneerlines.com/mississippi-central-railroad-msci/

Mississippi Central Railroad (reporting mark MSCI) is a short line railroad that operates two disconnected tracks: 51 miles from Oxford, Mississippi to Grand Junction, Tennessee, and 46 miles from Corinth, Mississippi to Red Bay, Alabama. It was formerly owned by Pioneer Railcorp, which was acquired by Patriot Rail. The railroad's principal commodities are aggregates and food products. The MSCI offers connections to the BNSF Railway in Holly Springs, the Norfolk Southern Railway in Grand Junction, and Canadian Pacific Kansas City in Corinth.

Mississippi Central purchased the assets of the Tishomingo Railroad near Iuka, Mississippi, in 2009. However, as of 2022, the line near Iuka is no longer operated. In 2013 the Mississippi Central purchased the Redmont Railway.

== Early history (1852–1861) ==
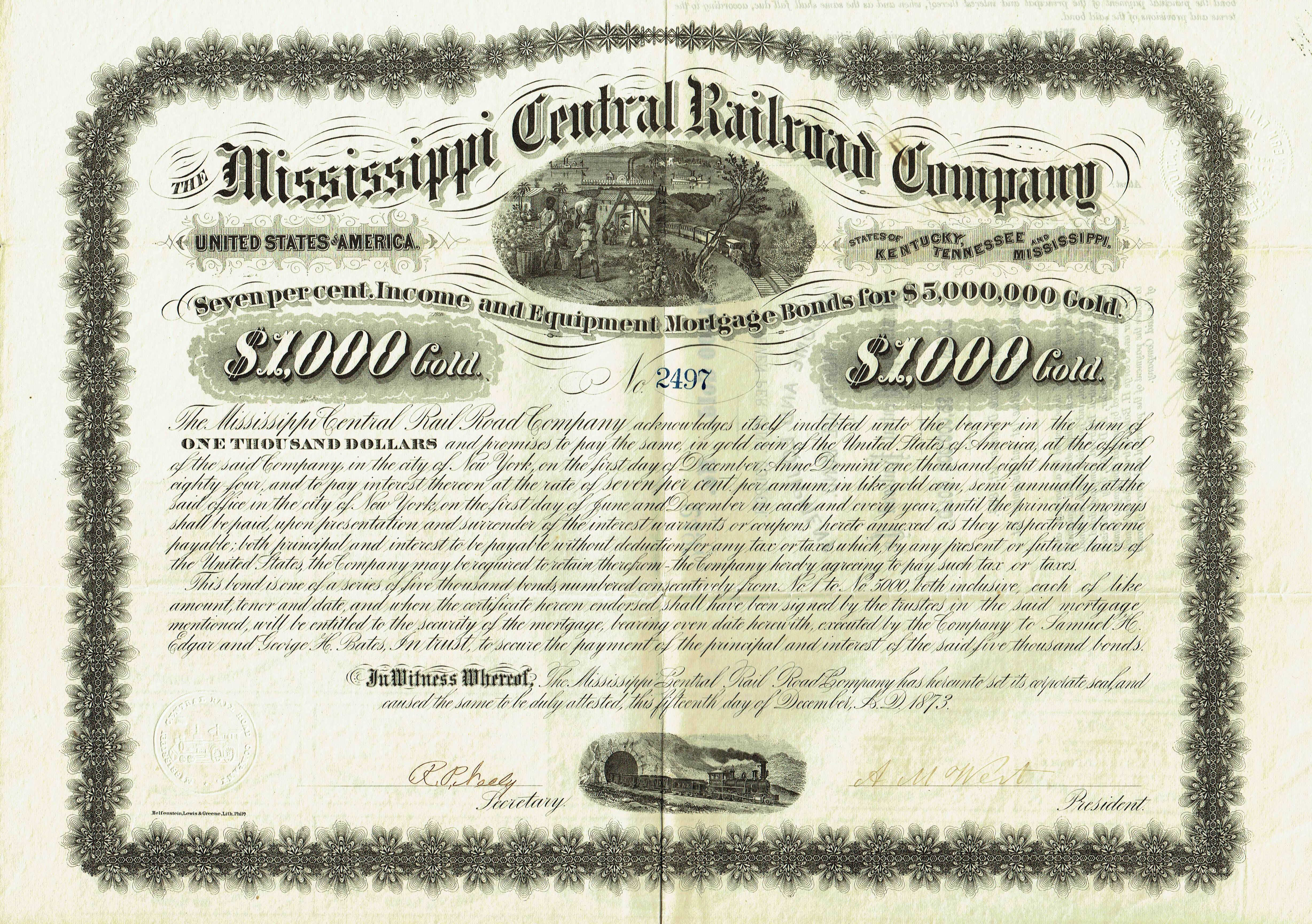
Bond of the Mississippi Central Railroad Company, issued 15. December 1873

In 1852, the Mississippi Central Railroad was chartered by the Mississippi Legislature to build a railroad from Canton, Mississippi, to Grand Junction, Tennessee, financed by wealthy cotton planters in La Grange, TN, and Oxford, MS, passing through the towns of Grenada, Water Valley, Oxford and Holly Springs. The first passenger trains from Holly Springs to Oxford ran in 1857. Passenger service further south to Water Valley began in 1858. On January 31, 1860, the final spike was driven in Winona, Mississippi, establishing the first ever rail link between the Great Lakes and the Gulf of Mexico. The 26 miles (42 km) line was constructed with 5 ft (1,524 mm) track gauge.

== Civil War (1861–1865) ==
In November 1862, General Ulysses S. Grant began the Mississippi Central Railroad Campaign down the line with the ultimate goal of capturing Vicksburg, Mississippi, in conjunction with General William Tecumseh Sherman. Grant established a base in Holly Springs and began advancing south along the railroad. Confederate soldiers built earthwork fortifications to defend the railroad's Tallahatchie River bridge near Abbeville but retreated south without firing a shot when they learned of a flanking maneuver by Grant. Skirmishes were fought along the railroad to Oxford and in the streets of the town itself. The Confederates were pushed further south past Water Valley, Mississippi, but managed to damage a railroad trestle and lead a successful ambush at Oakland, Mississippi, that stalled the Federal advance.

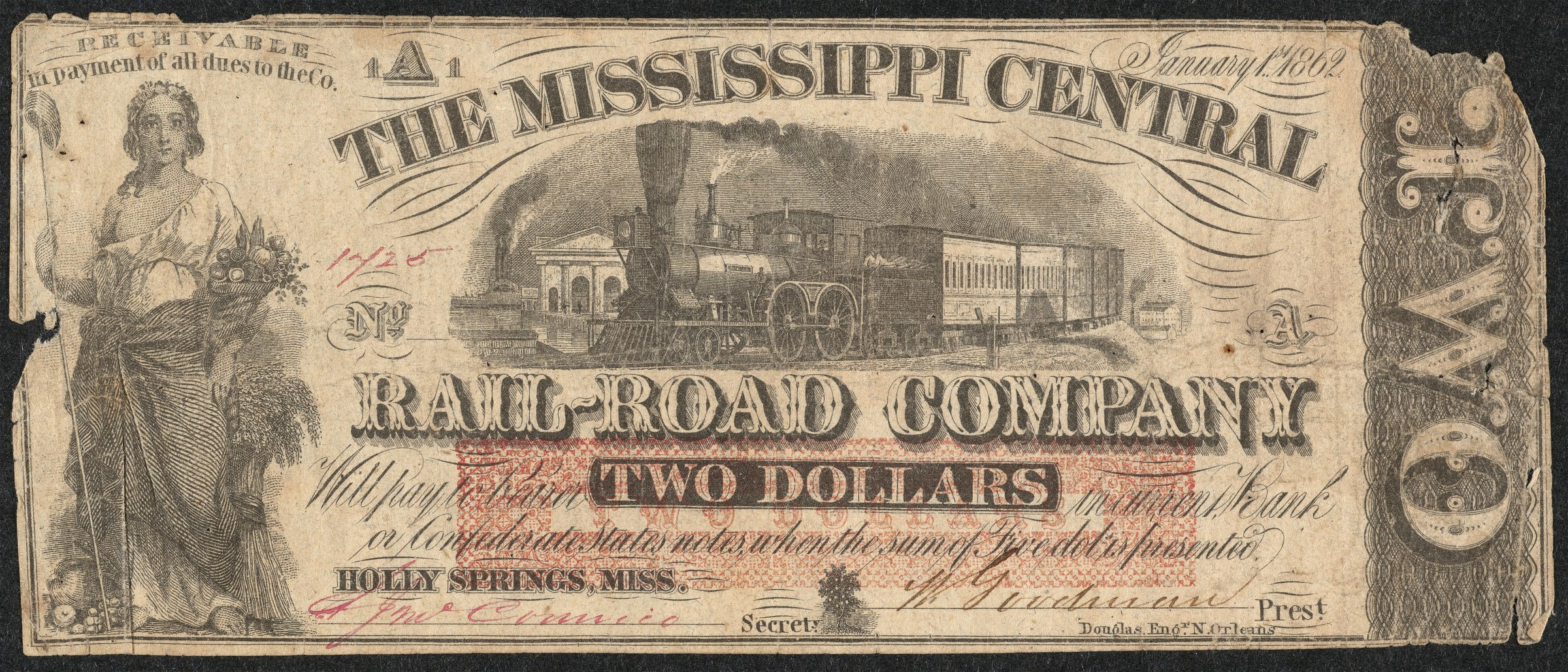
Two dollar note issued by the Mississippi Central Railroad Company in 1862

While Grant was stalled, Confederate General Van Dorn lead a successful cavalry raid on Grant's supply base at Holly Springs, burning most of his supplies and then moved north destroying the railroad and telegraph lines along the way. With the railroad destroyed Grant had no way to resupply his army and was forced to end the campaign and retreat to Memphis, TN.

== Illinois Central years (1872–1982) ==
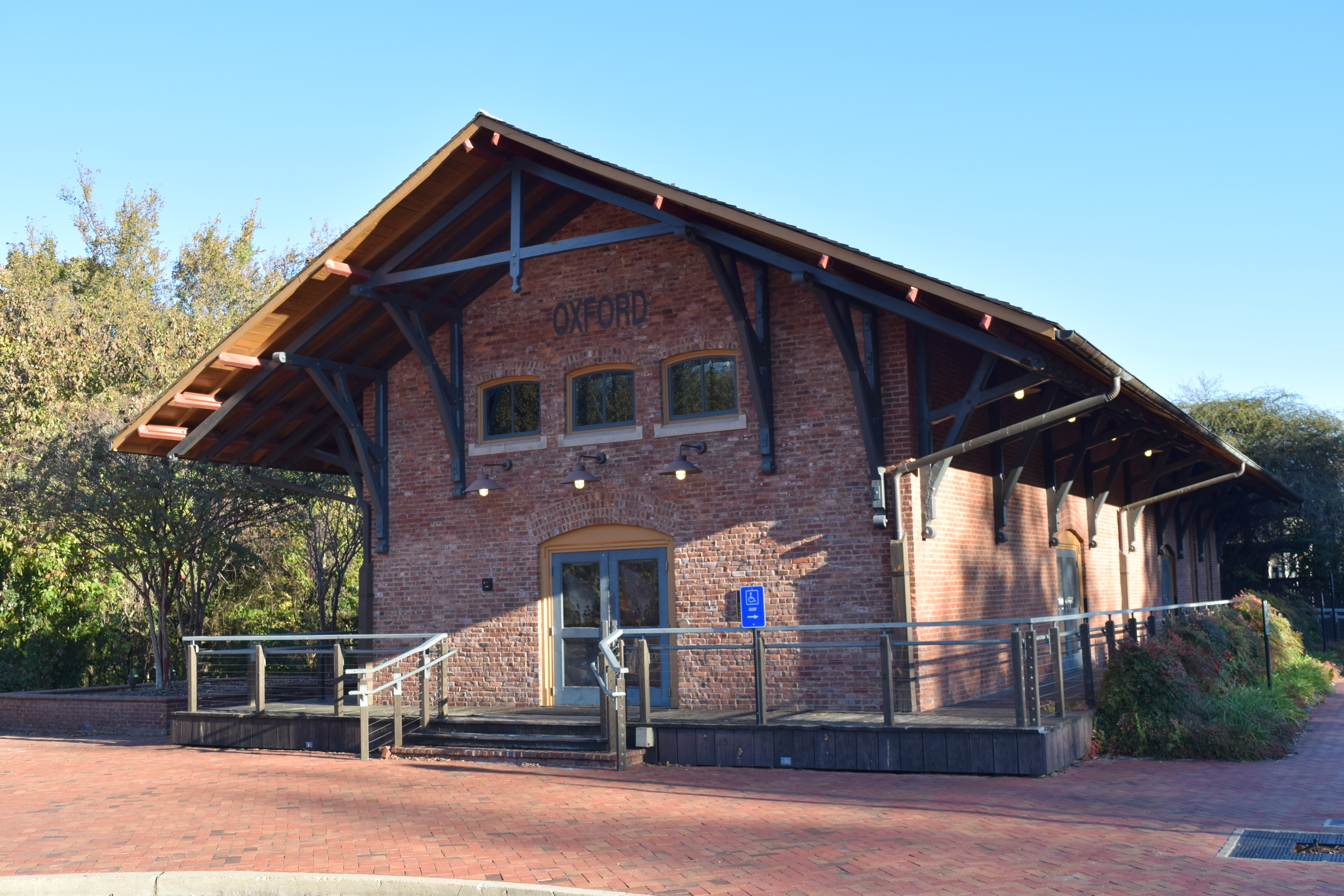
Illinois Central Depot in Oxford

After the Civil War, the Mississippi Central was rebuilt under the guidance of Absolom M. West and eventually the Illinois Central Railroad started to acquire the line in 1872. Illinois Central established their regional headquarters in Water Valley, MS, and based a large maintenance facility there. Famed engineer Casey Jones regularly operated passenger trains along the line and it was said locals could set their watches by him due to his strict adherence to published schedules. In 1927, Illinois Central started to shift traffic to their Grenada-Memphis route and closed the maintenance facility in Water Valley. In 1941, passenger service ended along the route and five years later the regional headquarters was relocated from Water Valley to Jackson, TN. Finally, in 1982, 30 miles of track between Oxford and Bruce Junction in Coffeeville was abandoned and the remaining northern portion of the line sold. Illinois Central continued to operate the southern portion of the line from the junction of the Mississippi and Skuna Valley Railroad to Grenada, MS.

== Accidents ==
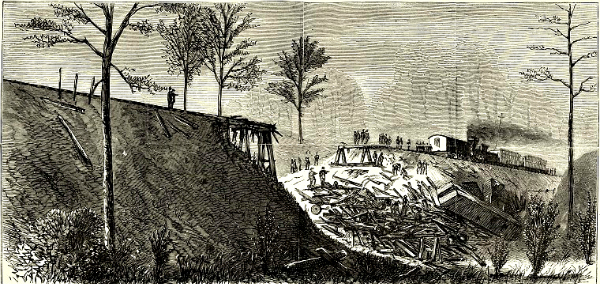
Illustration of the February 25, 1870 accident at Buckner's Trestle

On Sunday, October 19, 1862, two passenger trains collided one mile south of Duck Hill Station (near Grenada). Thirty-five passengers (mostly soldiers) were killed and 40-50 others were injured.

Buckner's Trestle was a 100-foot (30 m) long 50-foot (15 m) high bridge located south of Oxford that was the site of two accidents. The first occurred on February 25, 1870, killed 20 people, and injured 60 when the bridge collapsed. The second accident occurred on June 10, 1928, and injured 42 passengers but resulted in no fatalities.

== Present Day (1982–) ==
In March 1982, Kyle Railroad started operating the line under the name Natchez Trace Railway. In 1993, Pioneer Railcorp purchased the line and resurrected the name Mississippi Central Railroad. The primary customer was a particle board plant in Oxford.

In the mid-2000s, all track south of University-Oxford Airport was abandoned and the airport runway expanded over the right of way. MSCI's tracks now end at the airport's perimeter fence. The remaining abandoned right of way has been turned into two different rail trails (Oxford Depot Trail and South Campus Rail Trail, formerly the Thacker Mountain Rail-Trail) and the Gertrude Ford Parkway in Oxford, MS.

In September 2013, Mississippi Central purchased the former Redmont Railway between Corinth, Mississippi and Red Bay, Alabama. This line is now operated as the Redmont Division.

In February 2016 Roseburg Forest Products, the only user of the railroad south of Holly Springs, announced that it would idle its plant in Oxford, with the last scheduled rail service on March 4.

Little Tallahatchie River Bridge

== Motive power ==
MSCI currently operates three locomotives:

- 2 EMD GP16s (#1604 & 1605)
- 1 CF7 (#101; still painted as Redmont Railway)

== Preservation ==
- In 2003, the University of Mississippi completely restored the depot in Oxford. It is now used as a meeting venue.
- The depot in Water Valley houses the Casey Jones Museum. An Illinois Central banana reefer and caboose are on display there.
- The large passenger depot in Holly Springs has been preserved, and is being considered for use as a meeting venue.
- The depot in Winona survives as a restaurant and gym. A monument in front of the depot commemorates the completion of the Mississippi Central Railroad.
