= Red Banks, Mississippi =

- Census-designated place
- Location within Mississippi Location within the United States
- Coordinates: 34°50′05″N 89°33′48″W
- Country: United States
- State: Mississippi
- County: Marshall

Area
  - Total: 2.66 sq mi (6.89 km^{2})
  - Land: 2.66 sq mi (6.89 km^{2})
  - Water: 0 sq mi (0.00 km^{2})
- Elevation: 479 ft (146 m)

Population (2020)
  - Total: 215
  - Density: 80.8/sq mi (31.21/km^{2})
- Time zone: UTC-6 (Central (CST))
  - Summer (DST): UTC-5 (CDT)
- ZIP code: 38661 (Red Banks); 38635 (Holly Springs)
- Area code: 662
- GNIS feature ID: 2812734
- FIPS code: 28-61240

Red Banks is a census-designated place (CDP) and unincorporated community in Marshall County, Mississippi, United States. Per the 2020 census, the population was 215.

== History ==
The name of the community is derived from the color of the banks of the creek which flows past the south side of the settlement. In 1900, the community had a population of 79, two churches and a cotton gin.

Red Banks is located on the BNSF Railway and was incorporated on March 14, 1899. Its post office first began operating in 1847.

== Geography ==
Red Banks is in central Marshall County, 8 miles (13 km) northwest of Holly Springs, the county seat. Mississippi Highway 178 passes through the south side of the community, leading southeast to Holly Springs and northwest 8 miles (13 km) to Byhalia. Interstate 22 runs along the southern edge of the community, with access from Exit 21 (South Red Banks Road). I-22 leads southeast 67 miles (108 km) to Tupelo and northwest to the Memphis, Tennessee, area. Downtown Memphis is 38 miles (61 km) northwest of Red Banks.

According to the U.S. Census Bureau, the Red Banks CDP has an area of 2.66 square miles (6.89 km^{2}), all land. The center of town sits on a low divide between north-flowing tributaries of the Coldwater River and south-facing slopes that lead to Red Banks Creek, which flows west to the Coldwater. The entire community lies within the Tallahatchie River watershed.

== Demographics ==
Historical population
Census	Pop.	Note	%±
2020	215		—
U.S. Decennial Census; 2020

Red Banks was first listed as a census designated place in the 2020 U.S. census.

=== 2020 census ===
Red Banks CDP, Mississippi – Racial and ethnic composition Note: the US Census treats Hispanic/Latino as an ethnic category. This table excludes Latinos from the racial categories and assigns them to a separate category. Hispanics/Latinos may be of any race.
Race / Ethnicity (NH = Non-Hispanic)	Pop 2020	% 2020
White alone (NH)	150	69.77%
Black or African American alone (NH)	43	20.00%
Native American or Alaska Native alone (NH)	2	0.93%
Asian alone (NH)	3	1.40%
Pacific Islander alone (NH)	0	0.00%
Some Other Race alone (NH)	1	0.47%
Mixed Race or Multi-Racial (NH)	6	2.79%
Hispanic or Latino (any race)	10	4.65%
Total	215	100.00%

== Notable people ==
- Gus Cannon, blues musician who helped to popularize jug bands.
- Frank C. Rand, President of the International Shoe Company from 1916 to 1930 and its chairman from 1930 to 1949.
- George Yarbrough, former member of the Mississippi House of Representatives and the Mississippi Senate
