= Byhalia Creek =

Coordinates: 34.8270417°N 89.8039758°W

Location
- Country: United States
- State: Mississippi

Byhalia Creek is a stream in the U.S. state of Mississippi. It is a tributary to the Coldwater River.

Byhalia Creek is a name derived from the Choctaw language or Chickasaw language, purported to be a reference to white oaks. The name sometimes is spelled "Bihalia Creek".
