= Byhalia, Mississippi =

- Town
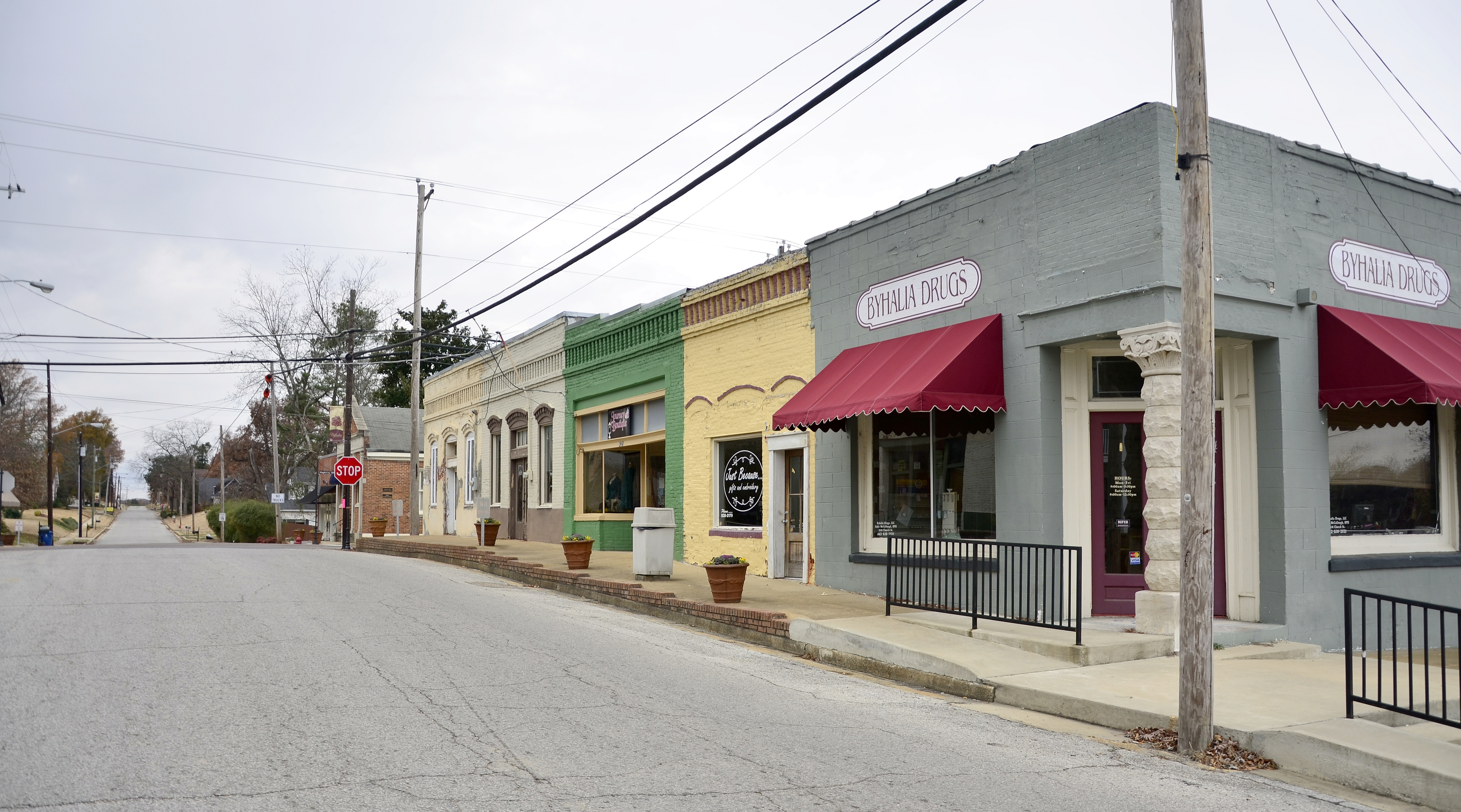
- The Byhalia Historic District along Church Street is listed on the National Register of Historic Places.

- Flag Seal

- Location in Marshall County and the state of Mississippi

- Location in the United States
- Coordinates: 34°52′30″N 89°41′32″W
- Country: United States
- State: Mississippi
- County: Marshall

Area
  - Total: 7.13 sq mi (18.5 km^{2})
  - Land: 7.11 sq mi (18.4 km^{2})
  - Water: 0.02 sq mi (0.052 km^{2})
- Elevation: 381 ft (116 m)

Population (2020)
  - Total: 1,339
  - Density: 188.43/sq mi (72.75/km^{2})
- Time zone: UTC-6 (Central (CST))
  - Summer (DST): UTC-5 (CDT)
- ZIP code: 38611
- Area code: 662
- FIPS code: 28-10060
- GNIS feature ID: 2405352
- Website: www.byhalia-ms.com

Byhalia (/baɪˈheɪljə/ bye-HAIL-yə), is a town in Marshall County, Mississippi, United States. The population was 1,339 as of the 2020 census.

== History ==
Byhalia was founded in the 1830s and named after Byhalia Creek, which flows past the community. The town was incorporated in 1873 and is located on the BNSF Railway.

Byhalia had a newspaper, The Byhalia Journal, that was published from 1883 to 1899. Sam Mims Jr., who was a member of the Mississippi Senate from 1916 to 1920, served as the editor.

== Geography ==
Byhalia is in northwestern Marshall County. Interstate 22 passes through the town south of its center, with access from Exit 14 (MS 309). Interstate 269, the beltway around Memphis, Tennessee, passes through the northwest extent of the town, with access from Exit 18 (also MS 309). I-22 leads southeast 16 miles (26 km) to Holly Springs, the Marshall county seat. Downtown Memphis is 30 miles (48 km) to the northwest via U.S. Route 78.

According to the U.S. Census Bureau, the town of Byhalia has a total area of 7.1 square miles (18 km^{2}), of which 0.02 square miles (0.05 km^{2}), or 0.27%, are water. Byhalia Creek passes through the east side of the town, flowing south and then west to the Coldwater River, part of the Tallahatchie River watershed.

== Demographics ==
Historical population
| Census | Pop. | Note | %± |
|---|---|---|---|
| 1880 | 346 | | — |
| 1890 | 474 | | 37.0% |
| 1900 | 760 | | 60.3% |
| 1910 | 511 | | −32.8% |
| 1920 | 514 | | 0.6% |
| 1930 | 565 | | 9.9% |
| 1940 | 543 | | −3.9% |
| 1950 | 581 | | 7.0% |
| 1960 | 674 | | 16.0% |
| 1970 | 702 | | 4.2% |
| 1980 | 757 | | 7.8% |
| 1990 | 955 | | 26.2% |
| 2000 | 706 | | −26.1% |
| 2010 | 1,302 | | 84.4% |
| 2020 | 1,339 | | 2.8% |
U.S. Decennial Census

=== 2020 census ===
Byhalia Racial Composition
| Race | Num. | Perc. |
|---|---|---|
| White | 624 | 46.6% |
| Black or African American | 595 | 44.44% |
| Native American | 6 | 0.45% |
| Pacific Islander | 3 | 0.22% |
| Other/Mixed | 45 | 2.39% |
| Hispanic or Latino | 79 | 5.9% |

As of the 2020 United States census, there were 1,440 people, 680 households, and 470 families residing in the town.

=== 2010 census ===
As of the 2010 United States census, there were 1,302 people living in the town. 51.4% were White, 44.9% Black or African American, 1.7% of some other race and 2.1% of two or more races. 4.0% were Hispanic or Latino (of any race).

=== 2000 census ===
The following demographic information is based on 2000 Census information; however, the population of Byhalia has significantly increased in recent years due to immigration and a 2005 annexation of adjacent area. The population in 2007 was estimated at over 2,000.

As of the census of 2000, there were 706 people, 275 households, and 188 families living in the town. The population density was 246.8 inhabitants per square mile (95.3/km^{2}). There were 306 housing units at an average density of 107.0 per square mile (41.3/km^{2}). The racial makeup of the town was 60.76% White, 35.69% African American, 0.14% Native American, 3.12% from other races, and 0.28% from two or more races. Hispanic or Latino of any race were 3.12% of the population.

There were 275 households, out of which 30.9% had children under the age of 18 living with them, 42.5% were married couples living together, 22.2% had a female householder with no husband present, and 31.6% were non-families. 27.6% of all households were made up of individuals, and 10.2% had someone living alone who was 65 years of age or older. The average household size was 2.57 and the average family size was 3.13.

In the town, the population was spread out, with 26.5% under the age of 18, 10.8% from 18 to 24, 25.8% from 25 to 44, 22.2% from 45 to 64, and 14.7% who were 65 years of age or older. The median age was 36 years. For every 100 females, there were 84.8 males. For every 100 females age 18 and over, there were 79.0 males.

The median income for a household in the town was $26,618, and the median income for a family was $35,313. Males had a median income of $34,375 versus $19,219 for females. The per capita income for the town was $15,156. About 25.0% of families and 26.4% of the population were below the poverty line, including 31.2% of those under age 18 and 39.2% of those age 65 or over.

== Education ==
The town of Byhalia is served by the Marshall County School District, one of the districts being supported by the Mississippi Teacher Corps.

== Notable people ==
- The Aces, Chicago blues band
- Erica Bougard, track and field Olympian
- Jan Bradley, soul singer
- Mike Bryan, jazz guitarist
- William Faulkner, author; died in Byhalia in 1962
- Bill Kinkade, member of the Mississippi House of Representatives
- Willie Taylor, former NBA player
- Tommy Woods, member of the Mississippi House of Representatives from 1988 to 2012
- H. Casey Young, member of the United States House of Representatives from 1875 to 1881 and 1883 to 1885
