= List of musicians from Mississippi =

This is a list of musical groups or organizations as well as musicians from the American state of Mississippi.

== Musical groups or organizations ==
- 3 Doors Down – rock band (Escatawpa)
- Atomship – alternative metal band (Ocean Springs)
- Bass Drum of Death – garage / punk rock band (Oxford)
- Beanland – jam band (Oxford)
- The Blackwood Brothers – gospel singers (Choctaw County)
- Blue Mountain – alternative country band (Oxford)
- Cadillac Don & J-Money – rap duo (Crawford)
- The Chambers Brothers – soul music group (Carthage)
- Colour Revolt – indie rock band (Oxford)
- David and the Giants – Christian rock band (Laurel)
- Five Blind Boys of Mississippi – gospel singers (Piney Woods)
- Joe Frank and the Knights – garage rock band (Leland)
- Jonezetta – rock band (Clinton)
- Kudzu Kings – alternative country music band (Oxford)
- Mississippi Mass Choir – gospel choir (Jackson)
- North Mississippi Allstars – blues-rock, jam band (Hernando)
- Seeker & Servant – worship music (Jackson)
- Rae Sremmurd – hip hop group (Tupelo)
- Saving Abel – rock band (Corinth)
- Wavorly – Christian rock band (Tupelo)
- The Weeks – indie rock band (Florence)
- Young Buffalo – indie rock band (Oxford)

== Musicians ==
=== A–C ===
- John Luther Adams (born 1953) – composer of music inspired by nature (Meridian)
- Woodrow Adams (1917–1988) – blues musician (Tchula)
- Tommy Aldridge (born 1950) – drummer for Ozzy Osbourne and Whitesnake (Jackson)
- Charlie Allen (1908–1972) – jazz trumpeter (Jackson)
- Mose Allison (1927–2016) – jazz musician (near Tippo, Tallahatchie County)
- Robert Anderson (1919–1995) – gospel singer-composer and pianist (Anguilla)
- Steve Azar (born 1964) – country singer (Greenville)
- Glen Ballard (born 1953) – songwriter and record producer (Natchez)
- Tommy Bankhead (1931–2000) – blues musician (Lake Cormorant)
- Willie Banks (1929–1993) – gospel singer and songwriter (Raymond)
- David Banner (born 1973) – rapper and producer (Brookhaven)
- Matt Barlow (born 1970) – lead singer of the metal band Iced Earth (Biloxi)
- Prentiss Barnes (1925–2006) – rhythm and blues singer (Magnolia)
- Lance Bass (born 1979) – member of pop group 'N Sync (Laurel)
- Jeff Bates (born 1963) – country music singer-songwriter (Bunker Hill)
- Robert Belfour (1940–2015) – blues musician (Red Banks, Mississippi)
- Carey Bell (1936–2007) – Chicago blues harmonica player (Macon)
- Big Time Sarah (1953–2015) – blues singer (Coldwater)
- James Blackwood (1919–2002) – one of The Blackwood Brothers (near Ackerman)
- Blind Mississippi Morris (born 1955) – blues artist (Clarksdale)
- Lucille Bogan (1897–1948) – blues singer (Amory)
- Houston Boines (1918–1970) – blues singer and harmonicist (Hazlehurst)
- Charley Booker (1925–1989) – blues singer and guitarist (Moorhead)
- Eddie Boyd (1914–1994) – blues musician (Clarksdale)
- Ishmon Bracey (1889–1970) – blues guitarist and singer (Bayram)
- Bobby Bradford (born 1934) – jazz musician and composer (Cleveland)
- Jan Bradley (born 1943) – soul singer (Byhalia)
- Delaney Bramlett (1939–2008) – singer-songwriter (Pontotoc)
- Jackie Brenston (1930–1979) – R&B singer and saxophonist (Clarksdale)
- Big Bill Broonzy (1898–1958) – blues singer-songwriter and guitarist (Scott)
- Eddie "Bongo" Brown (1932–1984) – percussionist (Clarksdale)
- Willie Brown (1900–1952) – delta blues guitarist and singer (Shelby)
- Jimmy Buffett (1946–2023) – multi-genre singer-songwriter (Pascagoula)
- R. L. Burnside (1926–2005) – blues singer-songwriter (Harmontown)
- Jerry Butler (born 1939) – soul singer-songwriter (Sunflower)
- G. C. Cameron (born 1945) – soul and R&B singer (Jackson)
- Choker Campbell (1916–1993) – soul saxophonist and bandleader (Shelby)
- Ace Cannon (1934–2018) – tenor and alto saxophonist (Grenada)
- Gus Cannon (1883–1979) – jug band musician (Red Banks)
- Bo Carter (1893–1964) – blues singer (Bolton)
- Johnny Carver (born 1940) – country singer (near Jackson)
- Sam Chatmon (1897–1983) – blues singer; brother of Bo Carter (Bolton)
- Otis Clay (1942–2016) – R&B and soul musician (Waxhaw)
- Chalmers Clifton (1889–1966) – conductor and composer (Jackson)
- Odia Coates (1942–1991) – pop singer (Vicksburg)
- Hank Cochran (1935–2010) – country music singer-songwriter (Isola)
- Bill Coday (1942–2008) – soul singer (Coldwater)
- Phil Cohran (1927–2017) – jazz musician (Oxford)
- Mike Compton (born 1956) – bluegrass mandolin player (Meridian)
- Sam Cooke (1931–1964) – gospel, R&B, soul, and pop singer (Clarksdale)
- James Cotton (1935–2017) – blues harmonica player and singer-songwriter (Tunica)
- Arthur "Big Boy" Crudup (1905–1974) – delta blues singer and guitarist (Forest)
- George Cummings (born 1938) – guitarist and songwriter (Meridian)

=== D–G ===
- Olu Dara (born 1941) – jazz musician (Natchez)
- Lester Davenport (1932–2009) – blues harmonica player and singer (Tchula)
- Little Sammy Davis (1928–2018) – blues harmonica, guitar, singer (Winona)
- Paul Davis (1948–2008) – singer-songwriter (Meridian)
- Walter Davis (1911/2–1963) – blues musician and songwriter (Grenada)
- Jimmy Dawkins (1936–2013) – blues guitarist and singer (Tchula)
- Dear Silas (born 1986) – hip-hop rapper and singer (Jackson)
- Mattie Delaney (c. 1905 – fl. 1930) – blues singer and guitarist (near Goodman).
- Al Denson (born 1960) – contemporary Christian artist (Starkville)
- Bo Diddley (1928–2008) – rock & roll/R&B singer-songwriter (McComb)
- Diplo (born 1978) – electronic dance music DJ and producer (Tupelo)
- Willie Dixon (1915–1992) – blues bassist, singer-songwriter record producer (Vicksburg)
- Marshall Drew (born 1984) – folk rock singer-songwriter (Clarksdale)
- Judy Dunaway (born 1964) – avant-garde composer, free improvisor, conceptual sound artist (Mississippi)
- Omar Kent Dykes (born 1950) – blues guitarist and singer (McComb)
- David "Honeyboy" Edwards (1915–2011) – delta blues musician (Shaw)
- Meredith Edwards (born 1984) – country singer (Clinton)
- Robert "Big Mojo" Elem (1928–1997) – blues bassist and singer (Itta Bena)
- Ruby Elzy (1908–1943) – opera singer (Pontotoc)
- Lehman Engel (1910–1982) – composer and conductor (Jackson)
- Chris Ethridge (1947–2012) – country rock musician, songwriter (Meridian)
- Shelly Fairchild (born 1977) – country musician (Clinton)
- Nancy Plummer Faxon (1914–2005) – organist and composer (Jackson)
- Charlie Feathers (1932–1998) – (Holly Springs)
- Steve Forbert (born 1954) – pop music singer-songwriter (Meridian)
- Lee Garrett (born 1943) – R&B singer and songwriter (Mississippi)
- Bobbie Gentry (born 1944) – singer-songwriter (near Woodland)
- Mickey Gilley (1936–2022) – country singer and musician (Natchez)
- Boyd Gilmore (1905 or 1910–1976) – blues musician (either near Inverness, Mississippi, in 1905, or in 1910 in Belzoni, Mississippi)
- Al Goodman (1943–2010) – R&B/soul singer (Jackson)
- Mark Gray (1952–2016) – country music singer and keyboardist (Vicksburg)
- Garland Green (born 1942) – soul singer and pianist (Dunleith)
- Lloyd Green (born 1937) – country music steel guitarist (Leaf)
- Elizabeth Greenfield (c. 1820–1876) – concert singer; known as "The Black Swan"; born in slavery in Natchez

=== H–K ===
- Richard "Hacksaw" Harney (1902–1973) – blues guitarist and pianist (Money)
- Bill Harvey (1918–1964) – bandleader (Winona)
- Ted Hawkins (1936–1995) – singer-songwriter (Biloxi)
- Jessie Mae Hemphill (1923–2006) – blues musician (near Como)
- Sid Hemphill (1876–1963) – blues musician and string bandleader (Panola County)
- Michael Henderson (1951–2022) – R&B bass guitarist and singer (Yazoo City)
- Caroline Herring (born 1969) – bluegrass musician (Canton)
- Faith Hill (born 1967) – country/pop singer (Ridgeland)
- Kim Hill (born 1963) – Christian singer-songwriter (Starkville)
- King Solomon Hill (1897–19400) – blues musician (McComb)
- Rosa Lee Hill (1910–1968) – blues musician (Como)
- Ernie Hines (born 1938) – soul musician (Jackson)
- Milt Hinton (1910–2000) – jazz double bassist (Vicksburg)
- Eddie Hodges (born 1947) – actor, singer, producer (Hattiesburg)
- Jimmy "Duck" Holmes (born 1947) – blues musician and Blue Front Cafe proprietor (Yazoo County)
- John Lee Hooker (1917–2001) – blues singer-songwriter and blues guitarist (Tutwiler)
- Big Walter Horton (1917–1981) – blues harmonica player (Horn Lake)
- Son House (1902–1988) – blues singer and guitarist (Lyon)
- Randy Houser (born 1975) – country music artist (Lake)
- Thelma Houston (born 1943) – R&B singer-songwriter (Leland)
- Guy Hovis (born 1941) – big band singer (Tupelo)
- Howlin' Wolf (1910–1976) – blues singer, guitarist, harmonica player (West Point)
- Cary Hudson – lead singer and guitarist for alternative country band Blue Mountain (Sumrall)
- Mississippi John Hurt (c. 1893–1966) – country blues singer and guitarist (Teoc)
- Clifton Hyde (born 1976) – multi-instrumentalist and producer (Hattiesburg)
- Carl Jackson (born 1953) – country and bluegrass musician (Louisville)
- Cordell Jackson (1923–2004) – rockabilly guitarist, producer (Pontotoc)
- George Jackson (1945–2013) – blues and soul singer (Indianola)
- Elmore James (1918–1963) – blues guitarist and singer-songwriter (Richland)
- Skip James (1902–1969) – delta blues guitarist, pianist, singer-songwriter (Bentonia)
- Jimi Jamison (1951–2014) – singer-songwriter (Durant)
- Roosevelt Jamison (1936–2013) – songwriter, publicist (Olive Branch)
- Jai Johanny "Jaimoe" Johanson (born 1944) – drummer in The Allman Brothers Band (Ocean Springs)
- Big Jack Johnson (1940–2011) – blues musician (Lambert)
- Jimmy Johnson (1928–2022) – blues guitarist and singer (Holly Springs)
- Robert Johnson (1911–1938) – delta blues musician (Hazlehurst)
- Syl Johnson (1936–2022) – blues and soul singer (near Holly Springs)
- Tommy Johnson (1896–1956) – blues guitarist, singer and songwriter (Terry)
- Willie Johnson (1923–1995) – electric blues guitarist (Senatobia)
- Margie Joseph (born 1950) – R&B and soul singer (Gautier)
- Junior Kimbrough (1930–1998) – blues artist (Hudsonville)
- Albert King (1923–1992) – blues guitarist and singer (Indianola)
- B. B. King (1925–2015) – blues guitarist and singer-songwriter (near Berclair)
- Little Freddie King (born 1940) – delta blues guitarist (McComb)
- Fern Kinney (born 1949) – rhythm & blues and disco music entertainer (Jackson)
- J. Fred Knobloch (born 1953) – country singer-songwriter (Jackson)
- Big K.R.I.T. (born 1986) – hip-hop artist (Meridian)

=== L–M ===
- Skylar Laine (born 1994) – country music singer; American Idol finalist (Brandon)
- Sonny Landreth (born 1951) – blues musician and slide guitar player (Canton)
- Denise LaSalle (1934–2018) – blues and contemporary R&B singer-songwriter, record producer (near Sidon)
- Rick Lawson (born 1973) – soul and R&B singer (Raymond)
- Lafayette Leake (1919–1990) – blues and jazz pianist, organist, vocalist and composer (Winona)
- Chris LeDoux (1948–2005) – country music singer-songwriter (Biloxi)
- Floyd Lee (1933–2020) – blues musician and founding member of Music Under New York (Lamar)
- Mylon LeFevre (1944–2023) – gospel and Christian rock singer (Gulfport)
- J. B. Lenoir (1929–1967) – blues guitarist and singer-songwriter (Monticello)
- Robert "Squirrel" Lester (1942–2010) – second tenor of The Chi-Lites (McComb)
- Willie Lofton (1897–1956 or 1962) – delta blues musician (Copiah County)
- Bobby Lounge (born 1950) – singer-songwriter (McComb)
- Willie Love (1906–1953) – blues pianist (Duncan)
- Dent May (born 1985) – musician (Jackson)
- Tommy McClennan (1908–c. 1962) – delta blues singer and guitarist (Durant)
- George McConnell – rock guitarist (Vicksburg)
- Kansas Joe McCoy (1905–1950) – blues musician and songwriter (Raymond)
- Papa Charlie McCoy (1909–1950) – delta blues musician and songwriter (Jackson)
- Mississippi Fred McDowell (1904–1972) – blues musician and songwriter (Born in Rossville, Tennessee, resided in Como)
- L. C. McKinley (1918–1970) – Chicago blues guitarist, singer (Winona)
- Hayes McMullan (1902–1986) – blues musician (either New Hope or Murphreesboro)
- Scott McQuaig (1959) – country music singer and songwriter (Meridian)
- Mulgrew Miller (1955–2013) – jazz pianist (Greenwood)
- Little Milton (1934–2005) – blues and soul vocalist and guitarist (Inverness)
- Mississippi Matilda (1914–1978) – blues singer (Hattiesburg)
- Mississippi Slim (1923–1973) – country singer and guitarist (Smithville)
- Willie Mitchell (1928–2010) – popular music trumpeter, bandleader and record producer (Ashland)
- Monteco (born 1978), R&B singer (Mississippi)
- Dorothy Moore (born 1946) – pop, R&B, gospel singer (Jackson)
- Johnny B. Moore (born 1950) – blues singer and guitarist (Clarksdale)
- Jasmine Murray (born 1992) – singer and beauty pageant titleholder; finalist, 8th season, American Idol (2009) (Columbus)
- Charlie Musselwhite (born 1944) – blues-harp player and bandleader (Kosciusko)
- Sam Myers (1936–2006) – blues musician, harmonica player, and songwriter (Laurel)

=== N–S ===
- Sonny Boy Nelson (1908–1998) – blues multi-instrumentalist (Utica)
- Brandy Norwood (born 1979) – R&B singer-songwriter/record producer (McComb)
- Willie Norwood (born 1955) – gospel singer (McComb)
- Maty Noyes (born 1997) – pop singer (Corinth)
- Alexander O'Neal (born 1953) – soul singer (Natchez)
- Paul Overstreet (born 1955) – country music singer-songwriter (Vancleave)
- Ginny Owens (born 1975) – contemporary Christian music singer-songwriter (Jackson)
- Jack Owens (1904–1997) – blues singer (Bentonia)
- Junior Parker (1932–1971) – Memphis blues singer and musician (near Bobo)
- Michael Passons (born 1965) – founding member of the Christian band Avalon (Yazoo City)
- Bertha Lee Pate (1902–1975) – blues singer (common-law wife of Charley Patton (as below) (Lula)
- Charley Patton (1891–1934) – delta blues musician and songwriter (near Edwards)
- Dion Payton (1950–2021) – blues guitarist and singer (Greenwood)
- Pinetop Perkins (1913–2011) – delta blues and boogie-woogie pianist (Belzoni)
- Robert Petway (born c. 1903, date of death unknown) – blues singer and guitarist (probably Itta Bena)
- Robert Powell (1932–2025) – composer, organist, choir director (Benoit)
- Elvis Presley (1935–1977) – multi-genre musician (Tupelo)
- Leontyne Price (born 1927) – opera singer (Laurel)
- Charley Pride (1934–2020) – country music singer (Sledge)
- John Primer (born 1945) – blues singer and guitarist (Camden).
- Ray J (born 1981) – contemporary R&B and hip hop singer/record producer (McComb)
- Jimmy Reed (1925–1976) – blues singer and musician (Dunleith)
- La'Porsha Renae (born 1993) – musician (McComb)
- Del Rendon (1965–2005) – singer/songwriter (Starkville)
- Mack Rice (1933–2016) – songwriter (Clarksdale)
- LeAnn Rimes (born 1982) – country and pop singer (Jackson)
- Jamal Roberts (born 1997) – winner of American Idol season 23 (Meridian)
- Fenton Robinson (1935–1997) – blues musician (Greenwood)
- Andy Rodgers (1922–2004) – blues harmonicist, guitarist, singer, and songwriter (Liberty)
- Jimmie Rodgers (1897–1933) – country singer (Meridian)
- Jimmy Rogers (1924–1997) – blues singer and guitarist (near Ruleville)
- Doctor Ross (1925–1993) – blues harmonica player (Tunica)
- David Ruffin (1941–1991) – former lead singer of The Temptations (Whynot)
- Jimmy Ruffin (1939–2014) – soul and R&B singer (Collinsville)
- Otis Rush (1935–2018) – blues musician (Philadelphia)
- Oliver Sain (1932–2003) – saxophonist, drummer, songwriter, record producer (Dundee)
- Magic Sam (1937–1969) – Chicago blues and soul blues musician (Grenada County)
- Johnny Seay (1940–2016) – country singer (Gulfport)
- Toni Seawright (born 1964) – singer-songwriter (Pascagoula)
- J.D. Short (1902–1962) – blues singer, guitarist and harmonicist (Port Gibson)
- Jumpin' Gene Simmons (1933–2006) – rockabilly singer (Tupelo)
- Henry "Son" Sims (1890–1958) – blues fiddler (Anguilla)
- Henry Sloan (1870–probably 1948) – blues guitarist (Hinds County)
- Byther Smith (1932–2021) – blues musician (Monticello)
- Otis Spann (1930–1970) – blues musician (Belzoni)
- Britney Spears (born 1981) – pop singer (McComb)
- Judson Spence (born 1965) – songwriter and multi-instrumentalist (Pascagoula)
- Houston Stackhouse (1910–1980) – delta blues guitarist and singer (Wesson)
- Roebuck "Pop" Staples (1914–2000) – founder of The Staple Singers (near Winona)
- Rogers Stevens (born 1970) – guitarist for the band Blind Melon (West Point)
- Lisa Stewart (born 1968) – country musician (Louisville)
- William Grant Still (1895–1978) – classical composer (Woodville)
- Barrett Strong (1941–2023) – singer-songwriter (West Point)
- Marty Stuart (born 1958) – country music singer (Philadelphia)
- Hubert Sumlin (1931–2011) – blues musician (Greenwood)
- Deanna Summers (1940–2017) – songwriter (New Albany)
- Sunnyland Slim (1906–1995) – blues pianist (near Vance)

=== T–Z ===
- Ty Tabor (born 1961) – guitarist, singer-songwriter for rock band King's X (Pearl)
- Eddie Taylor (1923–1985) – blues guitarist and singer (Benoit)
- Hound Dog Taylor (1915–1975) – blues guitarist and singer (Natchez)
- Melvin Taylor (born 1959) – blues musician (Jackson).
- Johnny Temple (1906–1968) – blues guitarist and singer (Canton)
- Ernie Terrell (1939–2014) – boxer, singer and record producer (Inverness)
- Jean Terrell (born 1944) – R&B and jazz singer (Belzoni)
- James Thomas (1926–1993) – blues musician (Eden)
- Rufus Thomas (1917–2001) – R&B, funk, soul singer (Cayce)
- Shardé Thomas (born 1990) – Fife player in the vanishing American fife and drum blues tradition (Coldwater)
- Lil' Dave Thompson (1969–2010) – blues singer and guitarist (Jackson)
- Todd Tilghman (born 1978) – gospel singer (Meridian)
- T-Model Ford (1923–2013) – blues musician (Forest)
- Ike Turner (1931–2007) – multi-genre musician, record producer (Clarksdale)
- Conway Twitty (1933–1993) – country singer-songwriter (Friars Point)
- L. C. Ulmer (1928–2016) – delta blues (Stringer)
- Bobby V (born 1980) – singer-songwriter (Jackson)
- Mose Vinson (1917–2002) – boogie-woogie, blues and jazz pianist and singer (Holly Springs)
- Freddie Waits (1943–1989) – hard bop and post-bop drummer (Jackson)
- Wee Willie Walker (1941–2019) – soul and blues singer (Hernando)
- Travis Wammack (born 1946) – rock and roll guitarist (Walnut)
- Walter Ward (1940–2006) – R&B singer; lead vocalist of The Olympics (Jackson)
- Muddy Waters (1913–1983) – electric blues and Chicago blues musician (Jug's Corner, Issaquena County, Mississippi)
- Jim Weatherly (1943–2021) – country and pop singer-songwriter (Pontotoc)
- Carl Weathersby (1953–2024) – blues vocalist, guitarist, songwriter (Jackson)
- Boogie Bill Webb (1924–1990) – blues guitarist and singer (Jackson)
- Leo Welch (1932–2017) – gospel blues singer and guitarist (Sabougla)
- Bukka White (1909–1977) – Delta blues guitarist and singer (Houston)
- Carson Whitsett (1945–2007) – keyboardist, arranger, and songwriter (Jackson)
- Tim Whitsett (1943–2022) – band leader, songwriter, producer, publisher (Jackson)
- Webb Wilder (born 1954) – country/surf music/rock & roll musician (Hattiesburg)
- Robert Wilkins (1896–1987) – blues guitarist and vocalist (Hernando)
- Big Joe Williams (1903–1982) – delta blues musician and songwriter (near to Crawford)
- Hayley Williams (born 1988) – pop punk and alternative rock singer-songwriter (Meridian)
- Lee Williams (1946–2021) – gospel musician (Tupelo, Mississippi)
- Sonny Boy Williamson II (1912–1965) – blues harmonica player and singer-songwriter (Money)
- Eddie Willis (1936–2018) – electric guitarist (Grenada)
- Al Wilson (1939–2008) – singer and drummer (Meridian)
- Cassandra Wilson (born 1955) – jazz singer-songwriter (Jackson)
- Elder Roma Wilson (1910–2018) – harmonica player (Blue Springs)
- Mary Wilson (1944–2021) – singer and founding member of The Supremes (Greenville)
- Andrew Wood (1966–1990) – singer-songwriter and front man for Seattle-area bands Malfunkshun and Mother Love Bone (Columbus)
- Johnny Woods (1917–1990) – blues singer and harmonica player (Looxahoma).
- Charlie Worsham (born 1985) – country singer-songwriter (Grenada)
- Tammy Wynette (1942–1998) – country music singer-songwriter (Tremont)
- Lester Young (1909–1959) – jazz tenor saxophonist and clarinetist (Woodville)
- Zora Young (born 1948) – blues singer (West Point)

== See also ==
- List of people from Mississippi
- Lists of musicians
