= Indestructible (Four Tops album) =

- One of two covers released simultaneously by Arista in different markets and formats; the other features the band in matching vermilion suits pointing to the camera

Studio album by Four Tops
- Released: August 25, 1988
- Studios: Le Gonks West, West Hollywood, USA; Ocean Way, Hollywood, USA; Mama Jo's, North Hollywood, USA; Lion's Share, Los Angeles, USA; Westlake, Los Angeles, USA; Monkey Dust, Los Angeles, USA; Tarpan, San Rafael, USA; Studio D, Sausalito, USA; Fantasy, Berkeley, USA; Soundworks, Las Vegas, USA; United Sound, Detroit, USA; The Farm, Surrey, UK
- Genre: Soul
- Length: 44:53
- Label: Arista
- Producers: Steve Barri; Phil Collins; Lamont Dozier; Albert Hammond; Jerry Knight; Huey Lewis; Tony Peluso; Bobby Sandstrom; Narada Michael Walden; Aaron Zigman

Four Tops chronology
Magic (1985)	Indestructible (1988)	Christmas Here with You (1995)

Indestructible is the twenty-third studio album by American soul music vocal group the Four Tops. The album was released on August 25, 1988, their sole release on Arista Records.

== Recording and release ==
Four Tops joined Motown in the mid-1960s and had several hits before leaving the following decade and experiencing a period of commercial and critical decline. After performing on the television special Motown 25: Yesterday, Today, Forever and collaborating with fellow Motown artists The Temptations on a subsequent tour, the Tops resigned to their first label. They were also able to reunite songwriting team Holland–Dozier–Holland to produce one of their 1980s Motown albums and worked with other 1960s collaborators like Willie Hutch and Smokey Robinson. The group re-entered the studio in 1986 with producer David Wolfert, who had previously produced them in many non-Motown releases. Despite working on the release for several months and issuing the single "Hot Nights" in July, the sessions did not result in a new album and the group signed to Arista Records in 1987. This would be the only album the group released with Arista; the song "Loco in Acapulco" appeared on the soundtrack to the film Buster and the group dueted with Aretha Franklin on her album Through the Storm on this label.

== Reception ==
Professional ratings
Review scores
Source	Rating
AllMusic	3/5 stars

A brief review in Ebony recommended this album as a "sizzling set" and asked readers to "listen and marvel at the genius displayed". Editors at AllMusic Guide scored this release three out of five stars, with reviewer Ron Wynn noting that Levi Stubbs' vocals remain strong late into the group's career. The 1992 edition of The Rolling Stone Album Guide also rated this release three out of five stars.

== Track listing ==
1. "Indestructible" (Michael Price and Bobby Sandstrom) – 4:32
2. "Change of Heart" (Paul Kelly) – 4:50
3. "If Ever a Love There Was" (Todd Cerney and Pamela Phillips Oland) – 4:48
4. "The Sun Ain’t Gonna Shine" (Albert Hammond and Diane Warren) – 5:01
5. "Next Time" (Eric Lowen and William Peterkin) – 3:19
6. "Loco in Acapulco" (Phil Collins and Lamont Dozier) – 4:35
7. "Are You with Me" (Mike Duke, Sean Hopper and Huey Lewis) – 4:46
8. "I’m Only Wounded" (Hammond and Warren) – 3:34
9. "When You Dance" (Jeffrey Cohen and Narada Michael Walden) – 5:09
10. "Let’s Jam" (Steve Bogard and Rick Giles) – 4:20

2013 SoulMusic Records deluxe edition bonus tracks

11. "The Four of Us" (Lawrence Payton) – 4:13
12. "Loco in Acapulco" (Body Mix) – 4:24
13. "Loco in Acapulco" (Ph Dub) – 6:45
14. "Loco in Acapulco" (Ph Balance Mix – Full Version) – 9:08
15. "Indestructible" (Extended Mix) – 7:43

== Personnel ==
Four Tops

- Renaldo Benson – bass vocals
- Abdul Fakir – first tenor vocals
- Lawrence Payton – second tenor and second lead vocals
- Levi Stubbs – lead baritone vocals

Musicians and additional personnel

- Bobby Sandstrom – keyboards (1), arrangements (1)
- Walter Afanasieff – keyboards (2, 4, 9), Moog Modular bass (4, 9)
- Ren Klyce – Fairlight CMI (2, 4)
- Aaron Zigman – keyboards (3, 6), all instruments (5, 8), rhythm arrangements (6)
- Sean Hopper – keyboards (7), arrangements (7)
- Sterling Smith – Roland Juno keyboard horns (9)
- Jim Lang – keyboards (10), synthesizers (10), drum programming (10), arrangements (10)
- Steve Barri – additional synthesizers (10)
- Tony Peluso – additional synthesizers (10), arrangements (10)
- Michael Landau – guitars (1, 6)
- Corrado Rustici – MIDI rhythm guitar (2)
- Vernon "Ice" Black – rhythm guitar (4)
- Paul Jackson Jr. – guitars (6)
- David Williams – guitars (6)
- Johnny Colla – guitars (7)
- Chris Hayes – guitars (7)
- Joe Satriani– rhythm guitar (9), guitar solo (9)
- Dann Huff – guitars (10)
- Jeff Steele – bass (1)
- Randy Jackson – Moog bass (2, 9)
- Jerry Knight – bass (3), all instruments (5, 8)
- Freddie Washington – bass (6)
- Mario Cipollina – bass (7)
- Albert Hammond – additional bass (8), additional drums (8)
- John Robinson – drums (1, 3)
- Bongo Bob Smith – E-mu SP-12 percussion programming (2, 4, 9), drum sampling (2, 4, 9)
- Narada Michael Walden – arrangements (2, 4, 9), drums (4, 9)
- Gigi Gonaway – cymbals (2, 4), hi-hat (2)
- Phil Collins – drums (6), additional backing vocals (6)
- Bill Gibson – drums (7)
- Freddy Alwag – drum augmentation (10)
- Kenny G – saxophone solo (3)
- Clarence Clemons – saxophone solo (4)
- Larry Williams – saxophone solo (8)
- Richard Elliot – saxophone (10)
- Lamont Dozier – rhythm arrangements (6)
- Paul Riser – horn and string arrangements (6)
- Smokey Robinson – additional lead vocals (1)
- Jim Gilstrap – additional backing vocals (2, 4)
- Phillip Ingram – additional backing vocals (2, 4)
- Claytoven Richardson – additional backing vocals (2, 4, 9)
- Aretha Franklin – lead duet vocals (3)
- Kitty Beethoven – additional backing vocals (4)
- Joe Turano – additional backing vocals (4)
- Huey Lewis and the News – additional backing vocals (7)

== Production ==
- Clive Davis – executive producer
- Steve Barri – executive producer (1), producer (10)
- Bobby Sandstrom – producer (1)
- Narada Michael Walden – producer (2, 4, 9)
- Aaron Zigman – producer (3, 5), additional production (8)
- Jerry Knight – producer (3, 5), additional production (8)
- Phil Collins – producer (6)
- Lamont Dozier – producer (6)
- Huey Lewis – producer (7)
- Albert Hammond – producer (8)
- Tony Peluso – producer (10)
- Julie Barri – production coordinator (1, 10)
- Gail Pierson – production coordinator (1, 10)
- Margery Greenspan – art direction
- JM – design
- David Katzenstein – photography
- Andrew Macpherson – front cover photography

Technical

- Greg Calbi – mastering at Sterling Sound (New York, NY)
- Bobby Sandstrom – engineer (1)
- Terry Christian – engineer (1)
- Tony Peluso – engineer (1)
- Erik Zobler – engineer (1), mix engineer (1)
- David Frazer – recording (2, 4, 9), mixing (2, 4, 9)
- Daren Klein – engineer (3, 5), mixing (3, 5)
- Rick Ruggieri – engineer (6)
- Reggie Dozier – mixing (6)
- Robert Missbach – recording (7), mixing (7)
- Mick Guzauski – engineer (8), mixing (8)
- Tony Peluso – recording (10), mixing (10)
- Mitch Gibson – second engineer (1)
- Dana Jon Chappelle – assistant engineer (2, 4, 9)
- Bryan Haggerty – additional vocal engineer (2)
- Wally Buck – assistant engineer (7)
- Jim "Watts" Vereecke – assistant engineer (7)
- Debbie Johnson – assistant engineer (10)

== Chart performance ==
Indestructible peaked at 149 on the Billboard 200 and reached 66 on the R&B charts. The album also spent 10 weeks on the German charts, peaking at 33. The single of the title track reached 35 on the Hot 100 and 57 on the R&B charts; the followup single, "If Ever a Love There Was" subsequently reached 31 on the R&B chart.

== See also ==
- List of 1988 albums
