= Music of Mississippi =

Mississippi is best known as the home of the blues which developed among the freed African Americans in the latter half of the 19th century and beginning 20th century. The Delta blues is the style most closely associated with the state, and includes performers like Charley Patton, Robert Johnson (buried in Greenwood, MS), David "Honeyboy" Edwards, Willie Brown, Tommy Johnson, Ishmon Bracey, Bo Carter, Sam Chatmon, Mississippi John Hurt, Furry Lewis, Son House, Skip James, Muddy Waters, Howlin' Wolf, John Lee Hooker, Pinetop Perkins, Albert King and B.B. King.

== Country ==
The fiddle and banjo are common folk instruments in Mississippi, which has also seen some development as a gospel, country music, and Appalachian folk music center. Country blues artist Robert Wilkins and Songster Jim Jackson of Hernando made influential recordings in the late 1920s-1930s. The Leake County Revelers' brand of folk music saw some national popularity late in the 1930s, at around the same time as Mississippi native Jimmie Rodgers innovated modern country music. McComb was the birthplace of Bo Diddley (d.2008), a highly influential early rock and roll artist.

== Soul/R&B ==
R&B singer Rufus Thomas was born in Cayce. James Carr, Otis Clay, Dorothy Moore, Denise Lasalle and Wiilie Mitchell were from Mississippi. Electric blues singer and guitarist Little Milton was born in Inverness. Soul singer and songwriter Jerry Butler was born in Sunflower. Mississippi was also home to Malaco Records, a well-known indie R&B label. Record producers such as Quin Ivy and Quinton Claunch were from Mississippi also.

== Rock/pop ==
Elvis Presley from Tupelo, had 18 No. 1 hits in the U.S. from 1956 to 1969. Jimmy Buffett was born in Pascagoula, MS and graduated from the University of Southern Mississippi in 1969. Southern rock band North Mississippi Allstars formed in Hernando in 1996. Alternative rock band 3 Doors Down, known for "Kryptonite" are from Escatawpa. They had two No. 1 albums on the Billboard 200 chart, such as 3 Doors Down in 2008. The post-grunge band Saving Abel, known for "Addicted", formed in Corinth. The trap duo Rae Sremmurd from Tupelo had a No. 1 Billboard Hot 100 hit with "Black Beatles" in 2016. The Mississippi Coliseum in Jackson is one of the most famous music venues in the state, since it opened in 1962 and has hosted a few MS musicians from Presley to 3 Doors Down.

== Jug band ==
Gus Cannon, born in Red Banks, helped popularize jug bands in the 1920-1930s with his "Jug Stompers".

== Delta blues ==
The Delta blues is often regarded as the most rootsy or traditional style of the blues, or as the ultimate origins of the blues. The style has also been called the "most influential form of rural blues (with an) eerie, sometimes demonic power that is unmatched by other American acoustic music". Many of these performers recorded in the early 20th century; however, by the 1950s, they were largely forgotten outside of Mississippi. Many moved to Chicago, and became a part of the more mainstream Chicago blues scene.

In the 1960s, however, a roots revival began across the United States, and interest in Mississippi's blues musicians increased.

== Jazz ==
Jazz tenor saxophonist Lester Young was born in Woodville. Double-bassist Milt Hinton and pianist Hank Jones were born in Vicksburg. Blues and jazz pianist Mose Allison was born in Tippo. Alto saxophonist and bandleader Jimmie Lunceford was born in Fulton. Alto saxophonist Captain John Handy was born in Pass Christian. Tenor saxophonist Teddy Edwards, drummer Freddie Waits, trumpeter Charlie Allen, and singer Cassandra Wilson were born in Jackson. Trumpeter Gerald Wilson was born in Shelby. Jazz and blues cornetist, guitarist, and singer Olu Dara was born in Natchez. Tenor saxophonist Brew Moore was born in Indianola. Trumpeter and composer Wadada Leo Smith was born in Leland. Tenor saxophonist Frank Wright was born in Grenada. Drummer Charles "Bobo" Shaw was born in Pope. Pianist and singer Cleo Patra Brown and drummer Alvin Fielder were born in Meridian. Pianist and composer Mulgrew Miller and double bassist Eddie Jones were born in Greenwood. Trumpeter and cornetist Bobby Bradford was born in Cleveland. The International Sweethearts of Rhythm formed in Piney Woods.

== Hip hop ==
The hip hop scene of Mississippi includes performers such as Dear Silas, and many more. Justin Scott (born August 26, 1986), better known by his stage name Big K.R.I.T., is a hip hop musician and record producer from Meridian.

Lavell Crump (born April 11, 1973), better known by the stage name David Banner, is a rapper, record producer and occasional actor. Banner was born in Jackson and graduated from Southern University. He started his music career as a member of the rap duo Crooked Lettaz before going solo in 2000 with Them Firewater Boyz, Vol. 1 and signed to Universal Records in 2003. With Universal, Banner released four albums: Mississippi: The Album (2003), MTA2: Baptized in Dirty Water (2004), Certified (2005), and The Greatest Story Ever Told (2008).

Nate Dogg (August 19, 1969 – March 15, 2011) was born in Clarksdale and lived there until age 14. He is known as a member of the group 213 and for his many collaborations including being featured on 50 Cent's No. 1 Hot 100 hit "21 Questions" in 2003.

== Classical ==
Classical composer William Grant Still was born in Woodville. Samuel Jones was born in Inverness.

== Opera ==
Opera soprano Leontyne Price, who rose to international acclaim in the 1950s-1960s, was born in Laurel.

== See also ==
- Mississippi Musicians Hall of Fame in the Jackson–Evers International Airport
- Mississippi Blues Trail
