= Ralph Williams (politician) =

Mississippi politician

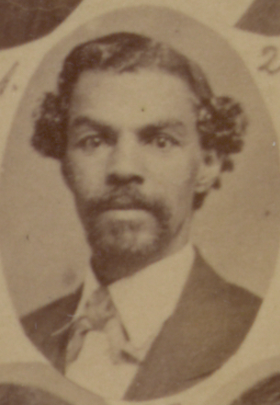
- Occupation: Politician

Ralph Williams (fl. 1870s) was a magistrate and state legislator in Mississippi. He was documented as having been enslaved from birth. He established a wagon manufacturing business in Lamar, Mississippi, after the end of the American Civil War in 1866. He served as a magistrate from 1871 until 1873 when he served in the Mississippi House of Representatives from 1873–1875 for Marshall County, Mississippi.

== See also ==
- African American officeholders from the end of the Civil War until before 1900
