= Rendo =

Rendo is a surname. Notable persons with that name include:

- Alberto Rendo (born 1940), Argentine footballer
- Carlos Rendo (born 1964), American attorney and politician
- Eric Rendo, a player on the 2016 Uruguay national rugby league team
- Fabián Rendo, an actor in the film Cacería and the telenovela Malparida
- Mario Rendo, Sicilian entrepreneur associated with Benedetto Santapaola

== See also ==
- Rendon (disambiguation)
