= Loco in Acapulco =

1988 single by the Four Tops

Single by The Four Tops

from the album Indestructible and Buster: The Original Motion Picture Soundtrack
- Released: November 14, 1988
- Genre: R&B; soul
- Label: Arista; Virgin
- Songwriters: Phil Collins; Lamont Dozier
- Producers: Phil Collins; Lamont Dozier

The Four Tops singles chronology
"Indestructible" (1988)	"Loco in Acapulco" (1988)	"The Sun Ain't Gonna Shine" (1989)

"Loco in Acapulco" is a song by American vocal group the Four Tops, released as a single in 1988. It was written and produced by Phil Collins (who played drums on the track and sang backing vocals) and Lamont Dozier (one third of the group's Motown long-time songwriting team, Holland–Dozier–Holland), for the soundtrack to the film Buster, that also starred Collins in the title role.

It was released on Arista Records and became an international hit, reaching number 7 in the UK chart, and number 9 in the Netherlands. The song did not chart in the U.S., as it was issued as the B-side to "Change of Heart", when it was released as a single in the US during 1989. The song is about partying and having fun in the Mexican city of Acapulco. The song subsequently appeared on the Four Tops' 1988 studio album, Indestructible.

== Charts ==
Chart (1988)	Peak position
Belgium (Ultratop)	13
Germany (Media Control Charts)	23
Italy Airplay (Music & Media)	11
Netherlands (Dutch Top 40)	9
UK Singles Chart	7

== Certifications ==
Region	Certification	Certified units/sales
United Kingdom (BPI)	Silver	200,000^{‡}
^{‡} Sales+streaming figures based on certification alone.

== Personnel ==
- Levi Stubbs – lead vocals
- Renaldo Benson, Abdul Fakir, Lawrence Payton – backing vocals
- David Williams, Michael Landau, Paul Jackson Jr. – guitar
- Aaron Zigman – keyboards
- Freddie Washington – bass
- Paul Riser – horn and string arrangements
- Phil Collins – producer, songwriting, drums, additional vocals
- Lamont Dozier – producer, songwriting, rhythm arrangements
