= Sabougla Voices =

Studio album by Leo Welch
- Released: January 6, 2014
- Recorded: Summer 2013
- Genre: Delta blues, gospel blues, country blues
- Length: 33:31
- Label: Big Legal Mess
- Producer: Bruce Watson

Leo Welch chronology
Sabougla Voices (2014)	I Don't Prefer No Blues (2015)

Sabougla Voices is the first studio album by Leo Welch. Big Legal Mess Records released the album on January 6, 2014. Welch worked with Bruce Watson, in the production of this album.

The album's title is a reference to Welch's birthplace of Sabougla, Mississippi.

== Critical reception ==
Professional ratings
Review scores
Source	Rating
AllMusic	4/5 stars
Cross Rhythms	9/10 squares
PopMatters	6/10 stars

Awarding the album four stars from AllMusic, Steve Leggett states, "Welch has found a way to make the blues and gospel speak together in one voice." David Maine, giving the album six stars at PopMatters, writes, "Recommended for any blues fan who isn’t afraid of overtly devotional material." Rating the album a nine out of ten for Cross Rhythms, Lins Honeyman says, "Every once in a while, the blues world throws up a surprise discovery that proves that the unrefined, down home strand of the genre embodied by past masters such as Son House, Charley Patton and Lightnin' Hopkins has a flame that still flickers even today."

== Track listing ==
Track list
No.	Title	Length
1.	"Praise His Name"	3:50
2.	"You Can't Hurry God"	2:22
3.	"Me and My Lord"	3:46
4.	"Take Care of Me Lord"	3:46
5.	"Mother Loves Her Children"	3:13
6.	"Praying Time"	4:37
7.	"Somebody Touched Me"	3:27
8.	"A Long Journey"	3:13
9.	"His Holy Name"	3:33
10.	"The Lord Will Make a Way"	1:44
Total length:		33:31
