= Roger Manning (disambiguation) =

Roger Manning may refer to:

- Roger Manning, American anti-folk singer
- Roger Joseph Manning, Jr. (born 1966), keyboardist
- Roger Manning, a fictional character of Tom Corbett, Space Cadet, played by actor Jan Merlin in the TV series
