= Two Hearts (Phil Collins song) =

1988 single by Phil Collins

Single by Phil Collins

from the album Buster: The Original Motion Picture Soundtrack
- B-side: "The Robbery"
- Released: 14 November 1988
- Genre: Pop; soul
- Length: 3:23
- Label: Atlantic; Virgin; WEA
- Composer: Lamont Dozier
- Lyricist: Phil Collins
- Producers: Phil Collins; Lamont Dozier

Phil Collins singles chronology
"A Groovy Kind of Love" (1988)	"Two Hearts" (1988)	"Another Day in Paradise" (1989)

Music video
- "Phil Collins - Two Hearts (Official Music Video)" on YouTube

"Two Hearts" is a song by the English singer Phil Collins from the soundtrack to the film Buster (1988) where it features in the end credits, in which Collins played the lead role of Buster Edwards. Released on 14 November 1988, "Two Hearts" topped the charts in the United States and Canada; in the former country, the song stayed at number one on the Billboard Hot 100 for two weeks and the Billboard Adult Contemporary chart for five weeks. It also reached number six on the UK Singles Chart.

"Two Hearts" won the Golden Globe Award for Best Original Song (tying with "Let the River Run" by Carly Simon from Working Girl) and the Grammy Award for Best Song Written Specifically for a Motion Picture or Television in 1989.

== Background ==
"Two Hearts" was composed by Lamont Dozier of Motown's Holland-Dozier-Holland (who also co-composed the music for the Supremes hit "You Can't Hurry Love", which Collins covered in 1982), with lyrics by Collins, both of whom also produced this song for the crime comedy film Buster (1988). Both singles for the film, "Two Hearts" and "A Groovy Kind of Love", topped the US charts. Collins originally wanted Dozier to exclusively handle the music for the Buster film so that he could primarily focus on acting. Upon hearing the demo of "Two Hearts" that Dozier prepared, Collins agreed to perform on the song and supplement it with lyrics.

The song was used to open the inaugural broadcast of the radio station BBC Hereford and Worcester on 14 February 1989 (Valentine's Day).

== Music video ==
Two music videos were made, both directed by Jim Yukich and produced by Paul Flattery. The first one was similar to Collins' 1982 video "You Can't Hurry Love" featuring Collins as all four members in a band (named "The Four Pound Notes") and a cameo appearance by British DJ Tony Blackburn. The other featured him in a wrestling match against the Ultimate Warrior, which was featured on the Jim Yukich-directed, Paul Flattery-produced Seriously.. Phil Collins CBS TV special (aired 8 September 1990). Gilbert Gottfried, Vanessa Williams and Jeffrey Tambor also appear in this version. The special can be found on the 2004 First Final Farewell Tour DVD.

== Awards ==
Year	Award	Category	Recipient	Result	Ref.
1989	Academy Awards	Best Original Song	Phil Collins and Lamont Dozier	Nominated	
1989	Golden Globe Awards	Best Original Song	Phil Collins and Lamont Dozier	Won	
1989	Grammy Awards	Best Song Written Specifically for a Motion Picture or Television	Phil Collins and Lamont Dozier	Won	

== Track listings ==
7-inch single

1. "Two Hearts" – 3:24
2. "The Robbery" - London Film Orchestra, conducted by Anne Dudley (edit) – 3:18

12-inch maxi

1. "Two Hearts" – 3:23
2. "The Robbery" - London Film Orchestra, conducted by Anne Dudley (full length) – 7:20

== Charts ==
=== Weekly charts ===
Chart (1988–1989)	Peak position
Australia (ARIA)	13
Austria (Ö3 Austria Top 40)	14
Belgium (Ultratop 50 Flanders)	3
Canada Retail Singles (The Record)	1
Canada Top Singles (RPM)	1
Denmark (IFPI)	1
Europe (European Hot 100 Singles)	2
Finland (Suomen virallinen lista)	13
France (SNEP)	24
Ireland (IRMA)	3
Italy Airplay (Music & Media)	5
Netherlands (Dutch Top 40)	5
Netherlands (Single Top 100)	6
New Zealand (Recorded Music NZ)	21
Norway (VG-lista)	6
Spain (AFYVE)	17
Switzerland (Schweizer Hitparade)	4
UK Singles (Official Charts)	6
UK Airplay (Music & Media)	1
US Billboard Hot 100	1
US Adult Contemporary (Billboard)	1
West Germany (GfK)	3

=== Year-end charts ===
Chart (1988)	Position
UK Singles (OCC)	53

Chart (1989)	Position
Australia (ARIA)	65
Belgium (Ultratop)	76
Canada Top Singles (RPM)	14
US Billboard Hot 100	20
US Adult Contemporary (Billboard)	3
West Germany (Media Control)	34

== Certifications ==
Region	Certification	Certified units/sales
United Kingdom (BPI)	Silver	200,000^{‡}
^{‡} Sales+streaming figures based on certification alone.

== Personnel ==
- Phil Collins – vocals, keyboards, drums
- Michael Landau – guitars
- Freddie Washington – bass
- Paulinho da Costa – tambourine
- Paul Riser – string arrangements

== See also ==
- List of Hot 100 number-one singles of 1989 (U.S.)
- List of number-one adult contemporary singles of 1988 (U.S.)
