= Floyd Lee =

American blues musician (1933–2020)

- Born: Floyd Lee; August 20, 1933; Lamar, Mississippi, US
- Died: June 7, 2020 (aged 86) Columbus, Ohio, US
- Genre: Blues
- Occupations: Guitarist, singer
- Instruments: Guitar, vocals
- Years active: 1950s–2013

Floyd Lee, also known as Theodore Williams (August 20, 1933 – June 7, 2020), was an American blues musician. A native of Mississippi, Lee traveled around the United States before settling in New York City in 1972. He is best known for his passionate performances of blues music in and around New York's subway stations for almost 30 years, before recording four albums on the Amogla Records label and touring in his later years. "Mean Blues" became one of his more popular numbers.

== Biography ==
Lee was born in Lamar, Mississippi, United States, and he was given away at one month old. As he grew up, Lee picked and chopped cotton during the warmer months and attended school in Memphis, Tennessee, in the winter. Inspired by both his 'father', Guitar Floyd, and near neighbour Guitar Slim, Lee learned to play the guitar. He also heard his 'mother' singing while both working in the cotton fields and homemaking. By age ten, and following the Attack on Pearl Harbor, Lee was first sent to live with relatives in Chicago, Illinois. He relocated with those relatives to Cleveland, Ohio, where he sold newspapers and was a batboy for the Cleveland Indians.

In his teenage years, Lee began as a performer at rent parties. He once met and informally played guitar with Jimmy Reed; the latter having traveled to Cleveland to give a separate solo performance. Lee subsequently worked his way around the North back to Chicago; then Michigan; on to Cleveland and Columbus, Ohio; before eventually settling in Harlem, New York, in 1972. He became immersed in New York's musical culture and started to perform in the train stations, clubs and street festivals in the city. Lee was a founding member of Music Under New York (MUNY), formerly Arts for Transit, and was later a judge on their board. He regularly performed blues music at subway stations, including Times Square and Grand Central Station as an official MUNY musician, a role he undertook for almost 30 years.

Lee also found employment as a doorman for 27 years at the Normandy Apartments on the Upper West Side of Manhattan, New York, before retiring in 1996. He performed at David Dinkins' inauguration as Mayor of New York City in 1990 with Nelson Mandela in attendance. Some sources claimed Lee was a cousin of John Lee Hooker and, as well as Jimmy Reed, he also performed with Wilson Pickett and Bo Diddley.

Although best known for his passionate street performing in New York, in Lee's later years he recorded four albums in the 2000s on the Amogla Records label and toured extensively. He performed at music festivals in France, Switzerland, Japan, North Korea and Russia, in addition to touring across the US.

In 2008, Lee was the main subject matter of a documentary film, Full Moon Lightnin' , where he reconnected with his family in Mississippi after 60 years apart. Full Moon Lightnin' was edited, directed and produced by John C. Gardiner, and released by Willow Tree Pictures. The film won the Living Blues Award in 2009 for Best Blues Documentary in Living Blues readers poll. The film and accompanying compilation album, The Amogla Sessions, saw Lee given assistance by guitarist and songwriter Joel Poluck.

== Death ==
Floyd Lee died on June 7, 2020, at Mount Carmel East in Columbus, Ohio, of heart failure at the age of 86.

== Albums discography ==
Year	Title	Label	CD release date	Reference
2002	Mean Blues	Amogla Records	2008	
2003	Ain't Doin' Nothin' Wrong	Amogla Records	2003	
2004	Full Moon Lightnin'	Amogla Records	2004	
2008	Doctors, Devils & Drugs	Amogla Records	2008	
2009	The Amogla Sessions (compilation album)	Amogla Records	2009	

== See also ==
- List of musicians from Mississippi
