= Out Here on My Own (album) =

Studio album by Lamont Dozier
- Released: 1973
- Studio: ABC, Los Angeles, California
- Genre: Soul
- Length: 37:00
- Label: ABC
- Producer: McKinley Jackson

Lamont Dozier chronology
Out Here on My Own (1973)	Black Bach (1974)

Singles from Out Here On My Own
- 1. "Trying to Hold on to My Woman" Released: 1973; 2. "Fish Ain't Bitin'" Released: 1973

Out Here on My Own is the debut studio album by singer Lamont Dozier released on the ABC label.

== Reception ==
Professional ratings
Review scores
Source	Rating
AllMusic	3/5 stars

Ron Wynn of AllMusic stated "It was one of the better combinations of socio-political commentary and urgent soul vocals done in the period. The title cut, as well as the singles "Fish Ain't Bitin" and "Tryin' To Hold On To My Woman," were sizable hits."

== Chart performance ==
First in December 1973, the album peaked at No. 54 on the Hot Soul albums chart. Its final position was at #17. The single, Trying to Hold on to My Woman, was featured on this album. It reached No. 4 on the U.S. R&B chart and No. 15 on the U.S. pop chart in 1974. The song ranked at No. 87 on Billboard magazine's Top 100 singles of 1974. Another single, "Fish Ain't Bitin'", peaked at No. 26 on the Billboard Hot 100 and No. 4 on the R&B singles chart.

== Track listing ==
Side one
No.	Title	Writer(s)	Length
1.	"Breaking Out All Over"	McKinley Jackson, Althea King	5:03
2.	"Don't Want Nobody to Come Between Us"	Stephen Bowden, M. Jackson, James Reddick	4:20
3.	"Let Me Make Love to You"	M. Jackson, J. Reddick	5:54
4.	"Fish Ain't Bitin'"	M. Jackson, J. Reddick	4:22

Side two
No.	Title	Writer(s)	Length
5.	"Interlude"	M. Jackson	1:30
6.	"Trying to Hold on to My Woman"	M. Jackson, J. Reddick	5:58
7.	"Take Off Your Make Up"	M. Jackson, J. Reddick	4:59
8.	"Out Here On My Own"	M. Jackson, J. Reddick	4:55

== Personnel ==
Adapted from liner notes.

- Arranged By – Gene Page, H.B. Barnum, Paul Riser
- Backing Vocals – Carolyn Willis, Julia Waters Tillman, Maxine Waters Willard, Oren Waters, Jesse Kirkland, Joseph Green
- Bass – Ray Parker Jr., Ronald Brown*, Tony Newton
- Cello – Christine Ermacoff, Douglas Davis, Gloria Strassner, Jesse Ehrlich, Joseph Ditullio
- Contractor – Olivia Page
- Drums – Ed Greene, Zachary Frazier, Zachary Slatter
- Engineer [Recording Engineer] – Barney Perkins, Reginald Dozier
- French Horn – Arthur Maebe, David Duke, Vincent DeRosa
- Guitar – Greg Poreé, Ray Parker Jr., Wah Wah Watson, David T. Walker
- Harp – Gayle Levant, Stella Castellucci
- Mastered By [Disc Mastering Engineer] – Phil Cross
- Percussion – King Errisson
- Photography By – Chris Callis
- Piano – Ernest Vantrease, McKinley Jackson
- Producer – McKinley Jackson
- Saxophone [Sax], Flute, Oboe – Anthony Ortega, Ernest Green, Ernie Watts, Fred Jackson*, John Daversa, John Kelson, Jules Jacob
- Soloist [Sax Solo] – John Kelson
- Trombone – George Bohannon
- Trumpet – Bud Brisbois, Oliver Mitchell*, Oscar Brashear, Warren Roché
- Viola – Allan Harshman, Harry Hyams, Milton Thomas, Philip Goldberg
- Violin – Gerald Vinci, Harry Bluestone, Henry Ferber, Henry Roth, Israel Baker, Jack Shulman, James Getzoff, Jay Rosen, Leonard Malarsky, Nathan Ross, Paul Shure, Spiro Stamos, Stanley Plummer, Tibor Zelig, Bill Kurasch
- Violin, Concertmaster – Sidney Sharp

== Charts ==
Chart (1973)	Peak position
US Top LPs	114
US Soul LPs	17

=== Singles ===
Year	Single	Chart positions	
Year	Single	US	US R&B
1973	"Trying to Hold on to My Woman"	15	4
1973	"Fish Ain't Bitin'"	26	4
