= Trying to Hold on to My Woman =

Single by Lamont Dozier

from the album Out Here on My Own
- B-side: "We Don't Want Nobody to Come Between Us"
- Released: November 1973
- Studio: ABC, Los Angeles, California
- Genre: Soul
- Length: 4:24
- Label: ABC
- Songwriters: McKinley Jackson, James Reddick
- Producer: McKinley Jackson

Lamont Dozier singles chronology
"Dearest One" (1962)	"Trying to Hold on to My Woman" (1973)	"Fish Ain't Bitin'" (1974)

"Trying to Hold on to My Woman" is a song written by McKinley Jackson and James Reddick and performed by Lamont Dozier. It reached No. 4 on the U.S. R&B chart and No. 15 on the U.S. pop chart in 1974. It was featured on his 1973 album Out Here on My Own.

The song was arranged by Gene Page and produced by McKinley Jackson.

The song ranked No. 87 on Billboard magazine's Top 100 singles of 1974.

== Charts ==
Chart (1974)	Peak position
Canada Top Singles (RPM)	43
US Billboard Hot 100	15
US Hot R&B/Hip-Hop Songs (Billboard)	4

== Other charting versions ==
- Garland Green released version of the song entitled "Tryin' to Hold On" as a single in 1983 which reached No. 63 on the U.S. R&B chart.
