= Garland Green =

American soul singer and pianist (1942–2026)

- Born: Garfield Green Jr. June 14, 1942; Dunleith, Mississippi, U.S.
- Died: February 2026 (aged 83)
- Genre: Soul
- Occupation: Singer
- Instrument: Vocals
- Years active: 1967–201?
- Labels: Revue, Uni, Cotillion, Spring, RCA, Ocean-Front

Garland Green (born Garfield Green Jr.; June 14, 1942 – February 2026) was an American soul singer and pianist.

== Life and career ==
Born in Dunleith, Mississippi, United States on June 14, 1942, Green was the tenth child of eleven in his family. He lived in Mississippi until 1958 when he moved to Chicago. While working and attending Englewood High, he sang on weekends, and one day while singing in a pool room, he was overheard by Argia B. Collins, a local owner of a barbeque chain. Collins agreed to bankroll Green's attendance at the Chicago Conservatory of Music, where Green studied voice and piano, and played in local bars and clubs.

In 1967, Green won a local talent show at a club called the Trocadero. His prize was a concert opening for Lou Rawls and Earl Hines at the Sutherland Lounge. In the audience was Mel Collins, and his wife Joshie Jo Armstead, who was a songwriter who had written tunes with Nick Ashford and Valerie Simpson prior to the couple joining Motown. The couple arranged for Green to do a recording session in Detroit and released the result as a single on their label, Gamma Records, a song called "Girl I Love You", written by Shelley Fisher. It sold well locally and was picked up by MCA subsidiary, Revue Records for national distribution. Revue released three further singles from Green who then moved to MCA's main label, Uni Records.

In 1969, "Jealous Kind of Fella" became a major national success, reaching No. 5 in the Billboard R&B chart, No. 2 in the Cashbox soul chart, and No. 24 in Canada. Written by Green, R. Browner, M. Dollinson and Jo Armstead, the record was released in the US in August 1969. It sold a million copies by March 1971. Uni released an album from Green, but the follow-up single did not sell well and Green eventually left MCA, also parting company with Armstead. He then signed with Atlantic Records subsidiary, Cotillion Records, which released five singles from Garland, but only one proved a real success, "Plain and Simple Girl". Produced and arranged by Donny Hathaway, this reached the R&B Top 20.

Moving on to Spring Records in 1973, Green recorded five more singles, some of which charted modestly, notably "Let the Good Times Roll" (not the Shirley and Lee song) and "Bumpin' and Stompin'." His recording for the label, "Just What The Doctor Ordered", remained unissued until 1990, when it was included on a compilation album of his Spring singles on the UK label, Ace/Kent. A move then to RCA Records resulted in three singles and an album, produced by the Los Angeles, California producer/singer Leon Haywood.

In 1979, Green moved to California, and eventually signed with a small independent label, Ocean-Front Records for an album produced by Lamont Dozier and Arleen Schesel, the latter of whom Green later married. The album featured a re-worked version of a major hit for Dozier 10 years earlier, "Trying to Hold on to My Woman". When the label closed, Green continued to record and self-release. In 2011, Green signed a deal for a brand new album with Special Soul Music, a new division of the label CDS Records. The album, entitled I Should've Been The One, was released February 2012. It was his first album of new material in 29 years.

Green's death at the age of 83 was announced on February 9, 2026.

== Discography ==
=== Chart singles ===
Year	Song	US	U.S. R&B
1969	"Jealous Kind of Fella"	20	5
1970	"Don't Think That I'm a Violent Guy"	113	42
1971	"Plain and Simple Girl"	109	17
1974	"He Didn't Know (He Kept On Talking)"	—	67
1974	"Sweet Loving Woman"	—	72
1974	"Let the Good Times Roll"	—	65
1975	"Bumpin' And Stompin'"	—	72
1977	"Don't Let Love Walk Out On Us" / "Ask Me For What You Want"	—	93
1983	"Tryin' to Hold On"	—	63

=== Albums ===
- Jealous Kind of Fella (Uni 1969)
- Love Is What We Came Here For (RCA 1977)
- Garland Green (Ocean Front 1983)
- The Spring Sides (Kent 1990)
- The Very Best Of (Kent UK 2008)
- I Should've Been The One (Special Soul 2012)
