= Rendon (surname) =

Rendon or Rendón is a surname. Notable people with the surname include:

- Ana Rendón (born 1986), Colombian archer
- Andrés Rendón, Colombian karateka
- Anthony Rendon (born 1990), American baseball player
- Anthony Rendon (politician), American politician
- Daniel Rendón Herrera, Colombian drug trafficker
- Del Rendon (1965–2005), American musician
- Diego Luis Rendón Urrea (born 1967), Colombian Roman Catholic bishop
- Estanislao Rendón (1806-1874), Venezuelan politician
- James Rendón (born 1985), Colombian racewalker
- John Toro Rendón (born 1958), Colombian football referee
- Juan José Rendón (born 1964), Venezuelan publicist
- Manuel Rendón Seminario (1894–1982), Ecuadorian painter
- María Chacón Rendón, Bolivian lawyer and politician
- Marianne Rendón, American actress
- Valentina Rendón (born 1975), Colombian actress and singer
