= I Don't Prefer No Blues =

Studio album by Leo Bud Welch
- Released: March 24, 2015
- Genre: Delta blues, gospel blues, country blues
- Length: 35:12
- Label: Big Legal Mess
- Producer: King Louie Bankston, Jimbo Mathus, Bronson Tew, Bruce Watson

Leo Bud Welch chronology
Sabougla Voices (2014)	I Don't Prefer No Blues (2015)	Live at The Iridium (2017)

I Don't Prefer No Blues is the second studio album by Leo Bud Welch. Big Legal Mess Records released the album on March 24, 2015. Welch worked with King Louie Bankston, Jimbo Mathus, Bronson Tew, and Bruce Watson, in the production of this album.

== Critical reception ==
Professional ratings
Review scores
Source	Rating
AllMusic	4.5/5 stars
Blurt Magazine	4/5 stars
Cross Rhythms	8/10 squares
PopMatters	8/10 stars

Awarding the album four and a half stars from AllMusic, Thom Jurek states, "Welch has given us a blues album for the ages." Michael Toland, giving the album four stars at Blurt Magazine, writes, "It's not just the North Mississippi sound that's in good hands with Welch – it's the blues in general." Rating the album eight stars for PopMatters, Ben Child says, "Pound for pound, track for track, Welch latches onto the stringent intensity of the hill country blues but lets go of the ramshackle." Lins Honeyman, indicating in an eight out of ten review by Cross Rhythms, replies, "Welch does it in style."

== Track listing ==
Track list
No.	Title	Length
1.	"Poor Boy"	2:07
2.	"Girl In the Holler"	3:46
3.	"I Don't Know Her Name"	2:45
4.	"Goin' Down Slow"	4:12
5.	"Cadillac Baby"	2:46
6.	"Too Much Wine"	3:04
7.	"I Woke Up"	4:51
8.	"So Many Turnrows"	4:06
9.	"Pray On"	3:48
10.	"Sweet Black Angel"	3:47
Total length:		35:12
