= Rendon =

Rendon may refer to:

- Rendon, Texas, a census-designated place in Tarrant County, Texas
- Rendon Group, a public relations firm that has assisted a number of U.S. military activities
- Rendon (surname)
