= Hayes McMullan =

American songwriter

- Born: January 29, 1902; New Hope or Murphreesboro, Tallahatchie County, Mississippi, U.S.
- Died: May 1986 (aged 84) Tutwiler, Mississippi
- Genres: Delta blues
- Occupation(s): Musician, songwriter
- Instrument(s): Vocals, guitar
- Years active: 1920s–1930s; 1960s

Hayes McMullan (January 29, 1902 – May 1986) was an American Delta blues singer, guitarist and songwriter. He was also employed at various times as a sharecropper and as a deacon and was a civil rights activist.

McMullan's first major recorded work was released in February 2017, over 30 years after his death, and was drawn from recordings he made in 1967 and 1968 in Tallahatchie County, Mississippi.

== Biography ==
McMullan was born in either New Hope or Murphreesboro, Tallahatchie County, Mississippi. His musical talents were unearthed following a chance encounter in 1967 between McMullan and the American roots scholar, music collector and documentarian Gayle Dean Wardlow. Wardlow, striking up a conversation with him, discovered that McMullan had known Wardlow's idol, Charley Patton, and had played alongside him in the 1920s. This was at a time when McMullan had drifted from his Mississippi Delta homeland to perform the blues in juke joints across the Deep South. Wardlow also learned that McMullan had stopped playing the blues when he joined a church in the 1930s. Explaining why he had given up the opportunity to record with Patton, McMullan stated, "They only offered me $5 a song, and you know they could make thousands off just one song." Wardlow's unlikely friendship with McMullan led him to visit McMullan's sharecropper shack in Tallahatchie County, Mississippi, on a number of occasions in the late 1960s, and he recorded McMullan both on tape recorder and in writing. Wardlow wrote at the time that "Hayes was playing like no one I had ever heard."

McMullan died in May 1986, aged 84.

Wardlow subsequently wrote, "The few old snapshots I took, the handful of tunes we recorded, and his brilliant performance of 'Hurry Sundown' captured on film are all that's left of the musical legacy of Hayes McMullan, sharecropper, deacon, and—unbeknownst to so many for so long—reluctant bluesman." Wardlow also transcribed the songs and wrote the sleeve notes for the 2017 release of McMullan's album Everyday Seem Like Murder Here. Another song on the album, "Smoke Like Lightning", later became "Smokestack Lightnin'" as recorded by Howlin' Wolf.

== Album ==
- Everyday Seem Like Murder Here, 2017, Light in the Attic Records (31 tracks)

== See also ==
- List of Delta blues musicians
