= Buster (soundtrack) =

Buster: The Original Motion Picture Soundtrack

Soundtrack album by Various artists
- Released: 19 September 1988
- Recorded: 1988 (Except for "Just One Look", "I Got You Babe", "Keep On Running", "How Do You Do It?", "I Just Don't Know What to Do with Myself" and "Sweets for My Sweet", which were recorded in the 1960s)
- Length: 43:52
- Label: Virgin (UK and Ireland); Atlantic (US and Canada); WEA (Rest of the world)

Phil Collins chronology
12"ers (1987)	Buster: The Original Motion Picture Soundtrack (1988)	...But Seriously (1989)

Singles from Buster: The Original Motion Picture Soundtrack
- 1. "A Groovy Kind of Love" Released: 22 August 1988; 2. "Two Hearts" Released: 14 November 1988; 3. "Loco in Acapulco" Released: 14 November 1988

Buster: The Original Motion Picture Soundtrack is the soundtrack for the 1988 British film Buster. The album was released on September 19, 1988. It is essentially a collection of oldies, tucked in between two Phil Collins songs that were recorded for the film, in which he starred. "Two Hearts" was specially written for the film, having earned a Grammy Award for Best Song Written Specifically for a Motion Picture or Television in 1989, a Golden Globe Award for Best Original Song (tying with "Let the River Run" from Working Girl by Carly Simon) as well as an Academy Award nomination for Best Original Song, and "A Groovy Kind of Love" with a Grammy Award nomination for Best Pop Vocal Performance, Male was a remake of a song taken to #2 in the UK Singles Chart in 1965 by The Mindbenders. Both were released as singles, and topped the Billboard Hot 100 chart, with "A Groovy Kind of Love" also reaching #1 in the UK. Other new songs include Collins' "Big Noise" and Four Tops' "Loco in Acapulco", co-written by Collins. At the Brit Awards in 1989 it won for Soundtrack/Cast Recording, while Collins received the award British Male Artist for his contribution to the soundtrack album.

"Two Hearts" and "A Groovy Kind of Love" were not released on a solo Phil Collins album until 1998's ...Hits - even though both were from the same era as Collins' fourth studio album ...But Seriously - however, live versions appeared on his Serious Hits... Live! album in 1990.

== Track listing ==
Side one
No.	Title	Writer(s)	Length
1.	"Two Hearts"	Phil Collins, Lamont Dozier	3:23
2.	"Gardening by the Book"† "Just One Look"	Doris Troy, Gregory Carroll	0:25; 2:28
3.	"...And I Love Her"† "Big Noise"	Phil Collins, Lamont Dozier	1:30; 3:54
4.	"The Robbery" (instrumental)	Anne Dudley	7:31
5.	"I Got You Babe"	Sonny Bono	3:09
Total length:			22:20

Side two
No.	Title	Writer(s)	Length
1.	"Keep On Running"	Jackie Edwards	2:44
2.	"Alone in Acapulco"† "Loco in Acapulco"	Phil Collins, Lamont Dozier	0:15; 4:11
3.	"How Do You Do It?"	Mitch Murray	1:53
4.	"Thoughts of Home"† "I Just Don't Know What to Do with Myself"	Hal David, Burt Bacharach	0:33; 3:02
5.	"The Good Life"† "Sweets for My Sweet"	Doc Pomus, Mort Shuman	1:02; 2:26
6.	"Will You Still Be Waiting" (instrumental)	Anne Dudley	1:54
7.	"A Groovy Kind of Love"	Toni Wine, Carole Bayer Sager	3:30
Total length:			21:29

Note

- The album actually consists of 17 tracks. † Five tracks are preceded by incidental music performed by The London Film Orchestra and written by Anne Dudley.

CD editions
No.	Title	Writer(s)	Length
1.	"Two Hearts"	Phil Collins, Lamont Dozier	3:23
2.	"Gardening by the Book"† "Just One Look"	Doris Troy, Gregory Carroll	0:25; 2:28
3.	"...And I Love Her"† "Big Noise"	Phil Collins, Lamont Dozier	1:30; 3:54
4.	"The Robbery" (instrumental)	Anne Dudley	7:31
5.	"I Got You Babe"	Sonny Bono	3:09
6.	"Alone in Acapulco"† "Loco in Acapulco"	Phil Collins, Lamont Dozier	0:15; 4:11
7.	"How Do You Do It?"	Mitch Murray	1:53
8.	"Thoughts of Home"† "I Just Don't Know What to Do with Myself"	Hal David, Burt Bacharach	0:33; 3:02
9.	"The Good Life"† "Sweets for My Sweet"	Doc Pomus, Mort Shuman	1:02; 2:26
10.	"Will You Still Be Waiting" (instrumental)	Anne Dudley	1:54
11.	"A Groovy Kind of Love"	Toni Wine, Carole Bayer Sager	3:30
Total length:			41:06

Note

- "Keep On Running" does not appear on the compact disc release (excluding the ones in the US and Canada) for legal reasons.

== Charts ==
Album

Chart (1988–1989)	Position
Australian Albums Chart	35
Austrian Albums Chart	11
Canadian Albums Chart	67
German Albums Chart	4
Swiss Albums Chart	6
UK Albums Chart	6
UK Compilation Chart	2
U.S. Billboard 200	54

Singles

Year	Single	Artist	Chart	Position
1988	"A Groovy Kind of Love"	Phil Collins	Billboard Hot 100	1
1989	"Two Hearts"	Phil Collins	Billboard Hot 100	1

== Certifications ==
Region	Certification	Certified units/sales
Germany (BVMI)	Gold	250,000^{^}
Switzerland (IFPI Switzerland)	Gold	25,000^{^}
United Kingdom (BPI)	3× Platinum	900,000^{^}
United States (RIAA)	Gold	500,000^{^}
^{^} Shipments figures based on certification alone.
