= Music Under New York =

Music program in New York City's transit system

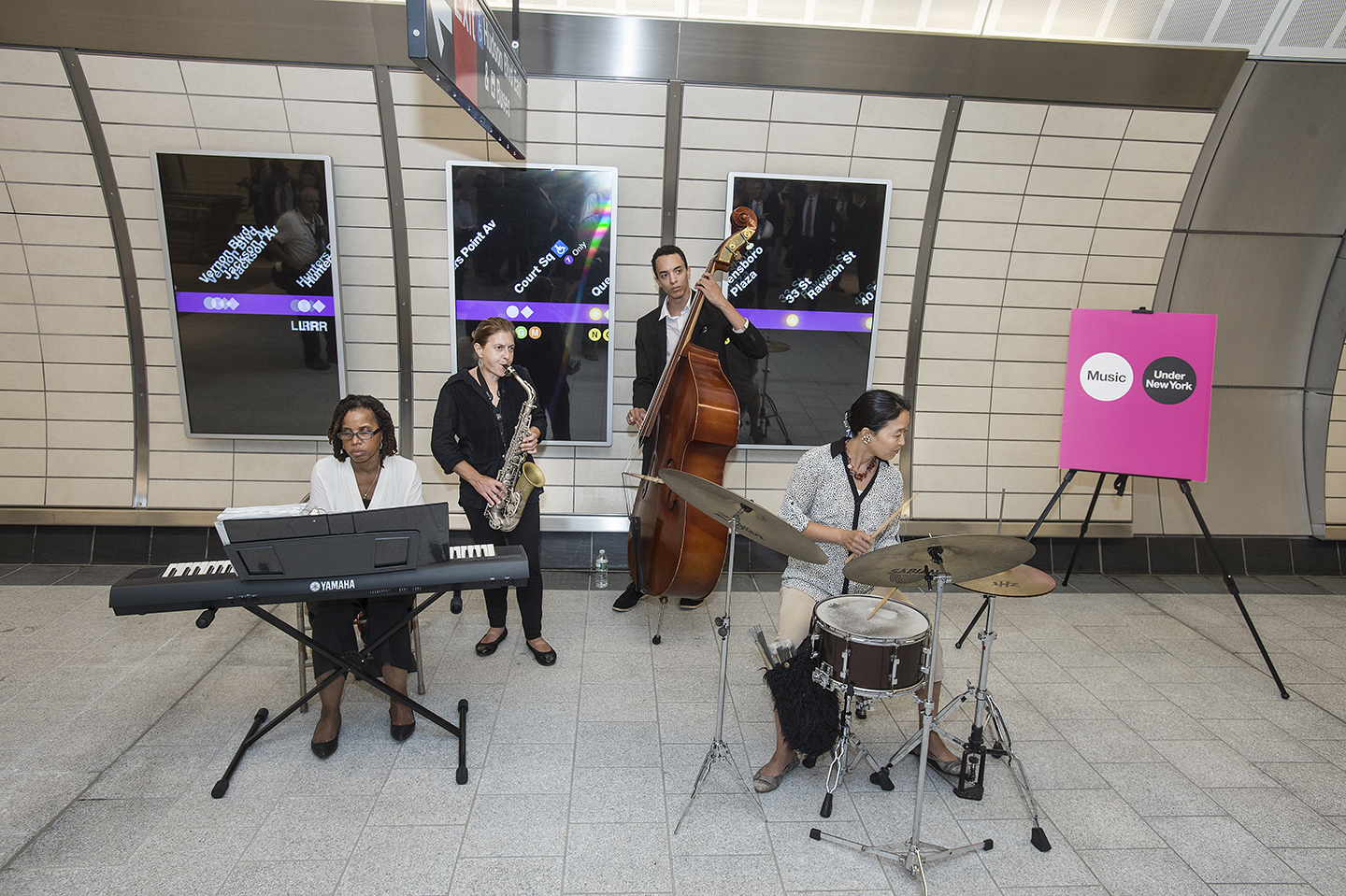
Music Under New York musicians at the 34th Street–Hudson Yards station on Manhattan's West Side

MTA Music (originally Music Under New York; MUNY) is a part of the Arts & Design program by the Metropolitan Transportation Authority (MTA) that schedules musical performances in transportation hubs across its rapid transit, ferry, and commuter rail systems.

MTA grants every musician the legal right to perform, with or without MUNY affiliation. However, MUNY gives particular visibility and promotion to over 350 artists and groups who choose to participate. Artists are chosen through applications and ultimately a live audience with a jury panel. MUNY locations include approximately 30 high-traffic stations operated by the New York City Transit Authority that are part of the New York City Subway, the Long Island Rail Road, Metro-North Railroad, and the Staten Island Ferry.

== History ==
Prohibition of musical performance in the New York City Subway was prevalent since the opening of the first line in 1904. The ban continued under Mayor Fiorello La Guardia, who also made it illegal to perform on New York City streets. Some musicians still sang and played instruments through the 1940s, 1950s and 1960s in an effort to reclaim public space. Finally in 1985, the ban on subway performance was declared unconstitutional following a court challenge by musician Roger Manning, and the MTA created MUNY as a pilot program. The program became official in January 1987.

MUNY had no impact on the legal status of subway performing, as MUNY performers are covered by the same rules governing the general public. However, affiliation with MUNY provides benefits to performers. These include priority scheduling in popular locations, access to commuter railroad terminals, and fewer problems with law enforcement. And, because the MUNY scheduling system rewards its auditioned performers with access to high-traffic areas, it arguably results in a higher-quality artistic product for MTA riders.

In 2026, the MUNY program was officially rebranded MTA Music. In conjunction with this rebranding MTA Music began hosting a "Stations Series" with performances at stations in all five boroughs.

== Legality ==
It is legal to perform music in the New York City Subway mezzanines with or without a MUNY affiliation. MUNY members as well as freelance performers are subject to regulations of the New York City Police Department and MTA. Section 1050.6 (c) of the New York City Transit Authority's Rules of Conduct regulates the provision of entertainment on the subway:

The following nontransit uses are permitted by the Authority, provided they do not impede transit activities and they are conducted in accordance with these rules: public speaking; campaigning; leafletting or distribution of written noncommercial materials; activities intended to encourage and facilitate voter registration; artistic performances, including the acceptance of donations; solicitation for religious or political causes; solicitation for charities.

== Notable performers ==
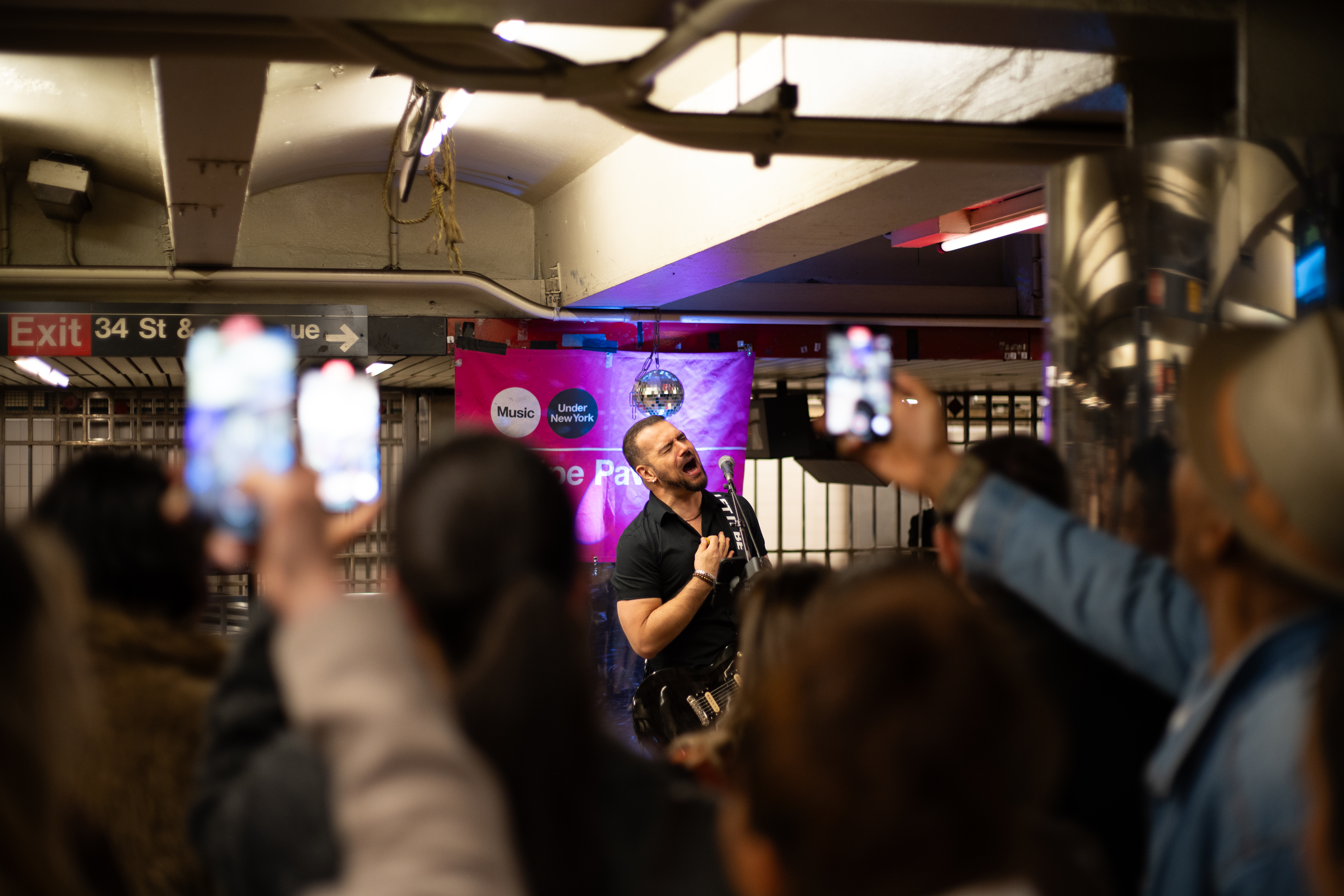
Felipe Pavani performs at 34th Street–Herald Square station in 2025

Many of the musicians who perform in the subway under MUNY hold successful careers above ground as well. Saxophonist Zane Massey was involved early on in arranging big band performances with the organization in the 1980s and 1990s. A number of MUNY performers have gone on to perform at prestigious venues such as Carnegie Hall and Lincoln Center. These artists include Natalia Paruz (whose playing is also on many movie soundtracks, and is known as the "Saw Lady"' for playing the musical saw), VongKu Pak (Korean drum), The Big Apple Boys (a cappella choir), James Graseck (violin), Hypnotic Brass Band, and Natalie Gelman (singer-songwriter). Possibly the best-known of them is Alice Tan Ridley, a gospel singer who was featured on season 5 of America's Got Talent. Similarly, singer Mike Yung has amassed millions of viral Youtube views and has also gone far in America's Got Talent. The current MUNY lineup has artists such as the Ebony Hillbillies, SisterMonk, Didjworks, Manze Dayila, Renaissance Street Singers, Heth and Jed, Kesha, Yaz Band and the Ukuladies. Floyd Lee (1933–2020) was a founding member of MUNY and later a judge on their board. A full list of performers and locations can be found on the MUNY website.

A 2012 YouTube series known as "The Back Of The Busk" featured interviews with a number of MUNY performers, giving an insight into their background and careers.
