= Dunleith, Mississippi =

- Unincorporated community
- Location within Mississippi Location within the United States
- Coordinates: 33°26′09″N 90°49′14″W
- Country: United States
- State: Mississippi
- County: Washington
- Elevation: 112 ft (34 m)
- Time zone: UTC-6 (Central (CST))
  - Summer (DST): UTC-5 (CDT)
- ZIP code: 38756
- Area code: 662
- GNIS feature ID: 669515

Dunleith is an unincorporated community located in Washington County, Mississippi.

Dunleith is approximately 6 miles (9.7 km) east of Leland.

The Dunleith Plantation was located here. In the 1930s, it was considered one of the finest plantations in the Delta. With a tile drainage system, it was valued at over US$1 million.

The Columbus and Greenville Railway runs through the community. The Mount Elm Church is located in Dunleith.

== Notable people ==
- Garland Green, soul singer and pianist.
- Jimmy Reed, blues musician.
- Alfred Holt Stone, planter, writer, politician, and tax commissioner.
