= Leo Welch =

- Also known as: Leo "Bud" Welch
- Born: March 22, 1932; Sabougla, Mississippi, U.S.
- Died: December 19, 2017 (aged 85) Bruce, Mississippi, U.S.
- Genres: Delta blues, gospel blues, country blues
- Occupations: Singer, songwriter, guitarist
- Instrument: Guitar
- Years active: 2014–2017
- Labels: Big Legal Mess; Fat Possum Records; Cleopatra Blues
- Website: leobudwelch.com

Leo "Bud" Welch (March 22, 1932 – December 19, 2017) was an American gospel blues musician and guitarist. He started his music career in 2014, with the release of the album Sabougla Voices by Big Legal Mess Records. His subsequent studio album, I Don't Prefer No Blues, also recorded for Big Legal Mess, was released in 2015.

== Early life ==
Welch was born on March 22, 1932, in the town of Sabougla, Mississippi. He was a lumberjack for 30 years while he learned his musical craft in the Mississippi Delta, where he learned to play various instruments, including the fiddle, harmonica, and guitar.

== Music career ==
His music recording career started in 2014, after he was secretly recorded performing at his manager's birthday party. He released his first album, Sabougla Voices, on the Fat Possum label. The subsequent album, I Don't Prefer No Blues, was released by Big Legal Mess on March 24, 2015.

His 2019 release, The Angels in Heaven Done Signed My Name, was chosen as a 'Favorite Blues Album' by AllMusic.

== Late Blossom Blues ==
The award-winning feature documentary Late Blossom Blues (Ö/US, 2017) by Austrian filmmakers Wolfgang Pfoser-Almer and Stefan Wolner is a portrait of Welch.

== Cameo ==
Welch made a brief appearance in a documentary about Elvis Presley called The King, directed by American filmmaker Eugene Jarecki. He also appeared as himself in the 2015 film "Mississippi Grind."

== Death ==
Welch died at his home in Bruce, Mississippi on December 19, 2017, aged 85.

== Discography ==
- Sabougla Voices (January 6, 2014, Fat Possum / Big Legal Mess)
- I Don't Prefer No Blues (March 24, 2015, Fat Possum / Big Legal Mess)
- Live at The Iridium (March 31, 2017, Cleopatra Blues)
- The Final Session (December 21, 2017, Cleopatra Blues)
- The Angels in Heaven Done Signed My Name (March 8, 2019, Easy Eye Sound)
- Don't Let the Devil Ride (April 12, 2019, Fms Fenn Music)
