= Murphreesboro, Mississippi =

- Ghost town
- Location within the state of Mississippi
- Coordinates: 33°53′58″N 89°58′27″W
- Country: United States
- State: Mississippi
- County: Tallahatchie
- Elevation: 253 ft (77 m)
- Time zone: UTC-6 (Central (CST))
  - Summer (DST): UTC-5 (CDT)
- GNIS feature ID: 708148

Murphreesboro (also New Hope) is a ghost town in Tallahatchie County, Mississippi, United States.

Murphreesboro was located approximately 10 mi (16 km) southeast of Charleston. Ascalmore Creek flowed through the settlement.

Murphreesboro had a post office and a school. In 1900, the population was 56.

Blues guitarist Hayes McMullan was born in Murphreesboro in 1902.
