= Lamar, Mississippi =

- Census-designated place
- Location within Mississippi Location within the United States
- Coordinates: 34°54′44″N 89°18′54″W
- Country: United States
- State: Mississippi
- County: Benton

Area
  - Total: 0.57 sq mi (1.47 km^{2})
  - Land: 0.57 sq mi (1.47 km^{2})
  - Water: 0 sq mi (0.00 km^{2})
- Elevation: 554 ft (169 m)

Population (2020)
  - Total: 39
  - Density: 68.9/sq mi (26.62/km^{2})
- Time zone: UTC-6 (Central (CST))
  - Summer (DST): UTC-5 (CDT)
- ZIP code: 38683
- Area code: 662
- GNIS feature ID: 2812712

Lamar is a census-designated place (CDP) and unincorporated community in Benton County, Mississippi, United States. It is located along Mississippi Highway 7 in western Benton County. Lamar has a post office with the ZIP code 38642. The nearly abandoned Mississippi Central Railroad runs through Lamar, and is only used rarely for freight trafficking.

Per the 2020 Census, the population was 39.

== History ==
Lamar was named in honor of Lucius Quintus Cincinnatus Lamar, author of the Mississippi Ordinance of Secession, Confederate diplomat and U.S. senator. Lamar was originally located in Marshall County, but after Benton County was created from Marshall County and Tippah County, the town was moved two miles east to be closer to the railroad. Lamar was formerly home to a school. A post office first began operation under the name Lamar in 1837.

== Demographics ==
Historical population
Census	Pop.	Note	%±
2020	39		—
U.S. Decennial Census; 2020

Lamar was first listed as a census designated place in the 2020 U.S. census.

=== 2020 census ===
Lamar CDP, Mississippi – Racial and ethnic composition Note: the US Census treats Hispanic/Latino as an ethnic category. This table excludes Latinos from the racial categories and assigns them to a separate category. Hispanics/Latinos may be of any race.
Race / Ethnicity (NH = Non-Hispanic)	Pop 2020	% 2020
White alone (NH)	35	89.74%
Black or African American alone (NH)	1	2.56%
Native American or Alaska Native alone (NH)	0	0.00%
Asian alone (NH)	0	0.00%
Native Hawaiian or Pacific Islander alone (NH)	0	0.00%
Other race alone (NH)	1	2.56%
Mixed race or Multiracial (NH)	0	0.00%
Hispanic or Latino (any race)	2	5.13%
Total	39	100.00%

== Notable person ==
- Floyd Lee, blues musician
