= Charlie Allen (trumpeter) =

American jazz trumpeter (1908–1972)

- Born: September 25, 1908; Jackson, Mississippi, U.S.
- Died: November 19, 1972 (aged 64); Calumet Heights, Chicago, Illinois, U.S.
- Genres: Jazz
- Instruments: Trumpet

Charlie J. Allen (September 25, 1908 – November 19, 1972) was an American jazz trumpeter.

== Early life ==
Born in Jackson, Mississippi, Allen grew up in Chicago and began playing music after graduating from high school in 1925.

== Career ==
Allen was a member of the bands of Hugh Swift (1925), Dave Peyton (1927), Doc Cook (1927), Clifford King (1928), and Johnny Long. Allen worked with Earl Hines from 1931 to 1934, then did a short stint in Duke Ellington's orchestra in 1935, though he never recorded any solos with Ellington. He played with Fletcher Butler in 1936 and then returned to play with Hines again in 1937.

Allen played in various groups in Chicago in the 1940s and 1950s. Later in his life he became a music educator, worked in the Chicago Musicians' Union, and designed custom trumpet mouthpieces (used by Cat Anderson, among others).
