= Sabougla, Mississippi =

- Unincorporated community
- Location within Mississippi Location within the United States
- Coordinates: 33°46′33″N 89°27′51″W
- Country: United States
- State: Mississippi
- County: Calhoun
- Elevation: 331 ft (101 m)
- Time zone: UTC-6 (Central (CST))
  - Summer (DST): UTC-5 (CDT)
- Area code: 662
- GNIS feature ID: 676987

Sabougla is an unincorporated community in Calhoun County, Mississippi, United States.

== History ==
The community takes its name from Sabougla Creek, which flows near the site. A post office called Sabougla was in operation from 1873 until 1920.

== Notable person ==
Leo Welch, a gospel blues musician and guitarist, was born at Sabouga in 1932.
