= Lamont Dozier =

American singer-songwriter (1941–2022)

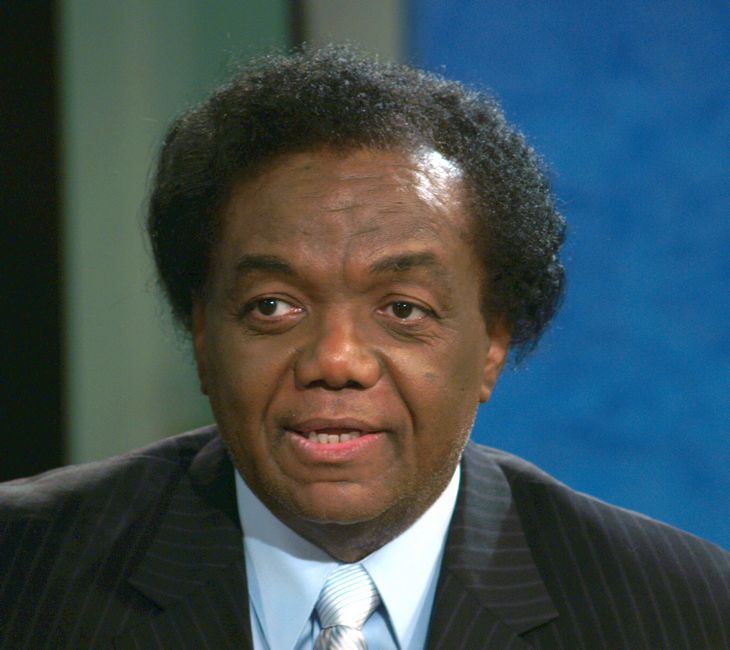
- Dozier in 2009

Background information
- Also known as: Herbert Lamont Dozier
- Born: Lamont Herbert Dozier; June 16, 1941; Detroit, Michigan, U.S.
- Died: August 8, 2022 (aged 81) near Scottsdale, Arizona, U.S.
- Genres: R&B, soul, funk
- Occupations: Singer; songwriter; producer; arranger
- Instrument: Vocals
- Years active: 1962–2022
- Labels: Motown, Invictus/Hot Wax, Warner Bros., ABC Records
- Spouses: Ann Brown (divorced) Daphne Dumas (div. 1969) Barbara Ullman (m. 1980; died 2021)
- Children: 6

Lamont Herbert Dozier (/ləˈmɒnt ˈdoʊʒər/; June 16, 1941 – August 8, 2022) was an American singer, songwriter, and record producer from Detroit. He co-wrote and produced 14 Billboard #1 hits in the US and 4 #4 in the UK.

== Biography ==
=== Early years and career as songwriter and record producer ===
Born in Detroit in 1941, Dozier was best known as a member of Holland–Dozier–Holland, the songwriting and production team responsible for much of the Motown sound and for numerous hit records by artists such as Martha and the Vandellas, the Supremes, the Four Tops, and the Isley Brothers. Along with Brian Holland, Dozier served as the team's musical arranger and producer, while Eddie Holland concentrated mainly on lyrics and vocal production. Along with the Holland Brothers, Dozier followed his work for Motown Records as founder and owner of Invictus Records and Hot Wax Records, producing top-charting hits for acts such as Freda Payne, Honey Cone, Chairmen of the Board, and 100 Proof Aged in Soul.

Dozier recorded a few unsuccessful records for various Detroit labels before the trio started working together as a songwriting and production team for Motown in 1962. They first made their mark the following year with Martha and the Vandellas' early hits, including "Come and Get These Memories" (no. 6 R&B), "Heat Wave" (no. 1 R&B, no. 4 Pop), and "Quicksand" (no. 8 Pop).

In 1964, "Where Did Our Love Go" became the first of 10 no. 1 Pop hits which the trio would write and produce for the Supremes over the next three years or so. After Holland–Dozier–Holland left Motown in 1968 to form the Invictus and Hot Wax labels, Dozier began recording as an artist on these ones. The most successful song was "Why Can't We Be Lovers" (no. 9 in the Billboard R&B charts). Dozier departed from the trio in 1973, and was succeeded by new arranger-producer Harold Beatty.

=== Career as a recording and performing artist ===
Dozier went on to record a number of albums as a performing artist in his own right, also writing much of the material. The 1973 LP Out Here On My Own (by Probe Records) featured the single "Fish Ain't Bitin'" (no. 4 R&B, no. 26 Pop). The 1977 album Peddlin' Music on the Side (for Warner Bros. Records) contained "Going Back to My Roots", which was later recorded by Odyssey.

He had his biggest hit in 1974 with "Trying to Hold on to My Woman" (through ABC Records), which reached no. 15 on the Pop chart and no. 4 on the R&B charts. For the second season of the TV sitcom That's My Mama (ABC, 1975), Dozier wrote and sang the theme song, replacing the first season's instrumental only theme music. In 1981, he scored a beach music hit with "Cool Me Out" and also in that year released the single "Shout About It" from his Lamont LP. This track had considerable airplay on UK soul radio stations as well as being promoted by UK DJ Robbie Vincent in the early 1980s to a British audience.

=== Career as a composer ===
Dozier had another no. 1 hit as a songwriter in the 1980s, joining with Phil Collins to write the song "Two Hearts" for the movie soundtrack of the 1988 film Buster. "Two Hearts" received a Golden Globe Award for Best Original Song, tying with "Let the River Run" from Working Girl by Carly Simon; an Academy Award nomination for Best Original Song; and a Grammy Award for Best Song Written Specifically for a Motion Picture or Television. Collins and Dozier also co-wrote "Loco in Acapulco" for the Four Tops, which is also featured on the Buster soundtrack.

Earlier in 1984 in Essex, England-born singer Alison Moyet scored a U.S. top-40 hit with the Dozier-penned "Invisible". Three years later, Dozier co-wrote "Infidelity" and "Suffer" with Simply Red frontman Mick Hucknall for the 1987 British pop/soul band's second album, Men and Women. In 1989, they teamed again to write "You've Got It" and "Turn It Up" for Simply Red's following LP, A New Flame.

Also in 1987, Dozier composed alone a song for the soundtrack of another film, "Without You", which was recorded as a duet by the R&B singers Peabo Bryson and Regina Belle, for the love theme of the comedy film Leonard Part 6, released the same year. The song was released as a single the next year and entered the U.S. and U.K. music charts, peaked at no. 8 on the Adult Contemporary Tracks, no. 14 on the R&B chart, no. 85 on the UK Singles, and no. 89 on the Billboard Hot 100 (1987–88).

"Without You" was also included in the Peabo Bryson album Positive, released in 1988, and also received two adaptations: the first into Portuguese and the second into Spanish, in 1989 and 1990 respectively. Both adaptations received the title "Amor Dividido" and the Portuguese version was recorded by the Brazilian singer Rosanah Fienngo (also known mononymously as "Rosana"), while the Spanish one was recorded as a duet by Fienngo with Mexican singer Emmanuel.

Dozier is one of the many writers of Motown: The Musical, in 2013.

=== Personal life and death ===
Dozier was married three times and had six children. His first marriage, to Elizabeth Ann Brown, and his second, to Daphne Dumas, both ended in divorce. His third marriage, to Barbara Ullman, lasted from 1980 until her death in 2021; they had three children. Dozier died at his home near Scottsdale, Arizona, on August 8, 2022, at the age of 81.

== Awards and honors ==
Dozier and the Holland brothers were inducted into the Rock and Roll Hall of Fame in 1990.

In 2009, he worked on the music for the musical stage version of the 1996 movie The First Wives Club. He also taught credit courses on popular music as an Artist-in-Residence Professor on the faculty at the University of Southern California "Thornton School of Music" in 2008.

== Discography ==
=== Albums ===
Year	Album	Chart positions		Label
Year	Album	US Pop	US R&B	Label
1973	Out Here on My Own	136	11	ABC
1974	Black Bach	186	27	ABC
1974	Love and Beauty	—	—	Invictus
1976	Right There	—	59	Warner Bros.
1977	Peddlin' Music on the Side	—	59	Warner Bros.
1979	Bittersweet	—	—	Warner Bros.
1981	Working on You	—	—	Columbia
1981	Lamont	—	—	M&M
1983	Bigger Than Life	—	—	Demon Records
1991	Inside Seduction	—	28	Atlantic
2004	Reflections of Lamont Dozier	—	74	Jam Right/Zebra
2018	Reimagination	—	—	V2 Benelux (H'Art)
"—" denotes releases that did not chart.

=== Singles ===
As a member of the Romeos

- "Gone, Gone, Get Away" (1957); Fox 749
- "Moments to Remember You By" (1957); Fox 846

As a member of the Voice Masters:

- "Hope and Pray" (1959); Anna 101
- "Needed" (1959); Anna 102
- "In Love in Vain" (1960); Frisco 15235

As a member of Ty Hunter and the Voice Masters:

- "Orphan Boy" (1960); Anna 1114
- "Free" (1960); Anna 1123

As La Mont Anthony:

- "Popeye (The Sailor Man)" (1961) withdrawn, and replaced by "Benny the Skinny Man" (same backing track, new vocal); Anna 1125
- "Benny the Skinny Man" (1961); Anna 1125
- "Just to Be Loved" / "I Didn't Know (What a Good Thing I Had)" (1961); Checkmate 1001

As Lamont Dozier and a member of Holland-Dozier (Lamont Dozier and Brian Holland):

Year	Title	Peak chart positions				
Year	Title	US Pop	US R&B	US Dance	CAN	UK
1962	"Dearest One"	―	―	―	―	―
1972	"Why Can't We Be Lovers" (as Holland-Dozier)	57	9	―	90	29
1972	"Don't Leave Me Starvin' for Your Love" (as Holland-Dozier)	52	13	―	―	―
1973	"New Breed Kinda Woman" (as Holland-Dozier)	―	61	―	―	―
1973	"Trying to Hold on to My Woman"	15	4	―	43	―
1973	"Fish Ain't Bitin'"	26	4	―	45	―
1974	"Let Me Start Tonite"	87	4	―	―	―
1974	"All Cried Out"	―	41	―	―	―
1976	"Can't Get Off Until the Feeling Stops"	―	89	―	―	―
1977	"Going Back to My Roots"	―	―	35	―	―
1979	"Boogie Business"	―	―	47	―	―
1981	"Shout About It"	―	61	―	―	―
1991	"Love in the Rain"	―	60	―	―	―
"—" denotes releases that did not chart or were not released in that territory.

=== As composer ===
- 1984: "Invisible" – Alison Moyet
- 1987: "Without You" – Peabo Bryson and Regina Belle
- 1988: "Hold On to Love" – Jon Anderson
- 1989: "Two Hearts" – Phil Collins
- 1989: 'You've Got It' - Simply Red
- 1989: "Amor Dividido (Without You)" (Portuguese) – Rosana
- 1990: "Amor Dividido (Without You)" (Spanish) – Rosana and Emmanuel
- 1990: "Anything Is Possible" – Debbie Gibson
- 2004: "Spoiled" – Joss Stone
