= Dear Silas =

American singer and rapper (born 1986)

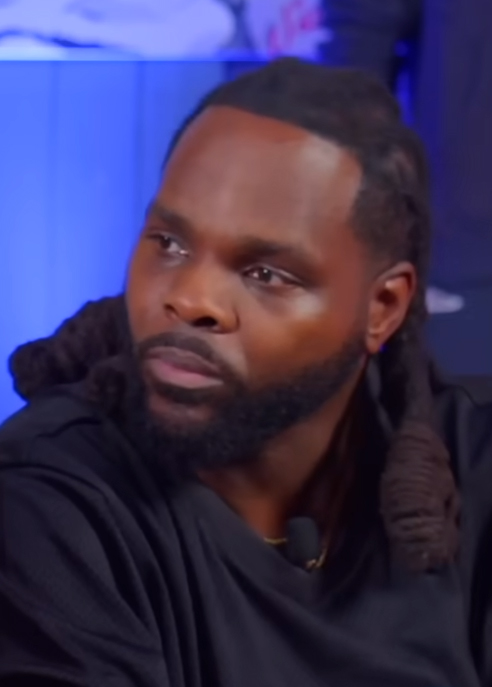
- Silas in 2025

Background information
- Also known as: Trey Parker
- Born: September 9, 1986 (age 40)
- Genres: Rap music; Hip hop music
- Years active: 2014–present
- Labels: RCA Records (former); PREACH Records (former); SND Village
- Website: www.dear-silas.com

Silas Stapleton III (born September 9, 1986), known professionally as Dear Silas, is a singer, rapper, and trumpeter from Jackson, Mississippi.

== Early life and education ==
Raised in a musical family, his father was an alto saxophonist. He began playing the piano at the age of eight and the trumpet at the age of 11. While at Bailey High School he began freestyling, and created his first mixtape.

He attended college at the University of Louisiana in Monroe, studying music performance, but left before he graduated in order to pursue his music career. Music also took precedence over a standup comedy act he had developed.

== Career ==
For a time he stylized his stage name as SilaS, before adopting the name Dear Silas.

The single "Gullah Gullah Island," which came out in February 2016, went viral when former NFL player Chad "Ocho Cinco" Johnson promoted it on his social media. The song imagined an all-black city and celebrated Gullah Geechee culture. It was included on Dear Silas' debut full-length album, The Day I Died, released October 2016.

Dear Silas released his second album, The Last Cherry Blossom, on October 19, 2018. Lucky Town Brewing Company created a tie-in beer for the occasion. The album featured production from Durdy Costello, Flywalker, Swat Team, Professor X, and Hollywood Luck, and appearances by Aha Gazelle, Vitamin Cea, Satchmo Phlanagan, Stephanie Luckett, and Compozitionz.

Also in October 2018, he signed a record deal with RCA Records, which re-released The Last Cherry Blossom on 26 April 2019.

It was while he and his producer/DJ were working at the Genius Bar at an Apple store in Jackson that they conceived the song "Skrr Skrr." When released in December 2018, it became the No. 1 Viral Record on Spotify, where it was streamed over 2.6 million times in its first two weeks. The song also entered the Top 40 on iTunes' Hip-Hop/Rap chart. He came to further notice in 2019 when a fan-made version of the "Dexter meme" clip was released in which the Dexter's Laboratory cartoon character is made to sing "Skrr Skrr" into a girl's ear. In March Vevo presented DSCVR performances of both "Skrr Skrr" and "Under My Feet."

== Discography ==
Studio albums

- The Day I Died (2016)
- The Last Cherry Blossom (2019)
- Plus Ultra (2020)
- It's Giving SELF LOVE! (2022)
- Cadillac Leather in July (2025)
