= Del Rendon =

American singer-songwriter

Del Rendon (1965 – 2005) was an American rock and blues musician from Starkville, Mississippi, United States, whose music career spanned 20 years. He toured throughout the southeastern United States and Nashville, Tennessee. He died on September 4, 2005.

== Bands ==
=== The Downstroke ===
The Downstroke was together for one tape and one CD release.

=== Puerto Rican Rum Drunks ===
Rendon formed the Puerto Rican Rum Drunks in 1996. Chameleon, the band's first release sold over 2,000 copies independently.

== Legacy ==
Rendon is commemorated in the annual Del Rendon Music Festival, also known as DelFest. This is organised by the Del Rendon Foundation, which raises funds for a scholarship in his name at Mississippi State University.

== Discography ==
=== The Downstroke ===
- The Downstroke
- Edna's Cafe

=== Puerto Rican Rum Drunks ===
- Chameleon
- Jelly for the Masses
