= Buster (film) =

1988 film by David Green

- Directed by: David Green
- Written by: Colin Shindler
- Produced by: Norma Heyman
- Starring: Phil Collins; Julie Walters; Larry Lamb; Martin Jarvis; Sheila Hancock; Stephanie Lawrence; Michael Attwell; Ralph Brown; Anthony Quayle
- Cinematography: Tony Imi
- Edited by: Lesley Walker
- Music by: Anne Dudley
- Production companies: The Movie Group; Vestron Pictures
- Distributed by: Vestron Pictures
- Release dates: September 15, 1988 (premiere); September 16, 1988 (London)
- Running time: 102 minutes
- Country: United Kingdom
- Language: English
- Box office: £4.2 million (UK/US)

Buster is a 1988 British romantic crime comedy-drama based on events from the Great Train Robbery of 1963, starring Phil Collins and Julie Walters.

The supporting cast includes Larry Lamb and Sheila Hancock. The soundtrack features two singles from Collins, both of which topped the US Billboard Hot 100 chart.

== Plot ==
Buster Edwards is a petty criminal from Lambeth in 1963 London. His long-suffering wife June thinks of him as a lovable rogue. The film opens with Buster walking along his local high street and breaking into a shop to steal a suit, which he then wears to a funeral. Also attending the funeral is police inspector Mitchell, who happens to be an old school friend of Buster and wants to 'keep in touch'. Buster brings Harry, who has been used on other 'jobs' and has recently served 18 months in prison, to discuss the next 'job' with their ring-leader Bruce Reynolds. Harry wants 'in' and becomes part of the firm who are planning to rob a Royal Mail train allegedly carrying up to £1 million in cash.

After a complex and successful heist, the gang return to their farmhouse hideout to stay out of sight and split the spoils. They find they have stolen over £2.5 million − much more than anticipated. While lying low at the farmhouse, they hear on the radio that the police (led by Mitchell) are searching farmhouses and outhouses within a 30-mile (48 km) radius of the robbery site. The gang become nervous and some members want to immediately return to London for fear of discovery; others think they should keep to the original plan and stay where they are.

The gang decide to return to London, where they meet their 'contact', a solicitor's clerk who, as in the original plan, is to arrange for the farmhouse to be cleared and fully cleaned. The contact states he will bring the plans forward and have the cleaning done over the next two to three days. Bruce, Buster and Harry are not happy with any delay at all because they fear imminent discovery, so they set off back to the farmhouse, to do the job themselves. During the journey, they hear on the radio that the farmhouse hideout has been discovered, so they abandon their plans and return to London, hoping they will have time to escape with their families. Buster returns home and is devastated to find that June has had a miscarriage while he was committing the robbery. She cannot believe it when she learns of his involvement in what has been quickly dubbed "The Great Train Robbery". Politicians, incensed that the gang are being treated as antiheroes by the newspapers, demand that they be punished with extraordinarily long prison sentences, and that no plea bargains ("deals") will be offered to any of the accused.

Most of the gang are slowly rounded up by the police. Several months after the robbery, Buster and June remain in hiding with their young daughter Nicky until they are turned in by a suspicious neighbour. Mitchell and an army of officers arrive too late and discover that they have already fled. Meanwhile, Harry is also arrested by Mitchell, who defies his superiors to offer Harry a deal in return for disclosing Buster and Bruce's whereabouts, but he refuses. Buster flees to Acapulco, where he is met by Bruce and his girlfriend Franny, who are also on the run and living it up in the sun on the proceeds of the crime. June and Nicky arrive later, despite the disapproval of her mother, and although Nicky seems to love her new life in the sun, June is immediately unimpressed and resolves to return to England, despite knowing that if Buster is to return with them he will be imprisoned. Buster remains in Acapulco after June leaves, until realising (while celebrating England's 1966 World Cup triumph), that having money and the sun means nothing if he does not have his family.

He returns to England, in the knowledge he will have to face justice, but in the hope that a deal with Mitchell to reduce his jail sentence will be available. He is quickly arrested and sentenced to 15 years in prison. Skipping forward to a later date after he has been released, Buster is seemingly content and running a flower stall near London's Waterloo Bridge, but he breaks the fourth wall and explains to the audience he still has a "dream", as he and June walk away as the end credits roll.

== Cast ==
- Phil Collins as Buster Edwards
- Julie Walters as June Edwards
- Larry Lamb as Bruce Reynolds
- Stephanie Lawrence as Franny Reynolds
- Ellie Beaven as Nicky Edwards
- Ralph Brown as Ronald Biggs
- Christopher Ellison as George
- Sheila Hancock as Mrs. Rothery
- Martin Jarvis as Inspector Jack Mitchell
- Anthony Quayle as Sir James McDowell
- Michael Attwell as Harry
- Michael Byrne as Poyser
- Clive Wood as Sergeant Chalmers
- Harold Innocent as Justice Parry
- Rupert Vansittart as Fairclough
- John Benfield as Jimmy
- John Barrard as Walter
- Carole Collins as Linda
- Amy Shindler as Susan
- David Shindler as David
- Vincenzo Nicoli as gang member
- Steve McFadden as gang member (uncredited)
- Brian Johnston as radio cricket commentator (uncredited)

== Production ==
Pre-production began in 1987, with Collins first being associated with the project during Genesis' tour for their 13th studio album Invisible Touch (1986).

The robbery scenes where shot at the Great Central Railway Leicestershire with sister Class 40 preserved locomotive D306 (later 40106) made up with fake head code boxes added to resemble the actual locomotive D326.

The real Buster Edwards plays a small cameo during the arrival in Acapulco. He is seen walking out of the airport (62 minutes into the film) with his girlfriend, played by Phil Collins' wife, just before Buster, June, and Nicky also leave.

== Soundtrack ==
The soundtrack includes three songs that were performed by Phil Collins. Two of them were released as singles, namely "A Groovy Kind of Love" and "Two Hearts", which reached No. 1 and No. 6 on the UK Singles Chart, respectively. Both songs were number-one singles in the US.

== Controversy ==
Buster generated controversy on its release because critics argued it made a hero out of Edwards and glamourised a brutal crime. Prince Charles and Princess Diana cancelled their attendance of the film's premiere on 15 September 1988, on the advice of Phil Collins, due to the controversy around it. Collins said he wanted to avoid causing them "embarrassment". One of the film's critics was Conservative MP Ivor Stanbrook, who said the royal couple should not be associated with a film that "commemorates a particularly sordid and vicious crime".

== Release ==
The film opened 16 September 1988, at the Odeon Leicester Square in London and grossed £65,883 in its opening weekend, placing sixth at the UK box office despite playing in just one cinema. After expanding nationwide in its fifth week of release, it reached number one at the UK box office. The film went on to gross £3,939,329 ($7.2 million) in the UK, the highest-grossing independent film of the year; tenth highest-grossing film of the year and the third best British film behind A Fish Called Wanda and The Last Emperor. In the United States and Canada, it grossed $540,000 (£300,000).

== Critical reception ==
Reviews for the film were mixed, with praise for the lead performances but criticism of the film's tone. Radio Times gave the film three stars out of five, stating: "Too squeaky clean to be believable, this is an entertaining but fairy-tale view of law-breaking." Roger Ebert of the Chicago Sun-Times gave it 3 out of 4 and wrote: "Buster is played with surprising effectiveness by rock star Phil Collins, who looks and sounds like a gentler Bob Hoskins." Halliwell's Film Guide described the film as an "uneasy combination of romantic comedy and chase thriller". Leonard Maltin gave the film two-and-a-half stars, writing: "Singer Collins' starring film debut is a diverting (if forgettable) yarn, with Walters a good match as his loving, long-suffering spouse." Maltin also wrote that the film had a "great soundtrack".

== Accolades ==
Award	Category	Nominee(s)	Result	Ref.
Academy Awards	Best Original Song	"Two Hearts"; Music by Lamont Dozier; Lyrics by Phil Collins	Nominated	
Brit Awards	Best Soundtrack/Cast Recording	Buster	Won	
Golden Globe Awards	Best Original Song	"Two Hearts"; Music by Lamont Dozier; Lyrics by Phil Collins	Won (Note: Tied with Carly Simon for "Let the River Run".)	
Grammy Awards	Best Song Written Specifically for a Motion Picture or Television	"Two Hearts" – Phil Collins and Lamont Dozier	Won	
