= Rebecca Boone =

American pioneer

Rebecca Bryan Boone
- Born: Rebecca Ann Bryan; January 9, 1739; Winchester, Colony of Virginia
- Died: March 18, 1813 (aged 74); Charette, Missouri Territory, (present day Marthasville, Missouri)
- Resting place: Frankfort Cemetery, Frankfort, Kentucky
- Spouse: Daniel Boone (m. 1756)
- Children: James Boone; Israel Boone; Susannah Boone Hays; Jemima Boone Callaway; Levina Boone Scholl; Rebecca Boone Goe; Daniel Morgan Boone; Jesse Bryan Boone; William Bryan Boone; Nathan Boone
- Parents: Joseph Bryan, Sr (Note: Rebecca's father is sometimes stated to be Morgan Bryan, which may be because she lived with her Grandmother Martha and Grandfather Morgan Bryan since she had been a young girl.) (father); Hester Bryan (Note: Rebecca Byran's mother has also been identified as Alee (or Aylee or Alice) Linville Byran (Joseph Bryan's second wife).) (mother)

Rebecca Bryan Boone (January 9, 1739 – March 18, 1813) was an American pioneer and the wife of famed frontiersman Daniel Boone. She began her life in the Colony of Virginia (1606–1776), and at the age of ten moved with her grandparents and extended family to the wilderness of the Province of North Carolina (Crown colony (1729–1776), now North Carolina). It was there that she met her future husband, Daniel Boone. Rebecca Boone raised ten of her own children and eight nephews and nieces that she and Daniel had adopted. Since Daniel was away for extended hunting and exploration trips, sometimes for several years at a time, Boone generally raised and protected their eighteen children by herself. Living in the frontier, and needing to be self-reliant, she was a healer, midwife, sharpshooter, gardener, tanner, and weaver. The family was subject to attacks by Native Americans as their land was encroached upon by white settlers and by bands of white men, called highwaymen, who attacked settlers. Several times she and her family left their home for shelter and protection in nearby forts and in one case lived several years in Culpeper County, Colony of Virginia, during the Anglo-Cherokee War.

In 1775, the Boones moved to Kentucky County, Virginia (1776–1780), now the state of Kentucky, where Boone was the first white woman settler. Boone's son James was killed by a group of Cherokee, Delaware, and Shawnee men during the trek through the wilderness. After the family settled at Fort Boone (now Boonesborough), Jemima was captured by Native Americans and was subsequently rescued by Daniel. Daniel was also captured and Boone, believing her husband was dead, returned to North Carolina with her children. Daniel later escaped, returned his family, and later escorted them back to Kentucky County. During the American Revolutionary War (1775–1783), one of Boone's sons was killed and another was wounded at the Battle of Blue Licks (August 19, 1782). Boone moved to numerous locations where she raised her family, ran a tavern kitchen, operated stores, hunted for game, and made and sold maple sugar.

Rebecca has been portrayed as the ideal wife, patient, resourceful, a great beauty, a crack shot with a rifle, moving again and again with Daniel and their family from North Carolina to Virginia, back to North Carolina, to Tennessee, to Kentucky, to Virginia again, and back to Kentucky, then finally to Missouri.

— Robert Morgan, Boone: A Biography

== Early life ==
Rebecca Ann Bryan was born January 9, 1739 in Frederick County, Virginia near Winchester, Colony of Virginia. She was born into the Quaker family of Joseph and Hester Bryan. Hester was Joseph's first wife. The couple had a second daughter, Martha, before Hester died. The young girls were then taken in by their Grandmother Bryan.

In the fall of 1748, Rebecca, Martha, her grandparents Morgan and Martha (Strode) Bryan, and their eight married children and families left Virginia. They traveled along the Great Wagon Road, which at the time was a path of rugged terrain, just wide enough for a horse-drawn cart. It was a long and dangerous trip to the wilderness of the Province of North Carolina, where they settled in the Yadkin River valley in Rowan County, present-day Davie County, North Carolina. They founded the community called Bryan's Settlement. In Augusta County, Virginia, her father, Joseph Bryan, married a second time to Alice "Alee" Linville, with whom he had a large family. Joseph Bryan fathered a total of eleven children.

The Carolina Bryans cleared the land and built cabins and barns for the families. Elk, deer, turkeys, and fish were abundant in the area. Boone gathered berries and nuts and tended the garden. She learned to spin wool, weave, sew, cook, and make candles. She also learned how to dry food for the winter, tan deer hide, ride a horse, and shoot a musket. She received domestic training from her grandmother and learned outdoor skills, like shooting, from the male members of the Bryan family.

Daniel Boone's family, who were Quakers until 1748, migrated from Pennsylvania in 1750 and between the fall of 1751 and spring of 1752, (Note: In March 1748, Squire Boone was expelled from the Quakers when he allowed his son to marry a woman who was not a Quaker. The family first moved to Virginia in 1750, and then to the Providence of North Carolina. There are various years reported as to when the Boones came to the Yadkin River area of Carolina.) they settled along the Yadkin River near the Bryans in Rowan County. (Note: Rowan County was originally a vast territory with wide western boundaries, but its size was reduced to 524 square miles (1,360 km^{2}) after several counties were formed from Rowan County in the 18th and 19th centuries.) There are a couple of stories about Daniel and Rebecca's first meeting. One is that on a night that Rebecca was herding stray cows, Daniel tracked her during a "fire hunt", a Native American night-time method for stalking and shooting deer that became frozen or catatonic by the light. In the story, he followed her to the Bryan homestead. (Note: In 1854, politician and biographer William Henry Bogart said of the fire hunt legend: "Unfortunately, the incident never occurred — nor was it likely to occur. A good hunter, such as Boone, would make no such error. Rebecca, in those days, would have been far more likely to have deemed her lover very absurd, to have thus been deceived, and to have doubted his skill." According to author Eva Thury, Daniel said that he never engaged in fire hunts.) Another is that they first met at a cherry picking. They likely first "took notice of each other" at the wedding of Mary Boone, Daniel's sister, to Rebecca's Uncle William—or the later wedding of Squire Boone, Daniel's relative, to Rebecca's Aunt Rebecca. Rebecca was said to have been a tall, attractive woman with black hair and dark eyes. No contemporary portrait of her exists.

Rebecca and Daniel were engaged for two years, during which Daniel fought in Pennsylvania under General Edward Braddock during the French and Indian War (1754–1763). During that period, gangs of white men called highwaymen "plundered, stole, and killed" people in the Yadkin River area; They often disguised themselves as Native Americans. The French hired Cherokee men to raid settlers in the area.

Joseph Bryan settled in the Providence of North Carolina about 1755, living about four miles from his father, Morgan Bryan. Rebecca and Martha Bryan lived with their grandparents until they were married. (Note: In 1775 and 1776, Joseph and his brothers James, Morgan, and William founded Bryan's Station near Lexington, Kentucky. Bryan's Station was abandoned in 1777 when three other settlements were also abandoned, but the Station was reclaimed two years later. After living again in North Carolina, Bryan settled in Shelby County, Kentucky in 1798 where he had a 14,000-acre plantation at Floyd's Fork.) Martha married Edward (Ned) Boone, Daniel's brother.

== Marriage and children ==
Rebecca Bryan married Daniel Boone on August 14, 1756, becoming Rebecca Bryan Boone. She was 17 years of age. Daniel's father Squire Boone officiated the wedding in what is now Davie County, North Carolina. Initially, they lived in a cabin on Squire Boone's land. Before the birth of her first child, the Boones had moved to a small farm and built a one-story log house on Sugartree Creek near members of the Bryan family, close to current-day Farmington, North Carolina. The log house, built with the assistance of Bryan and Boone family members, was unusual for a home in the wilderness. It had glass windows, a hand-pump well, and a separate summer kitchen.

Boone's life was difficult as a frontierswoman. She raised the children on her own during the falls and winters that Daniel spent hunting and trapping furs and on his extended exploration trips into the wilderness. Pelts that Daniel sold to traders supported the family. Boone grew up learning how to raise, feed, and clothe a family in the wilderness. She was also reputed to be a midwife, healer, leather tanner, sharpshooter, and linen-maker. (Note: She made clothes from deerskins and woven cloth. She weaved fabric from the thread that she had spun and dyed the cloth with plant juices.) During the extended periods that Daniel was away, she protected her family from attacks by highwaymen and Native Americans. An accomplished hunter, she hunted deer and other game and grew produce to feed her family. When they were old enough, the children helped Boone run the farm and perform domestic chores. Boone sold a variety of produce for income. During financially lean years, the Boones made and sold hundreds of pounds of maple sugar. She entertained Native Americans who came to visit her husband. (Note: There is a legend that one Native American chief wanted to buy her because of the cornbread she had served.)

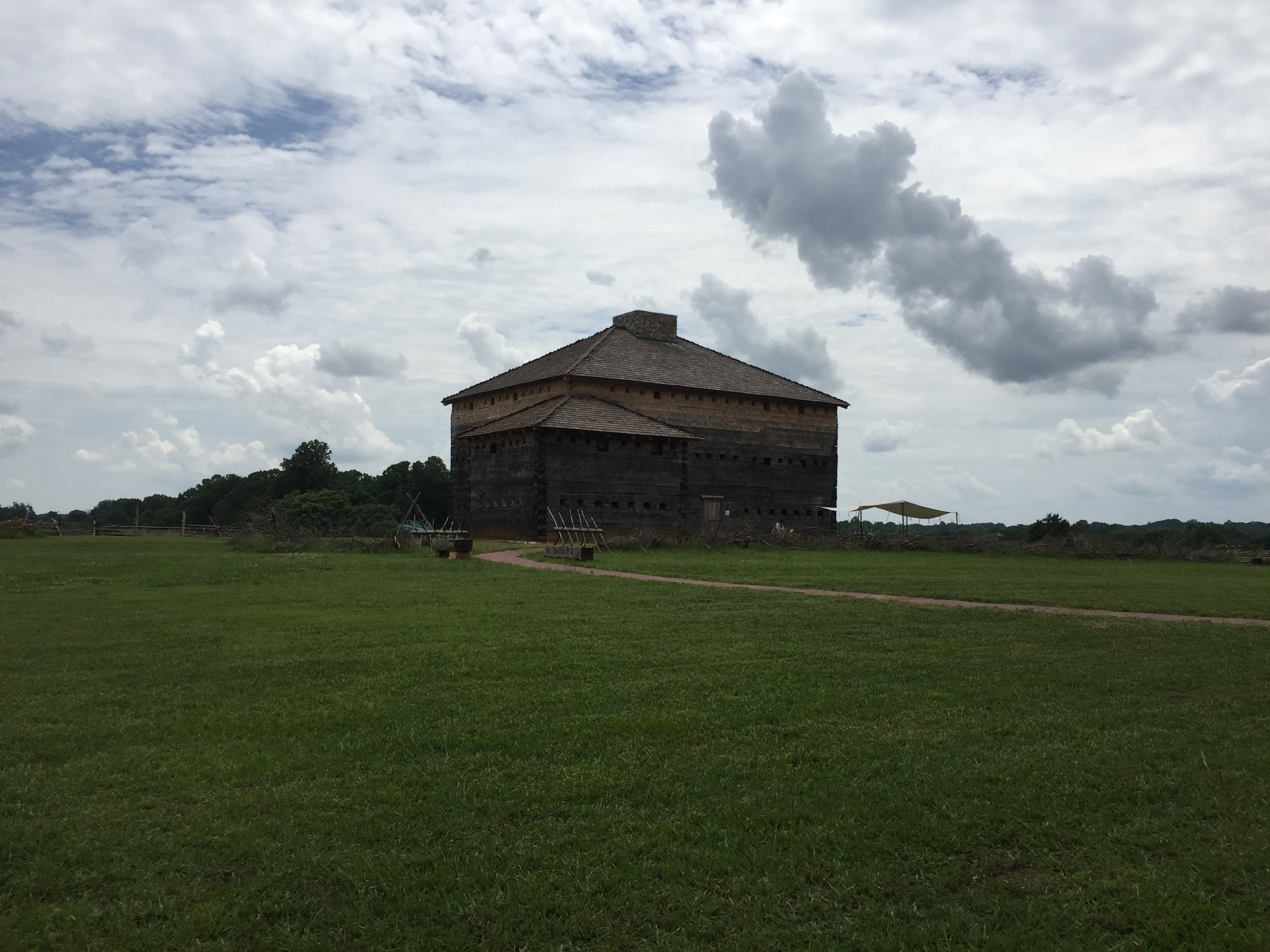
Fort Dobbs was the only fort built in the frontier region of the North Carolina colony. The fort was reconstructed and opened to the public in 2019.

By 1757, forts, like Fort Dobbs in the Yadkin River valley, were built for refuge during attacks by Cherokee people, who until this point had "cordial if wary relations with the whites." Native Americans began attacking after white people settled in their hunting grounds. In 1759, following a raid during the Anglo-Cherokee War, Daniel served with the militia under Major Hugh Waddell and Boone went to Culpeper County, Virginia (Note: Waldrup states that they went to Fairfax, Virginia) with their four children—young James, baby Israel, and nephews Jesse and Jonathan. Their first daughter Susannah was born in November 1760, after which Daniel went on extended winter hunts and fought in the militia. Boone and her husband were separated for nearly two years. (Note: According to family lore, biographer Robert Morgan, and historian Lyman Draper, Boone gave birth in October 1762 to her daughter Jemima, who was conceived during Daniel's absence. Believing that Daniel died during that time, she is said to have had a relationship with his brother Edward "Ned" Boone or a "certain Boone", and her husband accepted the daughter as if she were his. Morgan also states, though, that it is possible that Daniel fathered Jemima. In addition, Ned had married Boone's sister about the time that Jemima was conceived and Morgan finds it unlikely that Ned would have fathered a child with his sister-in-law at that time. Faragher contends that the story, called "Boone's Surprise" is possibly such an interesting legend that there has not been an interest in correcting the story.) The Boones returned to Rowan County in November 1762. (Note: According to Waldrup, while they were away, Native Americans had set fire to their house and it was destroyed. They built a house and settled on a 640-acre tract that Daniel purchased from his father. Daniel and Rebecca purchased the land on Bear Creek from Daniel's parents by October 12, 1759, and sold it on February 21, 1764. Located on both sides of Bear Creek, the land is two miles west of present-day Mocksville, North Carolina.)

There was relative peace in North Carolina for a time after the Cherokee signed a peace treaty in November 1761. After the harvest in 1766, the Boones moved 65 miles (105 km) west to Holman's Ford in Wilkes County. They moved two more times in the next couple of years, living near Beaver Creek and then overlooking the Yadkin River. Their frequent moves were generally because settlers had tapped out the game in the area forests.

=== Children ===
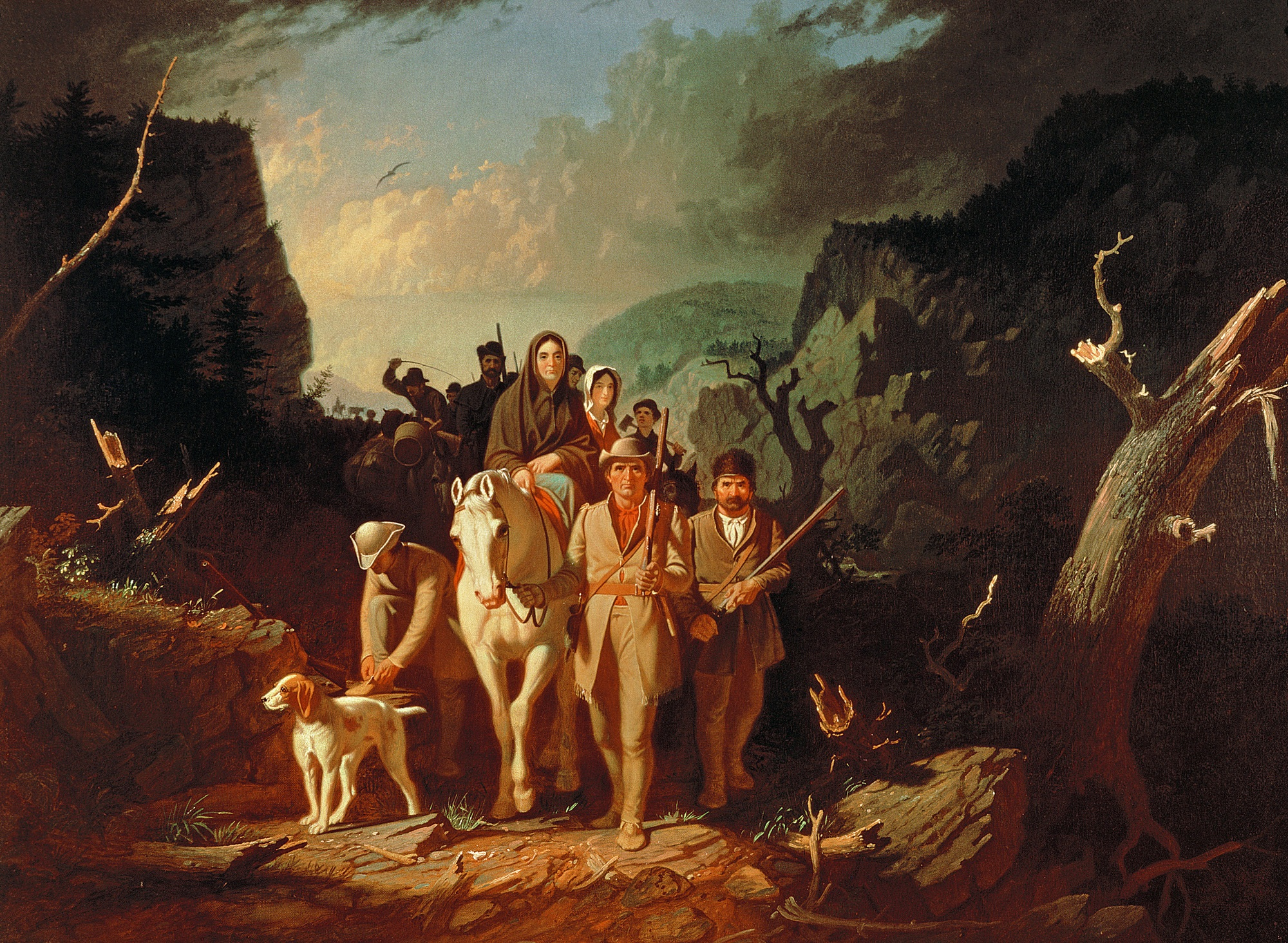
George Caleb Bingham, Daniel Boone escorting settlers through the Cumberland Gap, 1852. Using Biblical and classical imagery to justify and make westward expansion appear heroic, Bingham portrayed Rebecca Boone in the pose of a Madonna, a popular domestic ideal of the time, and she is completed in interpretive ways with a faithful hunting dog and her husband leading a noble charger.

Boone raised eighteen children. Soon after her wedding, Boone took in her husband's two orphaned nephews, Jesse and Jonathan. Her brother-in-law Israel Boone and his wife died of tuberculosis before her wedding; their two daughters also died of the disease soon after their parents. Jesse and Jonathan lived with Boone in North Carolina until the family left for Kentucky in 1773.

Over twenty-five years, Boone delivered six sons and four daughters, most of whom were born in North Carolina and one was born in Boonesborough. Boone's children were:

- James Boone (May 3, 1757 – October 10, 1773) was killed at age 16 by Shawnee in the Clinch Mountains, Virginia
- Israel Boone (January 25, 1759 – August 19, 1782), died during the Revolutionary War at Blue Licks, Kentucky
- Susannah Boone Hays (November 2, 1760 – October 19, 1800, now St. Charles County, Missouri)
- Jemima Boone Callaway (October 4, 1762 – died in Montgomery County, Missouri)
- Lavinia or Levina Boone Scholl (March 23, 1766 – April 6, 1802, Clark County, Kentucky)
- Rebecca Goe (May 26, 1768 – died in Clark County, Kentucky)
- Daniel Morgan Boone (December 23, 1769 – July 13, 1839, Jackson County, Missouri)
- Jesse Bryan Boone (May 23, 1773 – died in St. Louis, Missouri)
- William Bryan Boone (June 25, 1775 – died in infancy 1775)
- Nathan Boone (March 2, 1781 – 1856, Ash Grove, Greene County, Missouri)

Her elder children began having children while she continued to have children. She adopted her widowed brother's six children when she was in her early forties. The children stayed with the Boones until they married.

== Kentucky ==
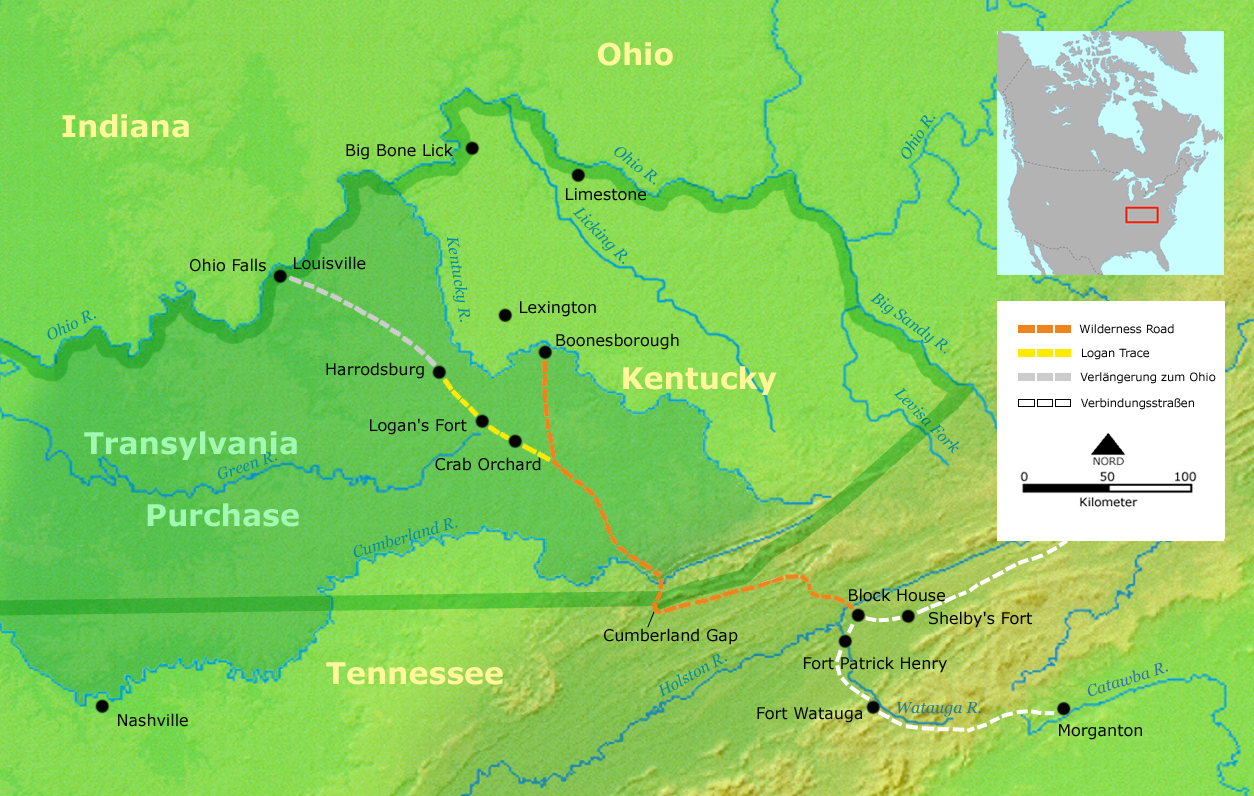
The Boones traveled northwest on the Wilderness Road from what is now North Carolina, through the Cumberland Gap to Fort Boone (now Boonesborough)

Daniel had traveled into what is now the state of Kentucky beginning in 1767 and again in May 1769 with an exploration expedition to build a trail through Cumberland Gap for traders and settlers. In December of that year, he and another man were captured by members of the Shawnee nation and they were warned not to return. During that time, Boone was still in North Carolina, living a difficult frontier life with threats of attacks by Native Americans and long periods when her husband was away. Boone was visited by Moravian missionary George Soelle in 1771. He wrote in his diary that Boone "is by nature a quiet soul, and of few words. She told me of her trouble, and the frequent distress and fear in her heart." Daniel returned to North Carolina in 1771, after spending two years in Kentucky. Boone was intent on leaving North Carolina for several reasons, he owed money to people there, the settlements were becoming crowded, and he sought better hunting grounds.

In 1773, Daniel headed for Kentucky with Boone, their children, and other settlers, a party of about 80 people. According to contemporary Daniel Boone biographer Timothy Flint, during the trek Boone "followed [her husband] from North Carolina into the far wilderness, without a road or even a trace to guide their way—surrounded at every step by wild beasts and savages." The move, though, would encroach on Shawnee and Cherokee land. Daniel had been warned by the Native Americans not to return to what is now Kentucky. The settlers were attacked by a group of Cherokee, Delaware, and Shawnee men in October. Six men, including Boone's son James, were tortured and killed. Boone and other survivors returned to North Carolina, taking up temporary residence along the Clinch River, where settlers established forts for protection. Boone and her children found shelter at Moore's Fort after bands of Shawnee attacked settlers in the area. She helped defend the fort during an attack.

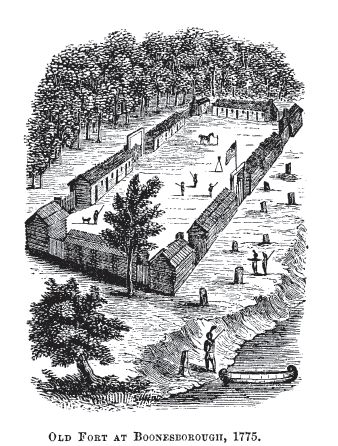
Fort Boone, now Boonesborough, Kentucky

After the Lord Dunmore's War of 1774, Native Americans ceded their land in Kentucky. Daniel was hired to open up a trail, later called the Wilderness Trail, into Kentucky County, Virginia. He began building the trail in early 1775. He worked with other prospective settlers to raise $50,000 (equivalent to $1,418,102 in 2025) to purchase land held by Cherokees in Kentucky, which was then called the Transylvania Colony or Transylvania Purchase. Kentucky was recognized as a county of Virginia. Boone gave birth to her son William in late July 1775, it was a difficult birth and he died soon after. Although Daniel had plans to move to Kentucky, the trip was delayed six weeks until Boone was strong enough for the trip.

Beginning in April 1775, Daniel supervised the construction of Fort Boone that included a block house and cabins, enclosed within a palisade. The Boones' cabin was one of the few that was built outside of the palisade. On September 8, 1775, the Boones settled at Fort Boone. Boone was the first white woman to have settled in Kentucky. Boone, who had brought seeds with her to Kentucky, planted a garden with her daughters.

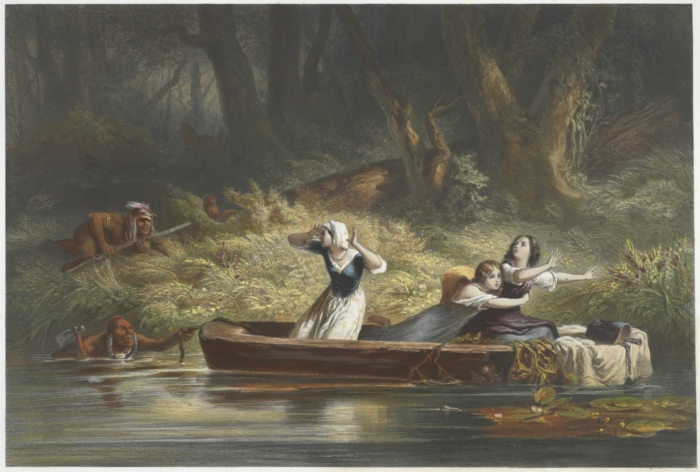
Karl Bodmer, Capture of the Daughters of Daniel Boone and Richard Callaway by the Indians, 1852, Yale University Art Gallery, New Haven, Connecticut

Jemima and two of her friends, Betsey and Frances, daughters of Col. Callaway, were captured by Native Americans on July 5, 1776. Daniel led the rescue effort to get the girls. (Note: Ellet states that they were captured on July 7, 1776.) (Note: James Fenimore Cooper was inspired by the capture and rescue of Jemima Boone to write the historical novel, The Last of the Mohicans.) There were periodic raids by Native Americans at Fort Boone, with 47 people killed by Native Americans between 1775 and 1779. The British had urged local Native Americans to hit certain targets, like Boonesborough and other settlements south of the Ohio River.

Daniel was captured by Shawnee Chief Blackfish in February 1778 and was held captive through June. After three months, Boone assumed her husband had died. She and her children returned to North Carolina, (Note: Jemima and her husband Flanders Callaway stayed behind at Fort Boone.) having found Kentucky to be a "dark and bloody ground".

During my captivity with the Indians, my wife, who despaired of ever seeing me again, expecting the Indians had put a period to my life, oppressed with the distress of the country, and bereaved of me, her only happiness, had, before I returned, transported my family and goods, on horses, through the wilderness, amidst a multitude of dangers, to her father's house, in North Carolina.

— Daniel Boone

Daniel escaped his captors around June 1778 (Note: Daniel Boone was also said to have escaped in 1780.) and traveled to North Carolina to reconnect with his family. He arrived on November 7, 1778, and pressed Boone to return with him to Kentucky. Daniel said of the time, "The history of my going home, and returning with my family, forms a series of difficulties, an account of which would swell a volume." Boone's husband spent the next several seasons recruiting other families to move with them. In the summer of 1779, Daniel led Boone and their children back to Kentucky. Traveling with them were members of the Boone and Bryan families and others, including the family of Abraham Lincoln (the president's grandfather).

In December 1779, Daniel founded Boone Station on the opposite shore of the Kentucky River on Boone's Creek (near what is now Athens, Kentucky) with 15 to 20 families, including extended family members. Daughters Susannah and Jemima were established with their own families at Boone's Station. Boone later lived with her family in a double cabin on Marble Creek. She had five children at home—Israel, Levina, Rebecca, Daniel Morgan, and Jesse Bryan. Their last child, Nathan, was born in March 1781. Boone welcomed six children of her widowed uncle James Bryan. In the early 1780s, Susannah's family of four or five moved in with the Boones.

== Late Revolutionary War ==
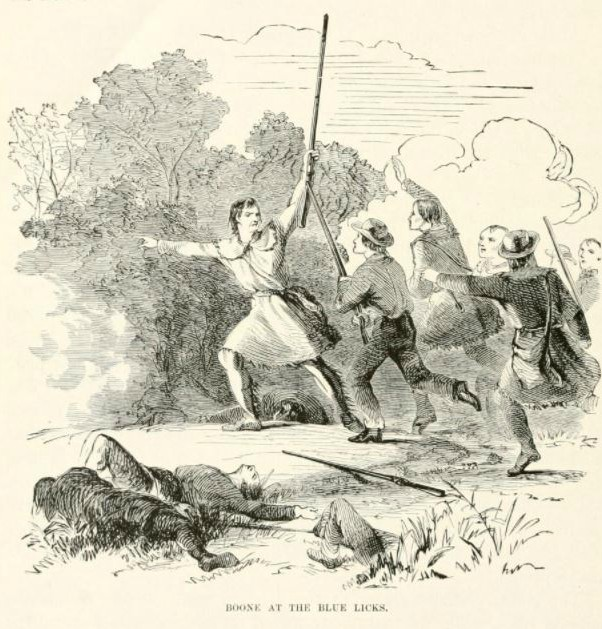
Francis S. Drake, Daniel Boone at Battle of Blue Licks, 1919

Daniel, elected to the Virginia General Assembly, takes his seat in April 1781. He was captured by British troops in June, but was soon released. Boone's husband, serving as lieutenant colonel, and two of her sons fought together at the Battle of Blue Licks (August 19, 1782) of the Revolutionary War. One son, Israel, died and another son was wounded. (Note: Israel is also said to have died during an attack by the Shawnee. The Shawnee were among the Native American tribes that fought in the Battle of Blue Licks.)

She and her family moved in 1783 to Limestone (now Maysville, Kentucky) on the Ohio River. They lived in a cabin built out of an old boat (on what is now Front Street in Maysville, Kentucky). The Boones operated a surveying business, a store, and a tavern. Boone, now 46 years old, ran the tavern kitchen and the general store. At that time, the family owned seven enslaved people.

== Virginia ==
In 1787, Daniel was elected to the legislature as a representative of Bourbon County, and he moved to Richmond, Virginia with Boone and Nathan, leaving the tavern in the hands of their daughter Rebecca and husband Philip Goe.

After Daniel's failed attempts at land speculation and ginseng exports, they moved in 1788 to Charleston (now in West Virginia) in the Kanawha Valley. They settled on the south side of the river almost opposite the mouth of Campbell's Creek in a log house similar to what he had built in Kentucky: two rooms with a "dogtrot" passage between the rooms and a long porch in front. In 1789, Boone and her youngest children moved to Point Pleasant of Virginia (now West Virginia) on the Ohio River. There, they operated a store and Daniel worked as a surveyor and supplied the local militia. Boone moved three more times by 1798, including a move back to Kentucky near some of his children and grandchildren. By 1794, Boone and Daniel lived alone, without any of their children, for the first time in their marriage. Boone accompanied her husband on hunting trips, living in hunting camps, when his rheumetism made it difficult for him to aim and shoot his firearm.

== Missouri ==
In 1799, Boone and her husband moved with extended family members to the Spanish Territory of Alta Luisiana (Upper Louisiana, now Missouri) in the Femme Osage valley. Daniel was appointed Syndic, district magistrate by the Spanish government. In 1803, Boone and her husband went to live with their son Nathan. Daughters Susannah, Levina, and Rebecca died between 1800 and 1805. Levina's husband moved from Kentucky to Missouri with their eight children. Rebecca's husband also died, leaving her children orphaned. Son David Morgan Boone traveled to Kentucky and brought five of her seven children to also be with the Boones in Missouri. Boone and her husband hunted and made maple sugar. During the War of 1812, Missouri settlers were attacked by Native Americans, urged on by the British. Boone and her husband sought shelter in nearby forts on several occasions.

== Death ==
Rebecca Bryan Boone died on March 18, 1813, at her daughter Jemima Boone Callaway's home near the village of Charette (near present-day Marthasville, Missouri). She was buried at the Old Bryan Farm Cemetery (also called the Bryan-Boone family cemetery), overlooking the Missouri River, in the Marthasville area. Daniel died in 1820.

She and her husband's remains were disinterred and buried again in Frankfort Cemetery in Frankfort, Kentucky in September 1845.

== Honors and legacy ==
In 1860, a monument was built by John Haley and was placed over her and her husband's graves in Frankfort. In 1862, four marble panels, which depicted scenes from Daniel and Boone's lives, were added to the monument.

The World War II Liberty ship SS Rebecca Boone was named in her honor. It was launched in Houston, Texas on December 21, 1943.

According to Annette Kolodny and Eva Thury, many of Daniel Boone's biographers devalued the role that Boone played in raising and protecting her children in the wilderness. For instance, she says that Timothy Flint writes that "an exemplary Rebecca Boone appeared all too infrequently and all too indistinctly to stand proof against the many and changing stereotypes in which others, in the future, would cast her. And by portraying her first and most dramatically as reflected in the flickering and distorting torchlight of her husband's predominating myth, Flint effectively annihilated any possibility that she might achieve mythic status on her own." Thury compares her to Greek mythical figures Penelope, Hecuba, Deianira, and others for her ability to overcome significant challenges, her strength of character, and her ability to survive during extended, lonely absences of her husband. Author Etta DeGering compares her to the Biblical figure, Ruth, for following where her husband leads, fitting the historical view of women as compliant.

Author Mark Gerzon said of Boone, "Nearly as tall as her husband, Rebecca Bryan Boone was a remarkable woman. Single-handedly, and often under harsh frontier conditions, she cared and provided for their children while Daniel was gone for months on various expeditions. When Daniel was kidnapped by the Shawnee, she moved her children hundreds of miles on horseback through hostile Indian territory. When her aging husband was racked by rheumatism, she went hunting and brought back enough game to feed them all. Yet she is depicted in the popular nineteenth-century biographies of the legendary 'Col. Daniel Boone' as merely an 'amiable Spouse' without any personality of her own."

Samuel A. Drake said of her, "For more than half a century, throughout all the extraordinary vicissitudes of her husband's career, [Rebecca Bryan Boone] had been the faithful and heroic wife and mother."

== Popular culture ==
External images
- N. C. Wyeth, Dan'l Boone-The Home Seeker-Cumberland Valley, ca. 1937, Brandywine Museum of Art
- Robert Eberhardt Von Der Launitz, Rebecca Boone Milking, Daniel Boone Monument, Frankfort Cemetery, Kentucky

- N. C. Wyeth made a painting of Daniel Boone and his wife crossing the Cumberland Gap entitled Dan'l Boone-The Home Seeker-Cumberland Valley. They were among the first pioneers who traveled on the trail that Daniel recently completed, now known as the Wilderness Road. Boone, wrapped up in a blue cloak that is often used in depictions of Mary, mother of Jesus, holds a swaddled baby while she rides a horse. Her presence, like that of Mary and Jesus in Flight into Egypt, represents the many women who left their homes for the dangers of the frontier. During the Boone family's trek in 1773, Boone had recently given birth to her son Jesse, but the family had to turn back due to the danger. In 1775, she had given birth to William, who died shortly after his birth.
- George Caleb Bingham painted the image of Daniel Boone escorting settlers through the Cumberland Gap, 1852. In that painting, Daniel Boone leads Boone's horse during the trek through the Cumberland Gap. David M. Lubin says of her depiction, "Rebecca Bryan Boone, the pioneer's wife, garbed in a robelike shawl and riding sidesaddle, looks as though she were Mary in a traditional Flight into Egypt. One hand rests upon her lap while the other holds the reins passively, relinquishing control of the horse to her husband. But this hardly makes Rebecca a figure of powerlessness. Her head higher than anyone else's, she is depicted as a heavenly mother but also as a strong physical presence. With dour expression, straight-ahead gaze, and steadiness upon her mount, she is the essential pioneer woman, rugged, unafraid, a key player in the shaping of her own destiny and that of her small migrant community."
- Robert Eberhardt Von Der Launitz made the bas relief of Rebecca Boone Milking that is affixed on the Daniel Boone Monument at her and her husband's grave site in Kentucky.
- Traces by Patricia Hudson is historic fiction which tells the Boone family story through the eyes of Rebecca, and the two eldest daughters, Jemima and Rebecca. The novel was published in 2022 by the University of Kentucky Press.

== See also ==
- Katharine Steel, who raised and protected her children in the wilderness of Colonial North Carolina

== Sources ==
- Brown, Meredith Mason (2009). Frontiersman. Louisiana State University Press. ISBN 978-0-8071-3356-9.
- Ellet, Elizabeth Fries (1852). "Rebecca Boone". Pioneer Women of the West. New York: Charles Scribner.
- Faragher, John Mack (1993). Daniel Boone: The Life and Legend of an American Pioneer. Macmillan. ISBN 978-0-8050-3007-5.
- Kleber, John E., ed. (1992). "Boone, Rebecca (Bryan)". The Kentucky encyclopedia. Lexington, Kentucky: University Press of Kentucky. ISBN 978-0-8131-1772-0.
- Kolodny, Annette (1984). The land before her : fantasy and experience of the American frontiers, 1630-1860. Chapel Hill; London : The University of North Carolina Press. ISBN 978-0-8078-1571-7.
- Lofaro, Michael (2010). Daniel Boone: An American Life. University Press of Kentucky. ISBN 978-0-8131-2886-3.
- Morgan, Robert (2007). Boone: A Biography. Chapel Hill, North Carolina: Algonquin Books of Chapel Hill. ISBN 978-1-56512-455-4.
- Thury, Eva M. (2016). Introduction to mythology : contemporary approaches to classical and world myths. New York; Oxford : Oxford University Press. ISBN 978-0-19-026298-3.
- Waldrup, Carole Chandler (2004). "Rebecca Bryan Boone". More Colonial women : 25 pioneers of early America. Jefferson, N.C. : McFarland & Co. ISBN 978-0-7864-1839-8.
