= Squire Boone Sr. =

English Quaker settler in America, father of Daniel Boone (1696–1765)

- Born: November 25, 1696; Bradninch, Devonshire, England
- Died: January 2, 1765 (aged 68); Salisbury, North Carolina, United States of America
- Occupations: Weaver, blacksmith, gunsmith, farmer, justice of the peace
- Known for: being the father of Daniel Boone and Squire Boone
- Spouse: Sarah Morgan (m. 1720)
- Children: 12 including Daniel Boone, Squire Boone and Hannah Boone Pennington
- Parents: George Boone III (father); Mary Maugridge (mother)
- Relatives: Jemima Boone (granddaughter); Daniel Morgan Boone (grandson); Nathan Boone (grandson); Levi Day Boone (grand nephew); Alphonso Boone (great-grandson)

Squire Boone Sr. (November 25, 1696 – January 2, 1765) was an English-American Quaker, weaver, blacksmith, gunsmith, farmer, justice of the peace, and the father of Squire Boone Jr. and Daniel Boone.

== Biography ==
Squire Boone Sr. was born in 1696 in Bradninch, England to George Boone III (1666–1744) and Mary Maugridge (1669–1740). Squire, along with his parents and nine siblings, immigrated to America in 1712 and lived in the Province of Pennsylvania. In America, he worked as a weaver, blacksmith, gunsmith and farmer from 1720 to 1750. On September 23, 1720, he married Sarah Morgan (1700–1777) and had 12 children with her between 1724 and 1746. Including Daniel Boone in 1734 and Squire Boone Jr. in 1744, on May 1, 1750, he moved to North Carolina and in June 1753, he became the justice of peace for Rowan County, North Carolina. In 1764, he moved to Salisbury and lived there until his death on January 2, 1765.
