= Karl Ferdinand Wimar =

German-American painter (1828–1862)

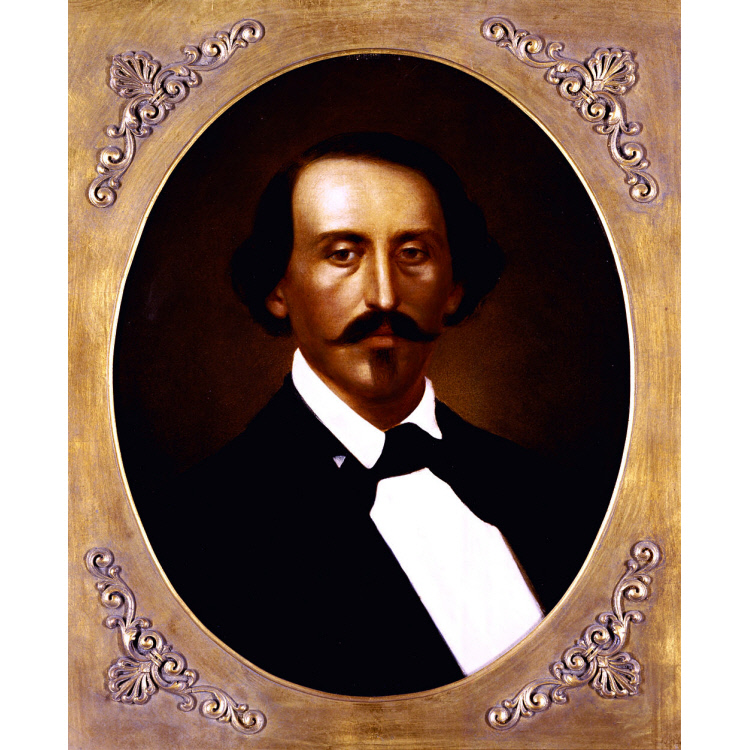
- Self portrait
- Born: 20 February 1828; Siegburg, Germany
- Died: 28 November 1862 (aged 34); St. Louis, Missouri, U.S.
- Known for: Painting

Karl Ferdinand Wimar (also known as Charles Wimar and Carl Wimar; 20 February 1828 – 28 November 1862) was a German-American painter who concentrated on Native Americans in the West and the great herds of buffalo.

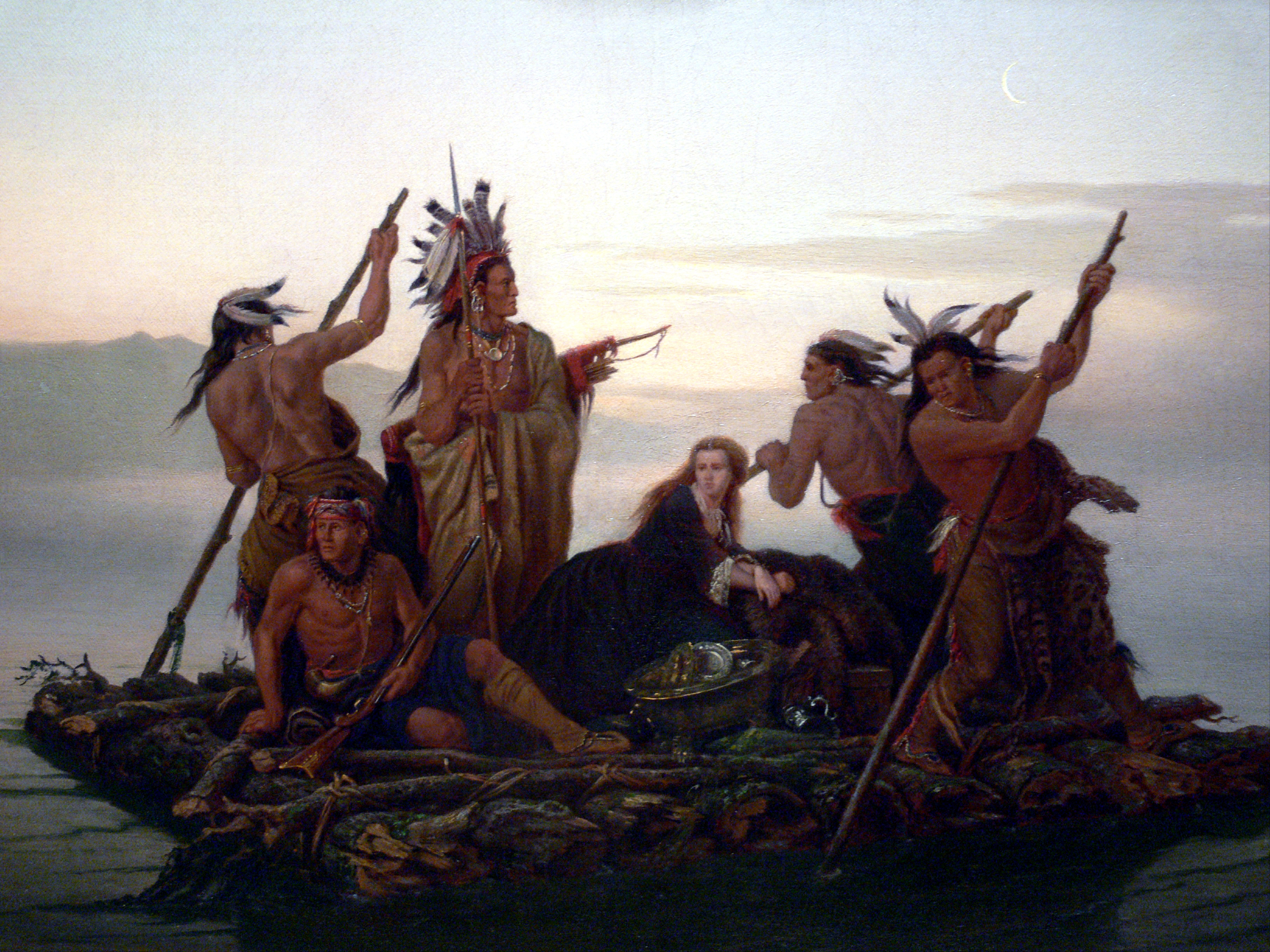
Abduction of Boone's Daughter, 1855–56, detail, Amon Carter Museum of American Art

He is known for an early painting of a colonial incident: his The Abduction of Boone's Daughter by the Indians (1855–56), a depiction of the 1776 capture near Boonesborough, Kentucky of Jemima Boone and two other girls by a Cherokee-Shawnee raiding party.

== Early life and education ==
Born in Siegburg, Wimar immigrated to the United States at the age of 15 with his family. They settled in St. Louis.

In 1846, he began studying painting with Leon Pomarede. Together they traveled up the Mississippi River. In 1852, he went to the Düsseldorf Academy to study with Emanuel Leutze. He is associated with the Düsseldorf school of painting.

== Career ==
Wimar returned to St. Louis in 1856. About this time, he painted a notable incident from the colonial era, The Abduction of Boone's Daughter by the Indians (1855–1856). It was one of his first works to achieve notice in the United States. A recent exhibit at the Amon Carter Museum described the painting as showing five Indians and Jemima in a canoe, each wondering when rescuers would come for her.

Wimar primarily painted the themes of Indian life on the Great Plains, showing the Native American hunts of buffalo and other activities related to their nomadic lives. He also painted scenes of the emigrant wagon trains that carried pioneer settlers across the western expanses.

He made two long trips in 1858 and 1859 up the Missouri River, and was inspired by his experiences and observations of Native American life. He also traveled up the Mississippi.

Among Wimar's best-known works are murals painted in 1861 in the Rotunda of the St. Louis Court House. The building is now part of the Gateway Arch National Park.

== Works ==
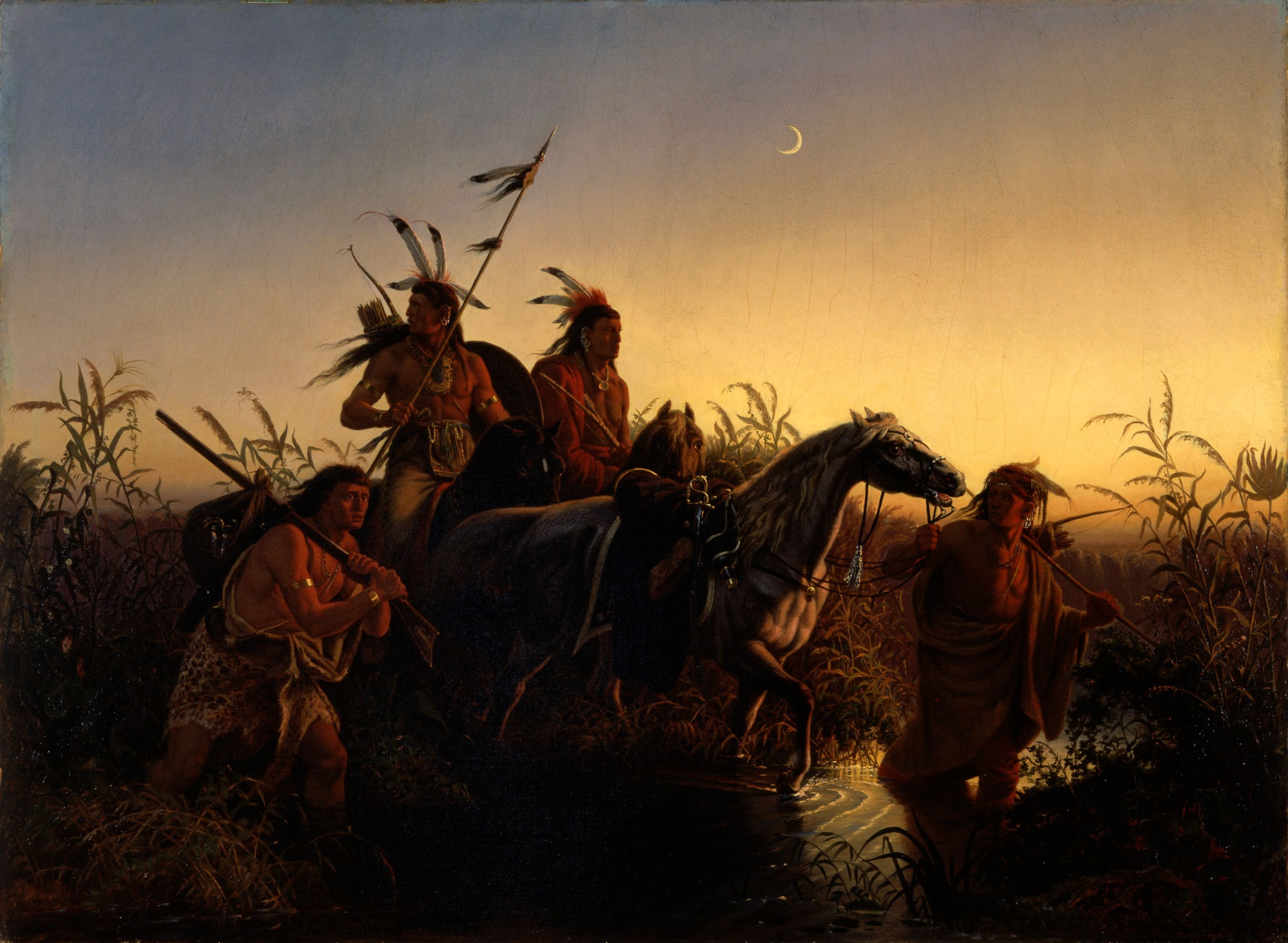
The Captive Charger, Charles Ferdinand Wimar, 1854

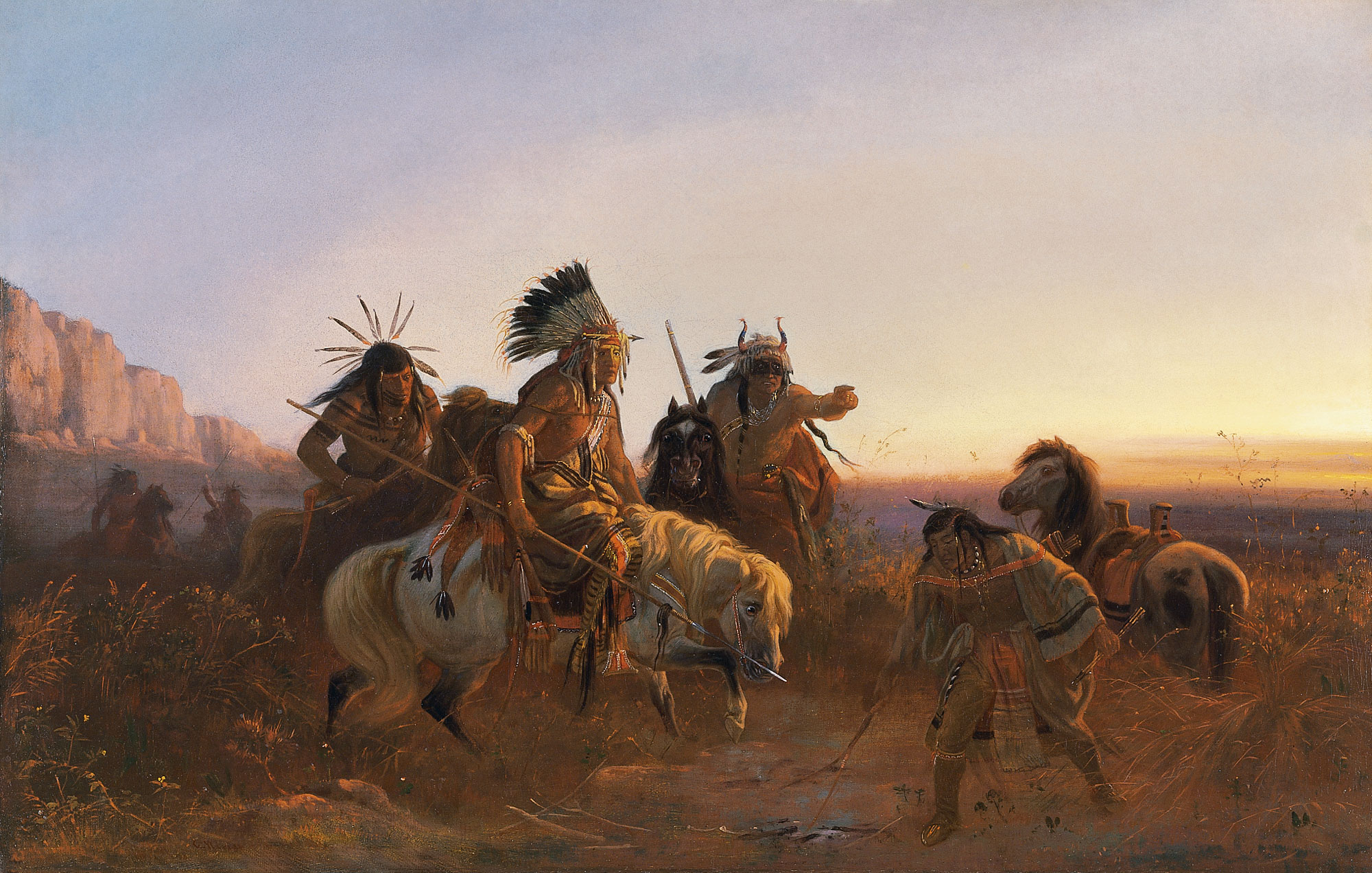
The Lost Trail, Charles Ferdinand Wimar, c. 1856.

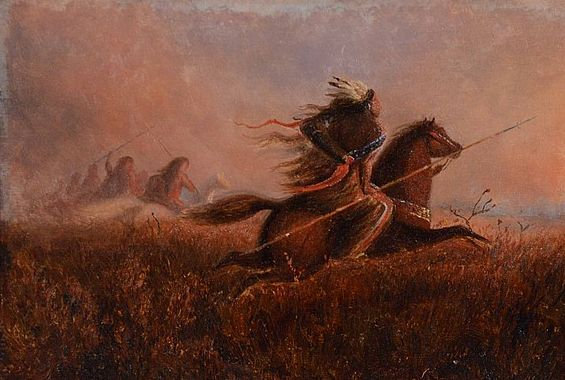
"Indians on the Prairie", Charles Ferdinand Wimar, 1860

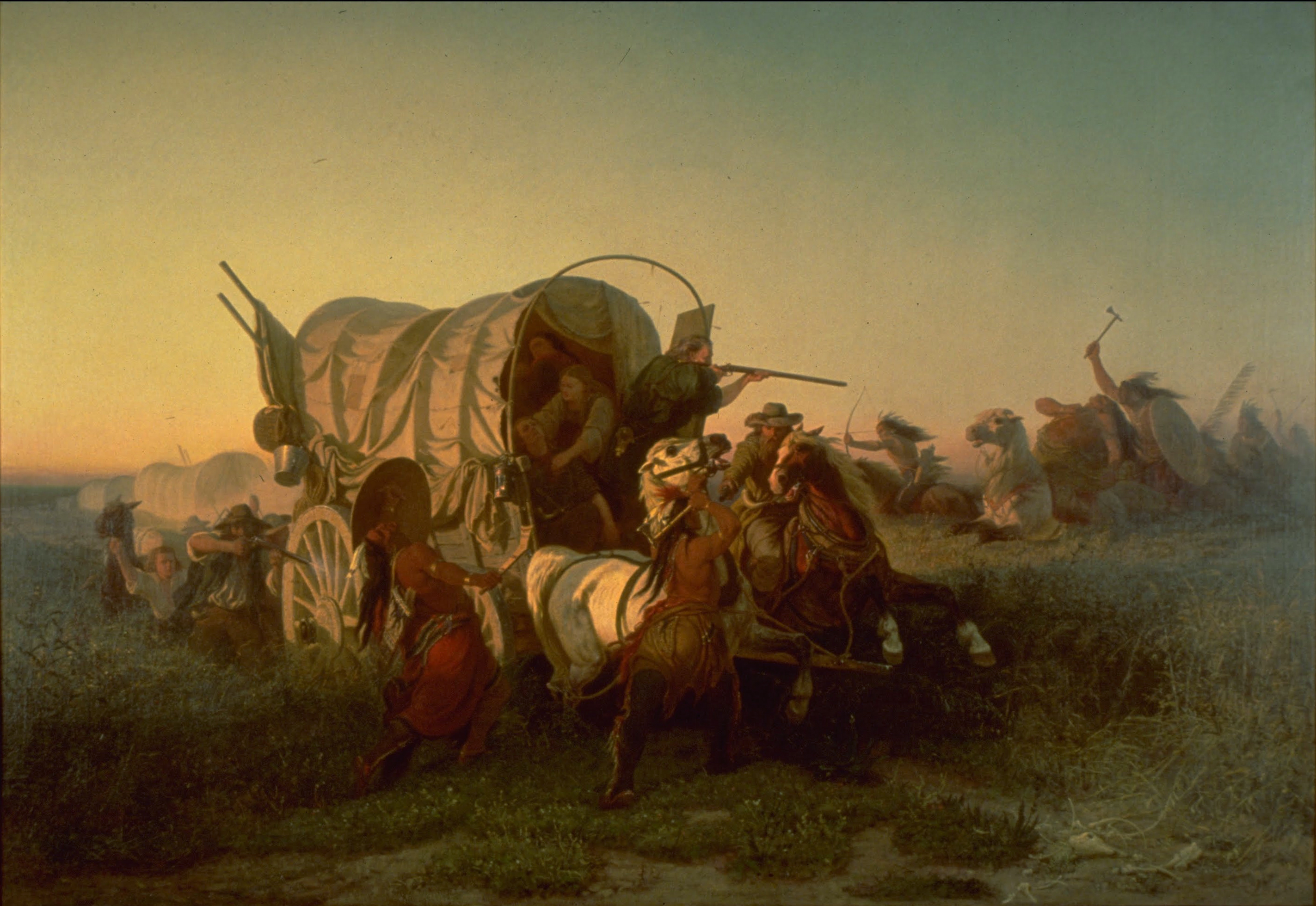
The Attack on an Emigrant Train, at the University of Michigan Museum of Art
