= Daniel Morgan Boone =

American frontiersman (1769–1839)

- Born: December 23, 1769; South Carolina, U.S.
- Died: July 13, 1839 (aged 69); Daniel Morgan Boone farm, Jackson County, Missouri, U.S.
- Resting place: Boone Hays Graveyard
- Occupations: Hunter; soldier; surveyor; merchant; agriculturalist; farmer
- Known for: Son and namesake of Daniel Boone, hunting, scouting, and exploration on the United States frontier, establishing Boone's Lick and the Boonslick Road
- Spouse: Sarah Griffin Lewis (m. 1800)
- Children: John W Boone, 1806–1822; Nathan Boone, 1808–1835; Daniel Boone, 1809–1880; Lindsay Boone, 1811–1834; Edward H Boone, 1813–1860; Elizabeth Levica Boone White, 1815–1850; Alonzo Havington Boone, 1817–1874; James H Boone, 1819–1852; Milton Lindsey Boone, 1820–1820; Cassandra Boone Cosby, 1821–1845; Morgan Boone, 1824–1852; Napoleon Boone, 1828–1850
- Parents: Daniel Boone (father); Rebecca Bryan (mother)
- Relatives: Squire Boone (uncle); Jemima Boone Callaway (sister); Nathan Boone (brother and business partner)

Daniel Morgan Boone (December 23, 1769 – July 13, 1839) was the son of Daniel Boone and a significant American pioneer, explorer, and frontiersman in his own right. He was a particularly key player in the early American exploration and settlement of Missouri.

== Early life and first forays into Missouri ==
Daniel Morgan Boone was born to Daniel and Rebecca Boone in 1769 in South Carolina. He spent most of his early years in Kentucky.

At the age of 18, he struck out on a solitary journey of 30 days for St. Louis, during which it is said he did not see another human being. He spent the subsequent decade trapping and hunting in eastern Missouri and along the Missouri River, preceding Lewis and Clark, who would not depart west from St. Louis until 1804.

If these sources are correct, that means Boone was exploring and trapping in present-day Missouri as early as 1787:

Probably the first white man who came into the territory of Jackson county was Col. Daniel Morgan Boone, a son of old Daniel Boone. He came to St. Louis in 1787, where he was warmly received by the trappers and traders. In a memoir of him written by the late Dr. Johnson Lykins, of this city, it is stated that he spent twelve winters trapping beavers on the Blue, spending his summers in St. Louis. He was married in the year 1800, when he abandoned trapping.

== Leading the Boone Family to settle in French Missouri ==
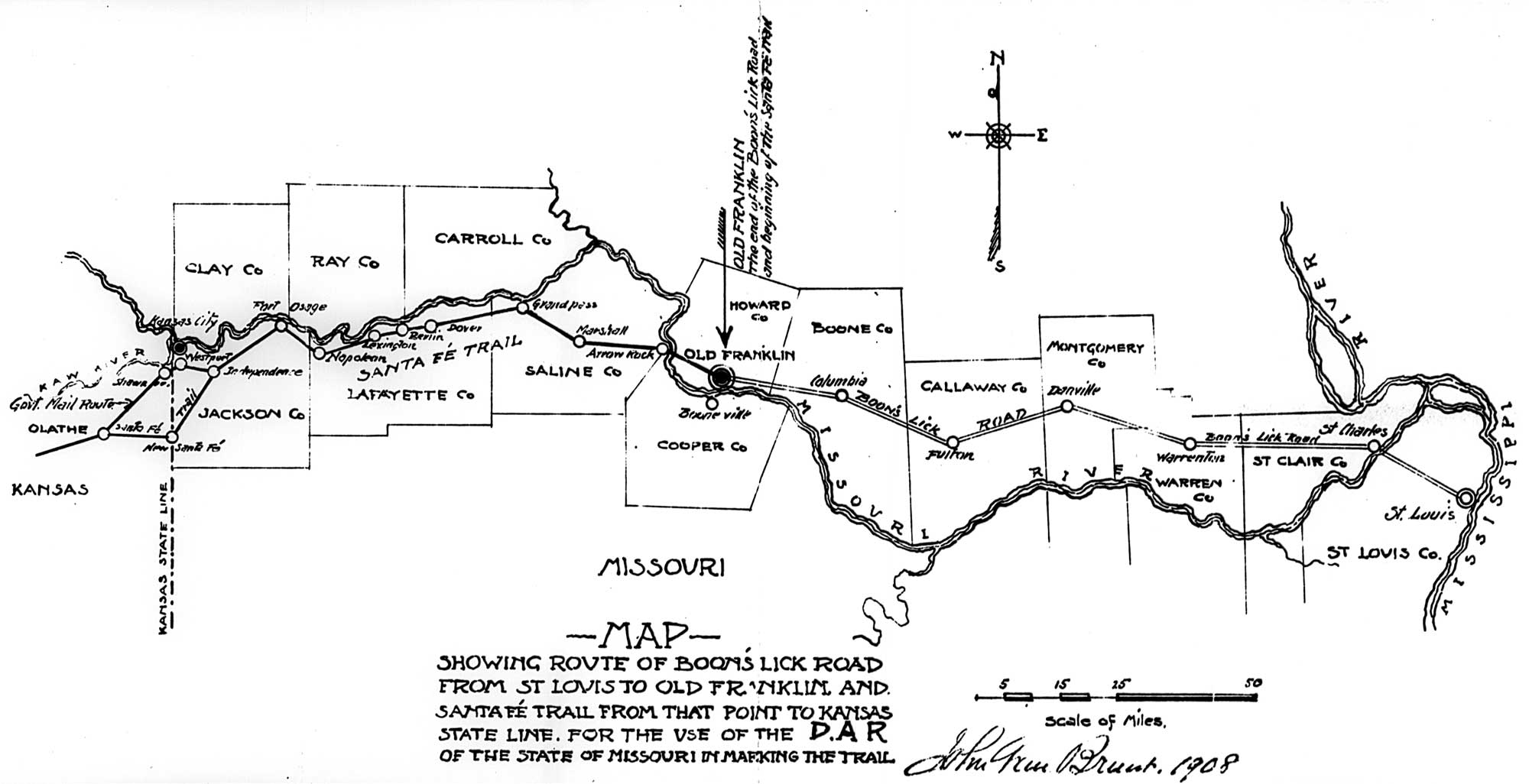
1908 Map of the Boon's Lick Trail across Missouri, and the continuation of the Boon's Lick route via the Santa Fe Trail.

At the behest of his father, Boone visited Missouri in 1797, arranged Spanish Land Grants for himself, his father, and other family members and settlers in the area near present-day Matson, Missouri. Along with his brother Nathan, he expanded the existing Native American trace into the Boon's Lick Road from the Boone settlement in eastern Missouri, along the Missouri River near present-day Matson, Missouri, to a salt spring in central Missouri. This became the primary road used by American settlers as they moved west into central Missouri - the only available road through this area until after the War of 1812. Starting in 1821, the Boon's Lick Road became the conduit from St Louis to the Santa Fe Trail, which ran 900 miles from Boon's Lick Country to Santa Fe, Mexico.

Later he pioneered another road, with a slightly different alignment from Boone settlement that went further west to Fort Osage.

Boone's marriage record, to Sara Griffin Lewis, was discovered in 2015. The marriage took place March 2, 1800, and was conducted by a Spanish priest in St. Charles, Missouri. (At the time, Missouri was Spanish territory.) Both Boone's and Lewis's parents lived in the area and were present for the ceremony.

On the American frontier, Boone participated in a wide variety of ventures - many of them with his brother, Nathan - from the salt refining operation at Boon's Lick to market hunting to an operating large-scale a pine plank lumber, sawmill, and transport operation in the northern Ozarks. The pine planks were a valuable commodity if they could be transported from the Ozarks to the waiting markets along the Mississippi River.

Boone fought in the War of 1812, participating in the fortification-building and general build-up preceding the war. During the war he patrolled the frontier and worked as a spy.

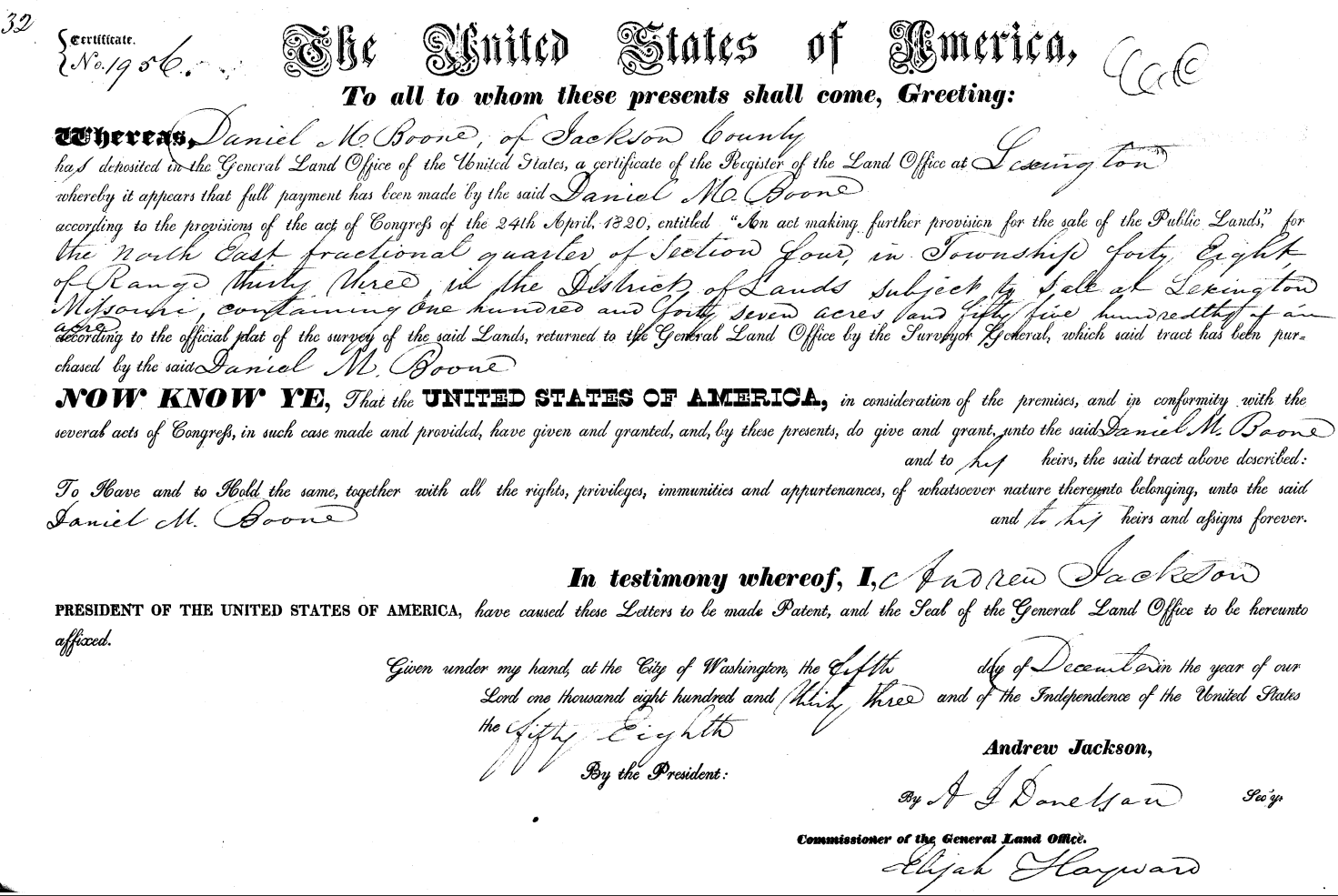
Daniel Morgan Boone Land Patent, present-day Jackson County, Missouri, NE fractional quarter, Section 4, Township 48, Range 33

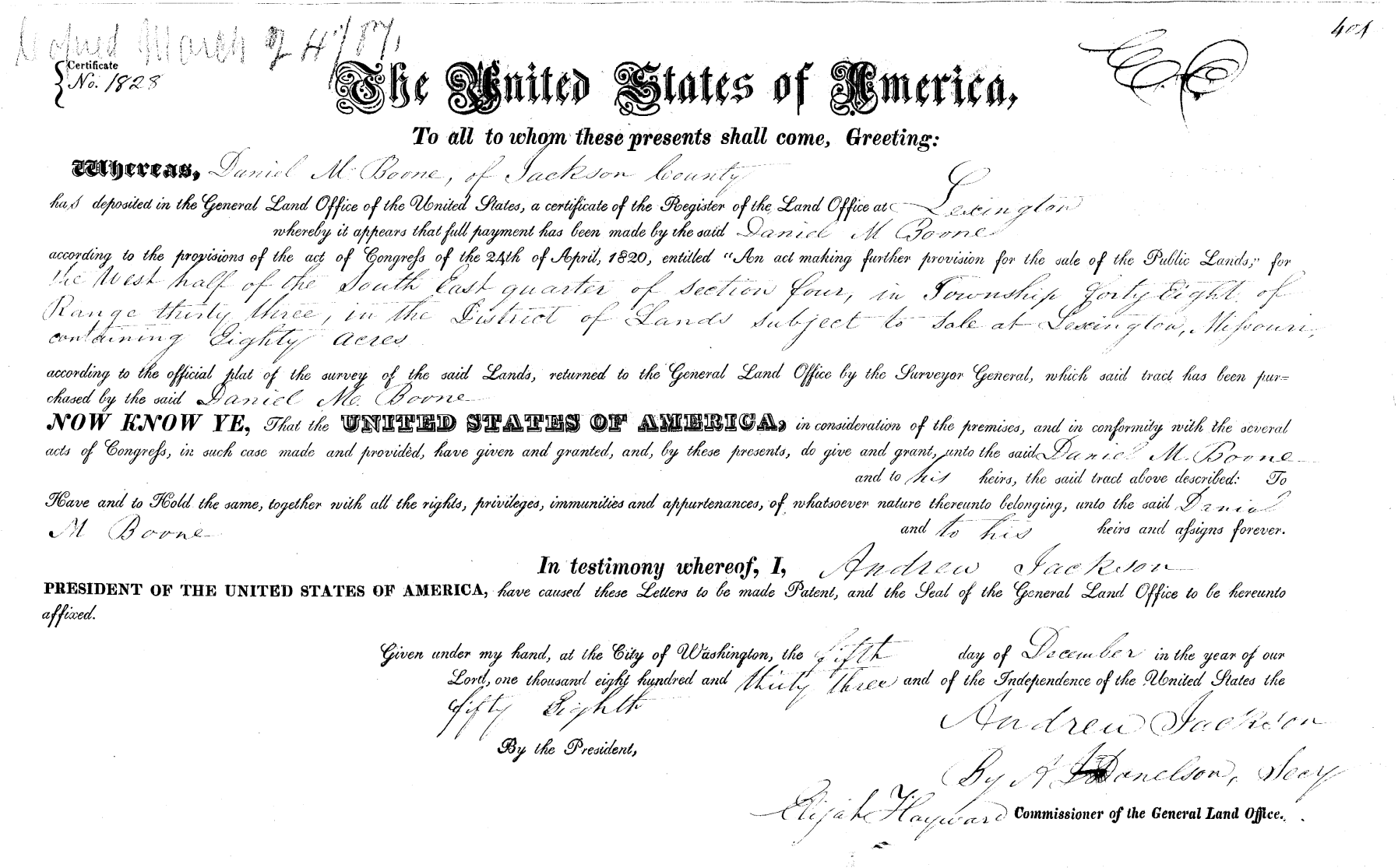
Daniel Morgan Boone Land Patent, present-day Jackson County, Missouri, W 1/2 of SE 1/4 of Section 4, Township 48, Range 33

== Move to Westport and work with Kaw Indian Agency ==
By 1826, Boone had settled on the western side of Missouri in the Westport (Kansas City) area. In 1829 he moved to Kansas Indian Territory as government agriculturalist for the Kaw Indian Agency in present-day Jefferson County, Kansas. This places Boone and his family among very earliest non-Native settlers in Kansas Territory as well.

Boone served on the committee that determined the location of the Missouri capital on the Missouri River bluffs in central Missouri, and laid out the new city - Jefferson City - that was planned there as the state capital. He also surveyed and fixed the Iowa-Missouri state line.

In 1831, Boone patented land in Jackson County, Missouri, where he and his large family owned property and farmed. His land was near present-day 63rd Street and Holmes - where he built a cabin - and near 79th and Holmes in Kansas City, Missouri. Both properties were generally along the Westport Santa Fe Trail route (today's Wornall Road) - one of the major thoroughfares through the area at that time.

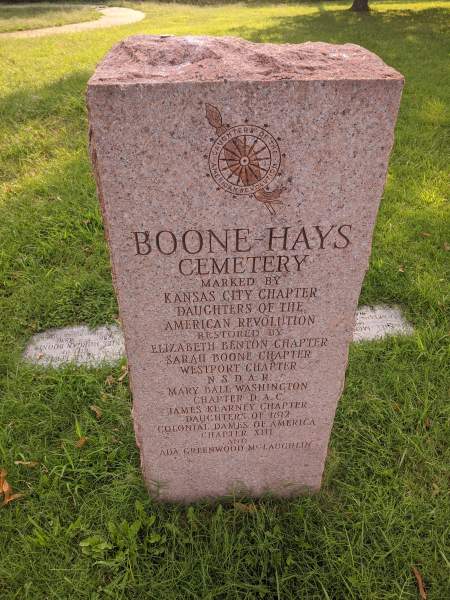
Daniel Morgan and Sarah Lewis Boone historical marker and grave markers at the Boone-Hays Cemetery, Kansas City, Missouri, in 2021. The new grave markers and historical marker were placed in about 2000.

== Death and burial ==
In 1839 Boone died of cholera and was buried on the family farm.

The Boone-Hays Graveyard, near present-day 63rd and Prospect in Kansas City, Missouri, was long neglected. In 2000, local groups organized a clean up of the area and installation of new grave markers and a historical marker. The cemetery and part of the Boone's farm is now a city park with memorials for Boone, his wife, Sara Griffin, and others who were buried there. Many buried in that location were later re-interred at the nearby Forest Hill Calvary Cemetery, though not, as far as records indicate, Morgan Boone or Sarah Lewis Boone.

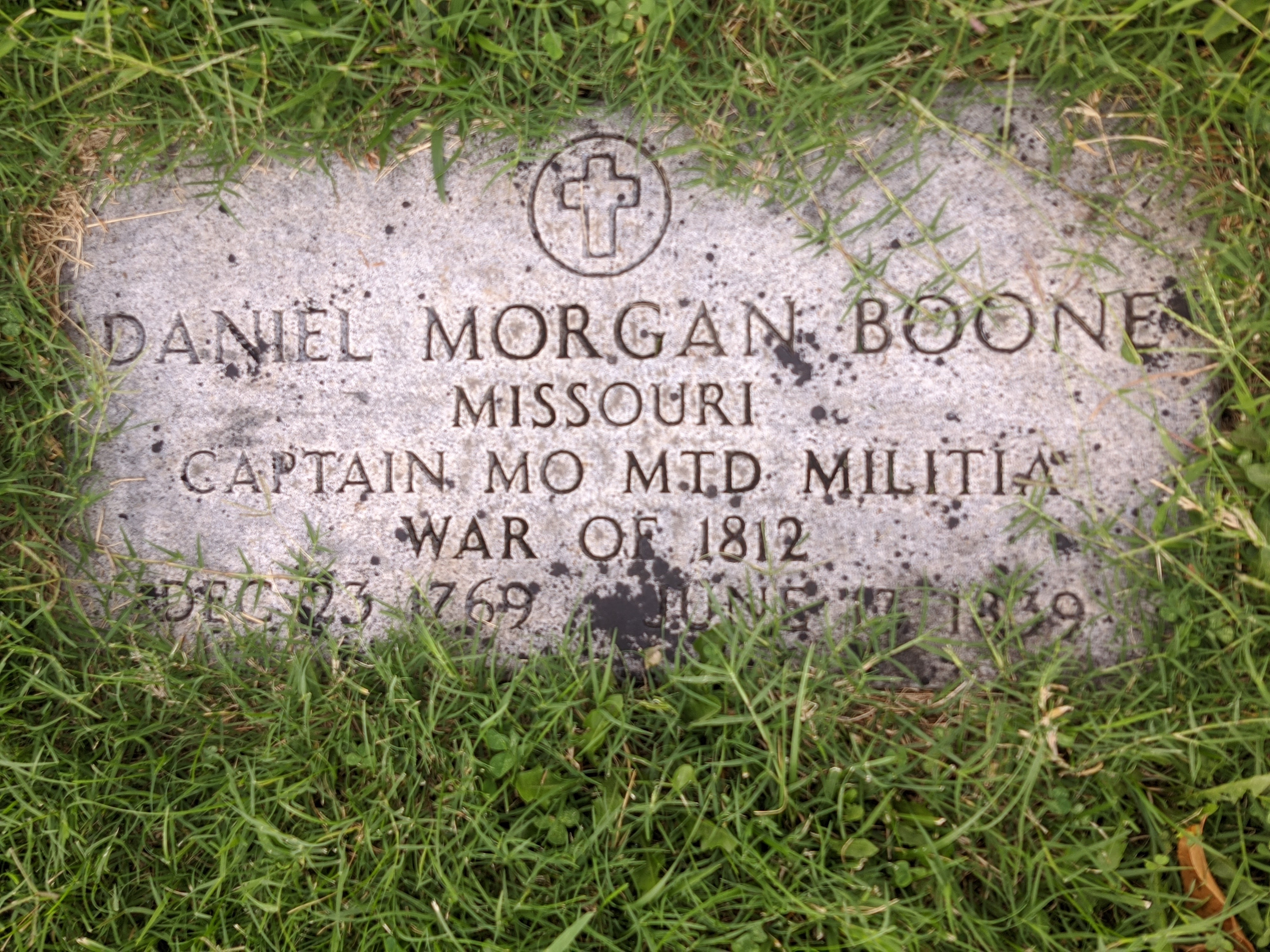
Gravestone of Daniel Morgan Boone, son of Daniel Boone, in the Boone-Hays Graveyard in Kansas City, Missouri

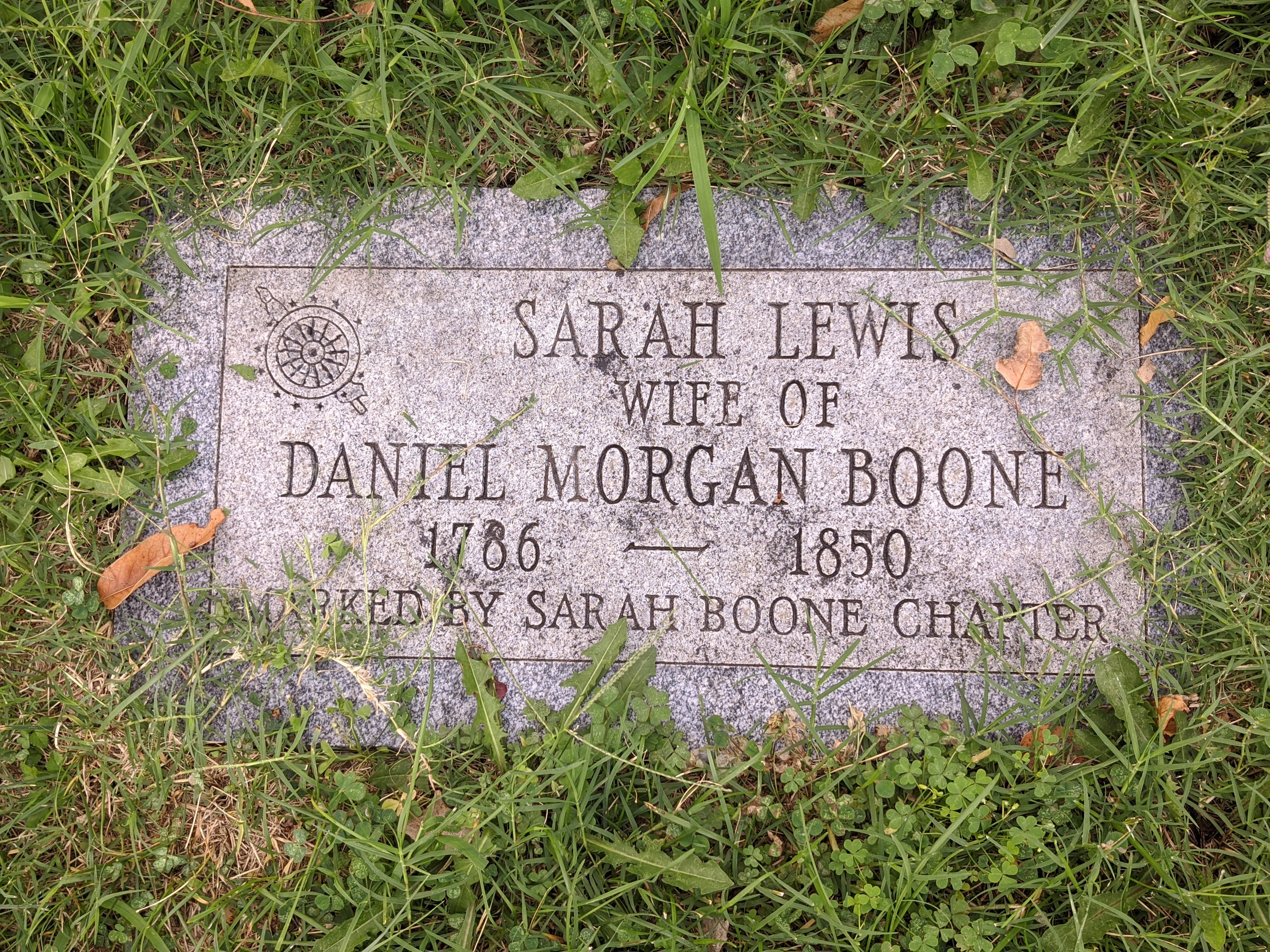
Gravestone of Sarah Lewis Boone, wife of Daniel Morgan Boone, in the Boone-Hays Graveyard in Kansas City, Missouri
