= Annette Kolodny =

American academic (1941–2019)

- Annette Kolodny, 1985.
- Born: August 21, 1941; New York City, U.S.
- Died: September 11, 2019 (aged 78); Tucson, Arizona, U.S.
- Education: Brooklyn College; University of California, Berkeley
- Occupation: Literary critic
- Spouse: Daniel Peters (m. 1970)

Annette Kolodny (August 21, 1941 – September 11, 2019) was an American feminist literary critic and activist, held the position of College of Humanities Professor Emerita of American Literature and Culture at the university of Arizona in Tucson. Her major scholarly writings examined the experiences of women on the American frontiers and the projection of female imagery onto the American landscape. Her other writings examined some aspects of feminism after the 1960s; the revision of dominant themes in American studies; and the problems faced by women and minorities in the American academy.

== Biography ==
Kolodny was born in New York City to Esther Rifkind Kolodny and David Kolodny. She did her undergraduate work at Brooklyn College, from which she graduated Phi Beta Kappa magna cum laude in 1962. After graduation, she took a position on the editorial staff at Newsweek. Kolodny left to return to graduate studies in 1964, citing a desire "to teach people to think critically and because she wanted to be able to publish her own ideas, not merely report the ideas of others." Her M.A. and Ph.D. work were completed at the University of California, Berkeley, and she earned the latter degree in 1969. Her first teaching position at Yale University was cut short as she left after a year to move to Canada with her husband, whose draft board appeal for conscientious objector status for the duration of the Vietnam War was rejected. Finding a position at the University of British Columbia, she helped develop western Canada's first accredited interdisciplinary women's studies program before returning to the United States in 1974 to teach at the University of New Hampshire.

In New Hampshire, she wrote her first major work of feminist eco-criticism, The Lay of the Land: Metaphor as Experience and History in American Life and Letters (1975). While the book got positive reviews and pioneered the field of feminist ecocriticism, Kolodny was denied promotion and tenure in the English Department at the University of New Hampshire. (Richter 1387) Active in the student movements while in Berkeley, she continued to advocate for the right to establish a program in women's studies. She later sued the University of New Hampshire charging sex discrimination and anti-Semitism. She settled with the "largest financial award in history in a case of this kind". She used this money to establish the Legal Fund of the Task Force on Discrimination for the National Women's Studies Association (NWSA), an organization she had helped found, and served as director of the task force from 1980 to 1985. The Task Force is now renamed Feminists Against Academic Discrimination within the NWSA.

Kolodny taught at several universities, including the University of Maryland and Rensselaer Polytechnic Institute before being named Dean of the College of Humanities at the University of Arizona in Tucson. Following her tenure as dean, which spanned from 1988 to 1993, Kolodny was named College of Humanities Professor of American Literature and Culture at the University of Arizona. She was a professor emerita of Comparative Cultural and Literary Studies at the University of Arizona in Tucson.

In 1993 she was elected to lifetime membership in the Norwegian Academy of Science and Letters.

Her books won many awards both in the United States and abroad. Over the course of her scholarly career, Kolodny has received grants and fellowships from the National Endowment for the Humanities, the Ford Foundation, the Guggenheim Foundation, the Rockefeller Humanities Fellowship, and others. She retired from the University of Arizona in July 2007, but continued working as a consultant in higher education policy issues and as a scholar of American literature and culture. She died on September 11, 2019, in Tucson, Arizona.

== Works ==
Kolodny's first two books were The Lay of the Land: Metaphor as Experience and History in American Life and Letters (University of North Carolina Press, 1975) and The Land Before Her: Fantasy and Experience of the American Frontiers, 1630-1860 (University of North Carolina Press, 1984); both of these texts deal with environmental concerns and the historic destruction of the land (Jay 217). Based on her experience as a senior administrator in higher education, Kolodny published Failing the Future: A Dean Looks at Higher Education in the Twenty-First Century (Duke University Press, 1998), which "details the extent to which women and non-white students are still outsiders on American campuses." The book also examines the status of the humanities disciplines in higher education, the value of tenure, and the need for family friendly policies on campus. It is a book about needed educational innovations in the 21st century.

Kolodny is also well known for two essays published in 1980: "Dancing Through the Minefield: Some Observations on the Theory, Practice, and Politics of a Feminist Literary Criticism" (Feminist Studies, Spring 1980) and "A Map for Re-Reading: Gender and the Interpretation of Literary Texts" (New Literary History, Spring 1980). Of these, "Dancing Through the Minefield" is the most well-known, and has been called "the most reprinted essay of American feminist literary criticism". It has been translated and reprinted worldwide.

In 2007, Kolodny published a long-lost masterpiece of Native American literature, Joseph Nicolar's The Life and Traditions of the Red Man (Duke University Press), originally published in 1893. Nicolar's work traces the history of his people, the Penobscot Nation, from the first moments of creation through the arrival of the white man. Kolodny's reprint of this important work includes a history of the Penobscot Nation and an interpretive introduction to the text. It was stipulated that the royalties from this text go to the Penobscot. In 2012, Kolodny published In Search of First Contact: The Vikings of Vinland, the Peoples of the Dawnland, and the Anglo-American Anxiety of Discovery (Duke University Press). The book examines both Native American and Euroamerican stories of first contacts between the peoples of the New and Old Worlds. It examines the competition between Leif Eiriksson and Christopher Columbus for the title of "first discoverer". Indian Country Today named it as one of the 12 most important books in Native American Studies published in 2012. The Western Literature Association awarded the book the Thomas Lyon Prize as "the best book in Western literary and cultural studies published in 2012".

=== Literary theory and criticism ===
==== Landscape symbolism and ecofeminism ====
===== The Lay of the Land: Metaphor As Experience and History in American Life and Letters =====
In her first book, The Lay of the Land, Kolodny explores the colonization of America, both in reality and in the realm of metaphor. She examines "the continued repetition of the land-as-woman symbolization in American life and letters" (Kolodny, ix). The projection of female imagery onto the landscape was essential to its colonization, she argued; in her introduction, she asks, "was there perhaps a need to experience the land as a nurturing, giving maternal breast because of the threatening, alien, and potentially emasculating terror of the unknown?" (9) By construing the land as female, she argued, it was possible for the colonists to remove some of the terror and mystery from an unknown land. Instead, it became either a nurturing maternal figure, existing to provide sustenance, or a passive virginal figure, existing only to be dominated, sexually or otherwise. With these metaphors firmly in sight, the colonists had a framework through which to view the vast stretches of North America as less alien and terrifying. Through an examination of several male writers, such as Philip Freneau, James Fenimore Cooper, and John James Audubon, Kolodny pursues the implications of this metaphorically female land.

Different chapters of the book correspond to different chronological eras after the discovery and colonization of the Americas and to different metaphorical mindsets as manifested in the writings of the authors considered. In chapter 2, "Surveying the Virgin Land: The Documents of Exploration and Colonization, 1500–1740", the comparison of the land to an untouched, virginal paradise begins the exploration. Chapter 3, "Laying Waste Her Fields of Plenty: The Eighteenth Century", discusses the romanticized agrarian and pastoral ideals that coloured the view of America, especially in its comparisons to ideal lands like Elysium and Arcadia, and the consequences that arose from such ideals, such as the exploitation and alteration of the land. Chapter 4, "Singing Her Past and Singing Her Praises: The Nineteenth Century", examines the dual images of Mother and Mistress in the land, as well as the frustration of the pastoral impulse with the closing of the American frontier and the victory of the industrialized North in the American Civil War. Finally, chapter 5, "Making It with Paradise: The Twentieth Century", deals with the increase of industrialization and the yearning both "to return to and to master the beautiful and bountiful femininity of the new continent." (139)

Freudian and psychoanalytic influences are apparent in this text, especially in the "psychosexual dynamic of a virginal paradise" (Kolodny, Land Before Her, 3). It also has tones of ecofeminism.

===== The Land Before Her: Fantasy and Experience of the American Frontiers, 1630-1860 =====
In the preface to this book, Kolodny states that "[t]he purpose of this study is to chart women's private responses to the successive American frontiers and to trace a tradition of women's public statements about the west." (Kolodny, Land Before Her, xi) Thus, she approaches the same topic as that of Lay of the Land ("landscape as a symbolic…realm" [xii]), but from a different direction. In the writings she examined, she noticed a different theme from that of the male writers:

Like their husbands and fathers, women too shared in economic motives behind emigration; and like the men, women also dreamed of transforming the wilderness. But the emphases were different…Avoiding for a time male assertions of a rediscovered Eden, women claimed the frontiers as a potential sanctuary for an idealized domesticity. Massive exploitation and alteration of the continent do not seem to have been a part of women's fantasies. They dreamed, more modestly, of locating a home and a familial human community within a cultivated garden. (xii–xiii)

There is little sense of the conquering-of-the-frontier mentality that Kolodny discovered in the male writers she discussed in Lay of the Land. There were no triumphant heroes of the order of Daniel Boone or Davy Crockett; rather, the narratives of these women focused on the triumph of domesticity and order in a wild land.

The book is organized chronologically, in much the same way as Lay of the Land. The first section is titled "Book One: From Captivity to Accommodation, 1630-1833", and traces the writings of and about women as they moved from captivity both literal (Mary Rowlandson's account of being captured by Native Americans) and figurative (the sense of being forcibly confined in a new and strange land) to adaptation in the form of survival skills, such as those reputedly possessed by Rebecca Boone, the wife of Daniel Boone. Book two, "From Promotion to Literature, 1833–1850", follows attempts to encourage women to move westward by male writers to western narratives by the women themselves. The third and final section, "Book Three: Repossessing Eden, 1850–1860", documents the attempts by women to create a familiar order in a still unfamiliar country.

===== Ecofeminism =====
Both of these books relate to a subgenre of feminism called ecological feminism or ecofeminism, a social and political doctrine that posits a relationship between the subjugation of women and the destruction of nature. Ecofeminists theorize that a culture based on dominating women is directly connected to social ideals that promote the environmental abuse of the earth.

These two books have a connection to ecofeminism, particularly Lay of the Land. The feminization of the land and the images of the earth as a passive, giving female figure show the social ideas that ecofeminism protests against. Likewise, The Land Before Her exemplifies the same ideas from a different point of view in the ideal of the domestic garden, or the altering of nature.

==== "Dancing Through the Minefield" ====
Perhaps her best known work, Kolodny's 1980 essay "Dancing Through the Minefield" was the "first work to attempt both a survey of the first ten years of feminist literary inquiry and an analysis of the informing theoretical propositions". It has been the subject of criticism in the years since its initial publication, but can still be seen as a guide to "feminist concerns and methodologies."

===== Social constructionism =====
Kolodny emphasizes Social constructionism in this essay, although she herself never uses the term. Briefly, social constructionism is a school of thought that involves looking at the ways social phenomena are created, by people. (See full article on Social constructionism) Using this theory, social entities are seen as always being in a state of change as society itself changes, and the relationships of the entities change. "[T]hings in the world … are the products of ongoing social processes of interaction, and thus do not have fixed or inherent meanings."

In "Dancing Through the Minefield", Kolodny applies this theory to the literary canon, those works of literature that are considered appropriate for study. But such a canon is formed by critics whose values of aestheticism are not neutral. The critical interpretation is formed by the interaction between two objects: the text and the reader. According to Kolodny, the reader's ability to read any given text is shaped by the social conventions and assumptions of their time and place; Reading becomes a social product. But neither is the text pure; it is also moulded by social relations and customs. So any critical interpretation is necessarily a product of two forms of social construction. "Readers and texts are both made — and they are continually being remade." The dynamic nature of both texts and readers must be taken into consideration when examining any text, or the established criticism of that text.

===== Theory =====
Kolodny's essay has a clear theoretical outline. In light of the social constructionist view that aesthetic values, as assigned to the literary canon, are in actuality the products of social conventions and values, Kolodny claims that feminist criticism should "discover how aesthetic value is assigned in the first place" (Kolodny 2147) and then assess the socially-constructed reading patterns that lead to those value judgements. "Having become embroiled in value disagreements, feminism should consider the processes underlying value judgements." "Dancing Through the Minefield" outlines a three-part nucleus assumed by most contemporary feminist literary critics to be essential. First, any construction of a literary canon is a social construction; second, readers unconsciously engage texts from a certain point-of-view; and third, this unconscious bias present in all readers must be consciously and critically re-examined.

First, she writes, "literary history…is a fiction." (Kolodny 2153) This refers to the traditional formation of the literary canon and literary history as a social construction. Literary histories define the major, minor, and ignored texts according to their own social values and conventions, not out of any inherent aesthetic value on the text itself. For example, the western literary canon has been largely created by well-educated white men, and the focus of the canon is therefore on works by well-educated white men. It embodied, as well as upheld, the dominant ideology of the time, and had implications beyond aesthetic values. To give preference to texts by this group was to ignore texts created by other social groups. In recent years, the monolithic nature of the canon has been challenged, and works by previously ignored sections of the literary world (women, homosexuals, and ethnic minorities) have gained some footholds in the canon.

Secondly, readers of texts "engage…not texts but paradigms." (2155) Just as texts and canons are socially constructed, so are the vantage points from which readers engage with any given text. This was also mentioned by Stanley Fish, who called these vantage points interpretive communities. Kolodny states that "we appropriate meaning from a text…according the critical assumptions or predispositions (conscious or not) that we bring to it." (2155)

Finally, Kolodny "strives to undo the unconsciousness of the reader identified" in the second part of her theory:

Since the grounds upon which we assign aesthetic value to texts are never infallible, unchangeable, or universal, we must re-examine not only our aesthetics but, as well, the inherent biases and assumptions informing the critical methods which (in part) shape our aesthetic responses. (Kolodny 2158)

These three general theoretical principles are then supported by the concept of pluralism. Pluralism in this context refers to a conscious effort not to limit oneself to a single critical approach when reading a text. Rather, the object of pluralism is to make use of multiple critical approaches and to get a fuller appreciation of the variety of meanings which can be present in a single text. Kolodny specifically refers to a feminist pluralism, which validates "multiple interpretations of various texts" according to the usefulness of a pluralistic view of a text. This method of reading would give equality to different approaches as well as allow critical examinations of those same approaches, which in turn helps create the "broad critical awareness" advocated by Kolodny's third principle as outlined above.

The essay emphasizes the real situation of contemporary women. Kolodny believes that feminism and women's studies should not be confined to books or classrooms. "[I]deas are important because they determine the ways we live, or want to live, in the world" (Kolodny 2164); ideas are therefore not meant to exist in a vacuum. Rather, they must be taken into the world through activism.

===== Criticism =====
Several authors have criticized "Dancing Through the Minefield". The most well-known of these criticisms appeared in a collaborative article Kolodny wrote with Judith Gardiner, Elly Bulkin, and Rena Patterson entitled "An Interchange on Feminist Criticism: On 'Dancing Through the Minefield'", which was published in the journal Feminist Studies in 1983.

Both Bulkin and Patterson believe that Kolodny, while speaking to women in her essay, is only speaking to a certain group of women — those who are white, middle class, and heterosexual. Patterson states that "despite its language and intent, [the essay]…represents classist, white, and heterosexist attitudes which are common in feminist literary criticism and which contradict the best of feminist thought and the aims of the women's movement" (Patterson, 654). This is a common criticism of second-wave feminism: that it tended to ignore the problems of non-white and non-heterosexual women in favor of a homogenized white heterosexual feminist culture. However, Kolodny's advocacy of the concept of pluralism may offset this claim. While she does not specify that alternative critical approaches should come from different ethnicities or sexualities, there is no reason why they could not and such inclusion would only increase the scope of the "broad critical awareness" mentioned above.

Gardiner, on the other hand, disagrees with Kolodny about the use of pluralism. While there can be no single ideology to which all feminist theories belong, Gardiner writes, there are some strong ideological concepts that define areas of feminism. Examples of this would include liberal feminism, socialist feminism, and ecofeminism. In Gardiner's view, the strong ideological beliefs shared by these groups would "limit their susceptibility to pluralism." (Gardiner 634)

==== Failing the Future: A Dean Looks at Higher Education in the Twenty-First Century ====
Kolodny's 1998 book is not a work of literary criticism, but rather one of institutional criticism. After serving as dean of Humanities for five years at the University of Arizona, Kolodny wrote this book in order to outline some of the problems facing academic institutions. These include the ability of legislators and administrators to make uninformed decisions about budget cuts without realizing the effect of such cuts on quality education; a myriad of problems about tenure and promotions processes, which Kolodny believes still reflect an attitude antagonistic to women or ethnic minorities; a problem with anti-feminist and anti-intellectual harassment; the lack of support available for students with children; the extent to which women and non-whites are still considered outsiders on university campuses; and the effect of an outdated curriculum in the face of greater demographic diversity and changing student learning needs. She outlines a number of changes which can be made to improve conditions and, realizing that any substantial change will require equally substantial money, encourages government reinvestment in higher education.

== Sources ==
- "Annette Kolodny." Leitch, Vincent B., ed. The Norton Anthology of Theory and Criticism. New York: W.W. Norton and Company, 2001, pp. 2143–2146.
- Gardiner, Judith, Elly Bulkin, Rena Patterson, and Annette Kolodny. "An Interchange on Feminist Criticism: 'On Dancing Through the Minefield.'" Feminist Studies v.8 (3) 1983.
- Groden, Michael, and Martin Kreiswirth, eds. The Johns Hopkins Guide to Literary Theory and Criticism. Baltimore: The Johns Hopkins University Press, 1994.
- Jay, Gregory, ed. Dictionary of Literary Biography. Detroit: Gale Research Company, 1988.
- Kolodny, Annette. "Dancing Through the Minefield: Some Observations on the Theory, Practice, and Politics of Feminist Literary Criticism." The Norton Anthology of Theory and Criticism. Vincent B. Leitch, ed. New York: W.W. Norton and Company, 2001.
- Kolodny, Annette. Failing the Future: A Dean Looks at Higher Education in the Twenty-first Century. Durham: Duke University Press, 1998.
- Kolodny, Annette. The Land Before Her: Fantasy and Experience of the American Frontiers, 1630-1860. Chapel Hill: University of North Carolina Press, 1984.
- Kolodny, Annette. The Lay of the Land: Metaphor as Experience and History in American Life and Letters. Chapel Hill: University of North Carolina Press, 1975.
- Richter, David, ed. Critical Tradition. New York: Bedford/ St. Martin's, 1998.

== See also ==
- Ecofeminism
- Feminism
- Higher Education
- Literary Criticism
- Second-wave feminism
- Social constructionism
