= Squire Boone Caverns =

Tourist attraction in Indiana, United States

Coordinates: 38.06506°N 86.13407°W

Squire Boone Caverns and Village is a cavern exploration attraction in Mauckport, Indiana (near Corydon in Southern Indiana). The park consists of a one-hour walking tour into the caverns, as well as a working pioneer village and grist mill.

== Park's history ==
The cave was first discovered by Daniel Boone and his brother, Squire Boone, as they were hiding from Indians in the late 18th century. Squire would come back later to purchase the land and live near the caves in 1808 and start a grist mill at the site. The mill is on the Indiana Register of Historic Sites and Structures and still operates today. Squire Boone died in 1815 and, having so loved the caverns, requested to be buried in them, and was buried near the entrance to the cave. His remains were moved in the 20th century because of construction near his burial site and its continual disturbance by relic hunters. The coffin, which contained only bones, was moved deep into the caverns. The cave tour passes by the coffin and there are benches to rest and contemplate the cave and the coffin.

== The park ==
The caverns are open year-round, while the village and grist mill are open only during the summer months. The pioneer village includes an old fashion candy shop, a building where soap is made from lard, a chandlers house where candles are made by hand dipping, and a country store. The products made in the village are marketed nationally and can be purchased in many parts of the country including Disney World. Everything made in the village is done the "old fashioned way", by hand.

The company which owns the caverns also run the Squire Boone Caverns' factory in New Albany, just off I-265, where many items are mass-produced.

=== Cave tour ===
The tour of the cave is conducted by experienced guides on lighted walkways with minimal stairs. The tour starts from the space between the General Store and “Barnyard” petting zoo with pigs, sheep, and goats. There is a door in the back of the ‘Cave Cabin’ that leads to the exit, a vertical shaft that was excavated in 1970, with a 73 step circular stairway that leads out of the cave. As of 2015, the man-made entrance shaft, only 45 years old, has begun to grow features like the rest of the cave.

The cave's tour includes such sights as an underground stream whose outlet is the stream that runs the grist mill, and source is a stream that goes into a sinkhole in nearby Laconia, massive stalactite and stalagmite formations (which are not to be touched), a large open central cavern, several narrow areas, a large underground waterfall, several interesting rock formations, and near the end the coffin of Squire Boone. The stream also has an impressive rimstone formation, the largest in North America and the second or third largest in the world.

== Gallery ==
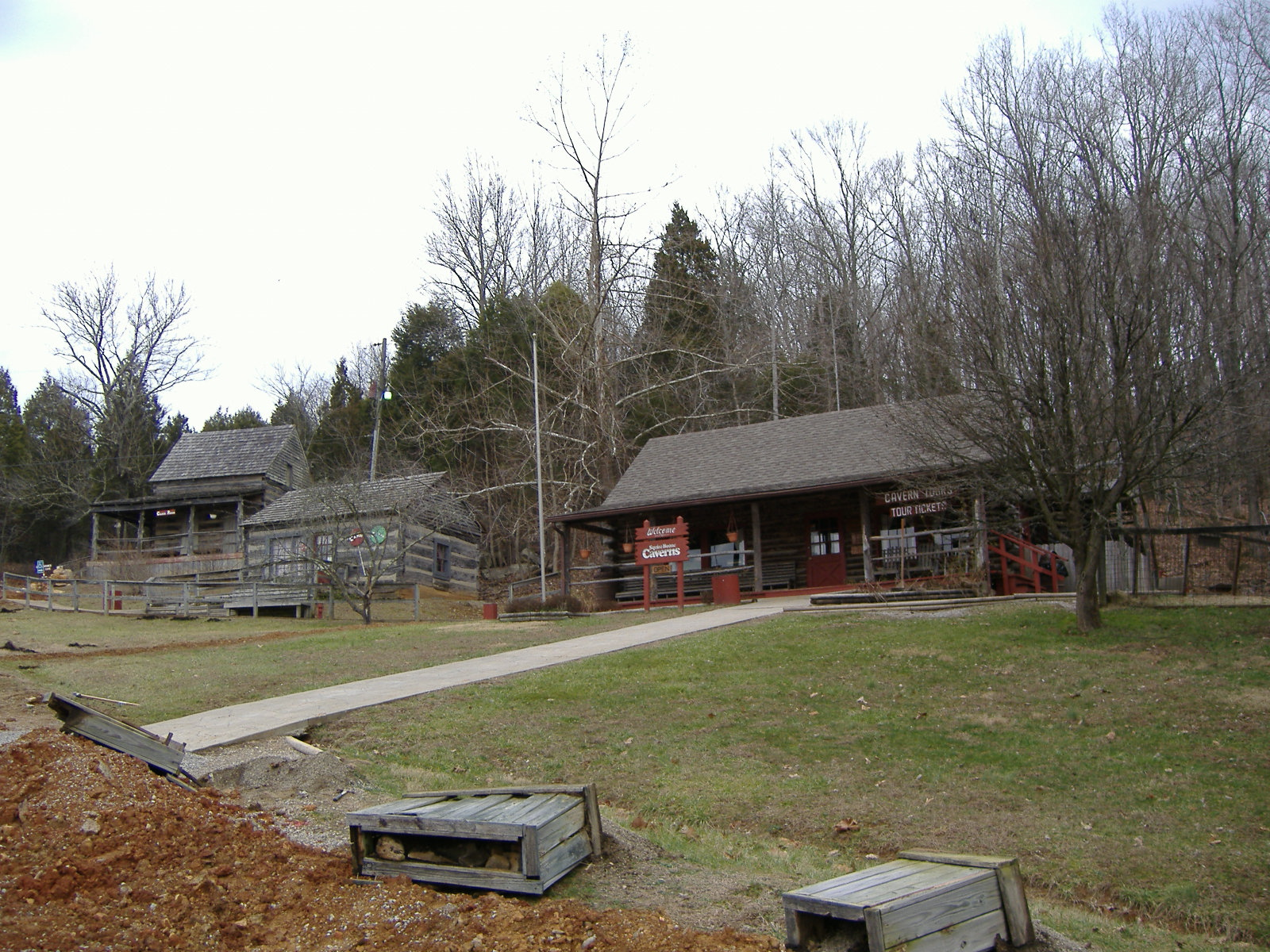
The village.

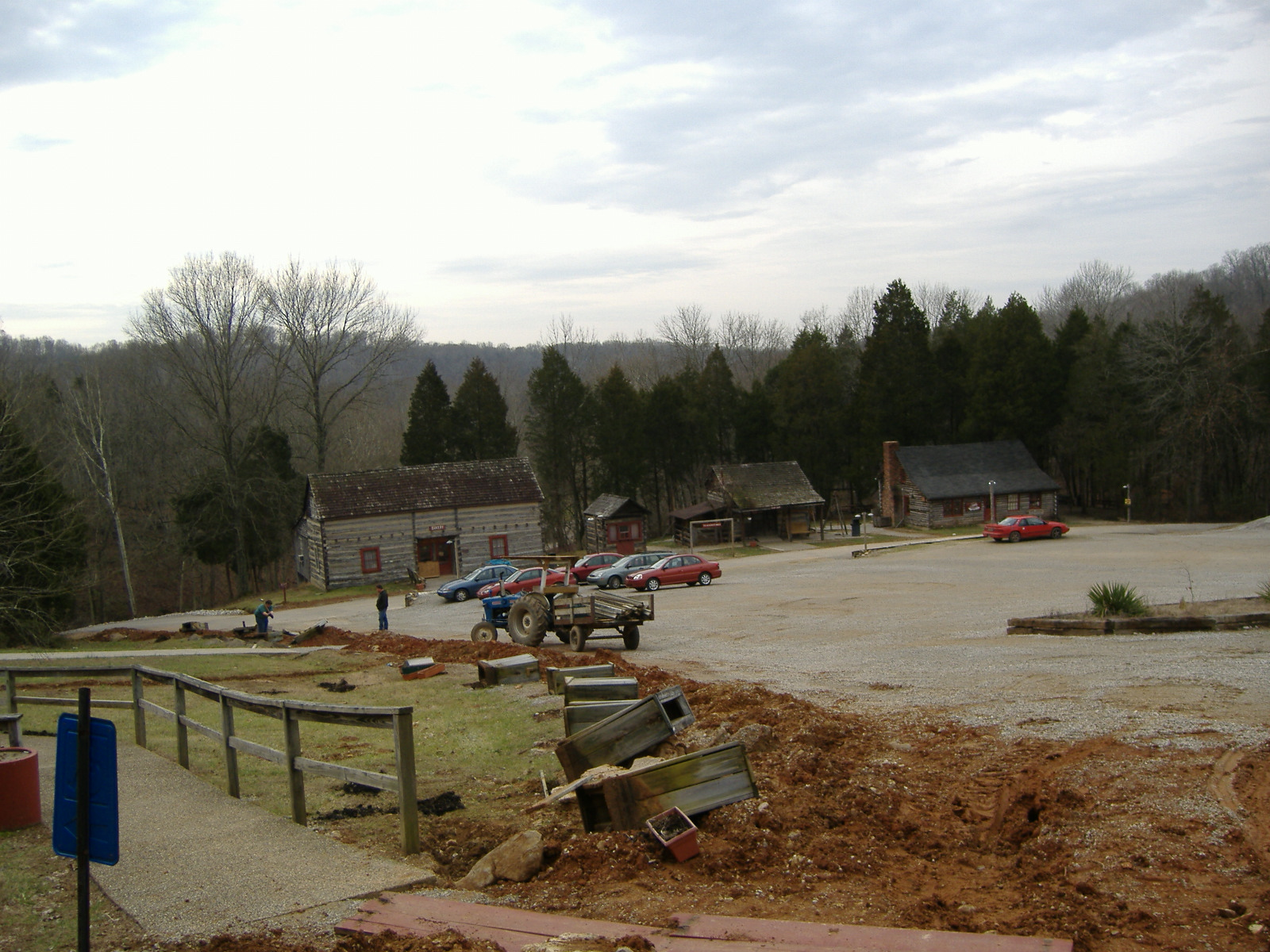
The village.

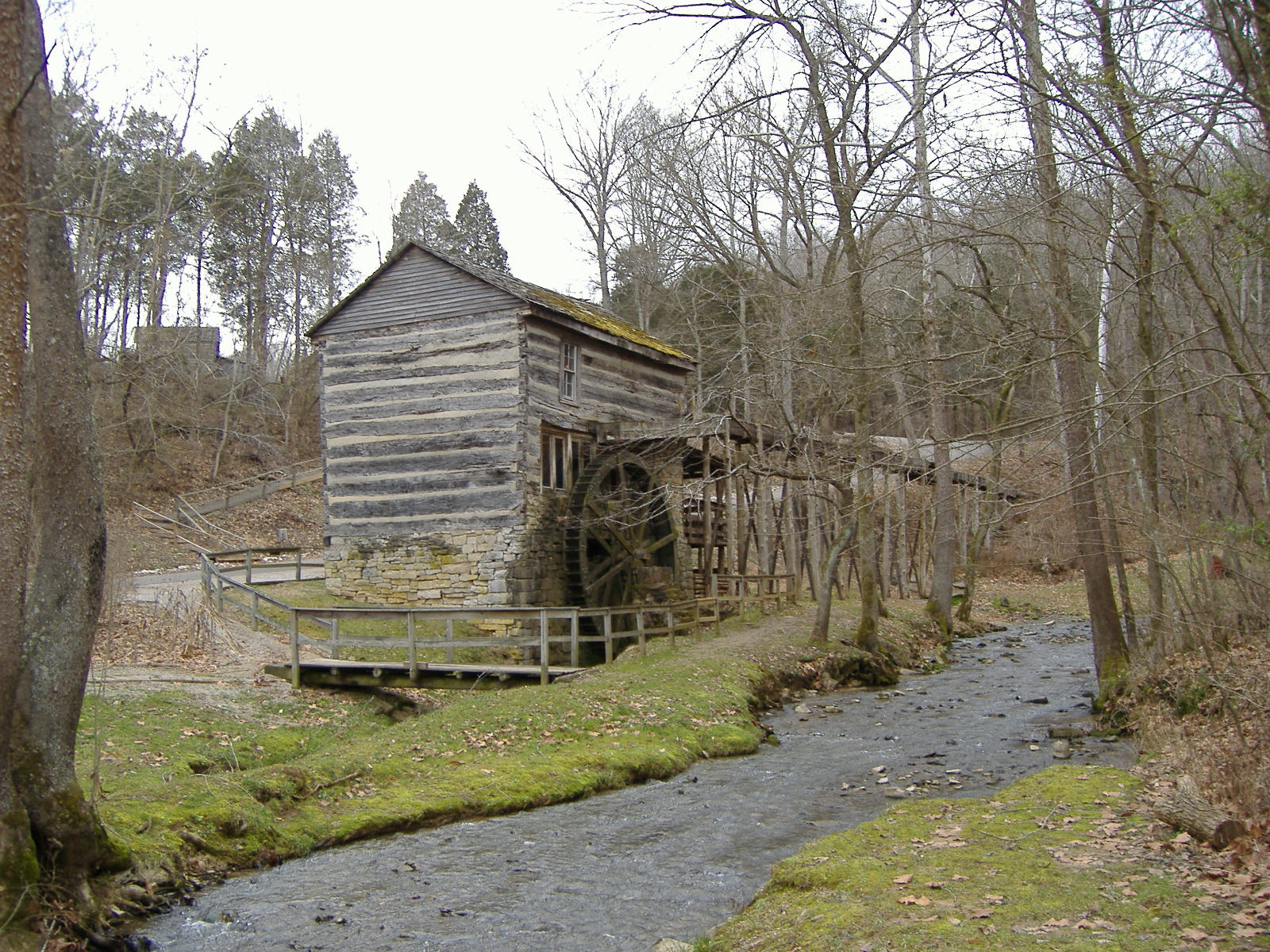
View of the gristmill from the entrance of the park.

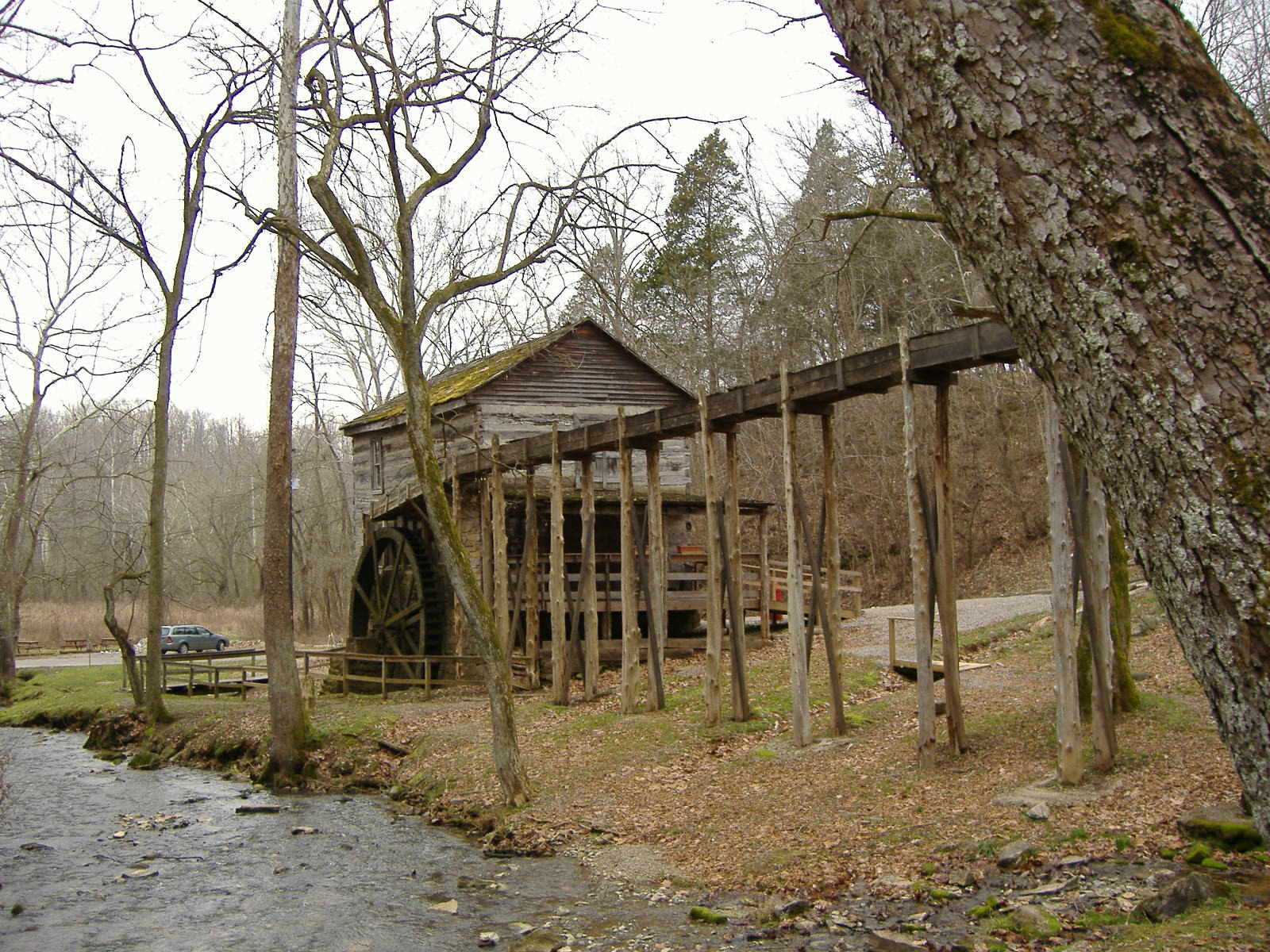
View of the gristmill from upstream.

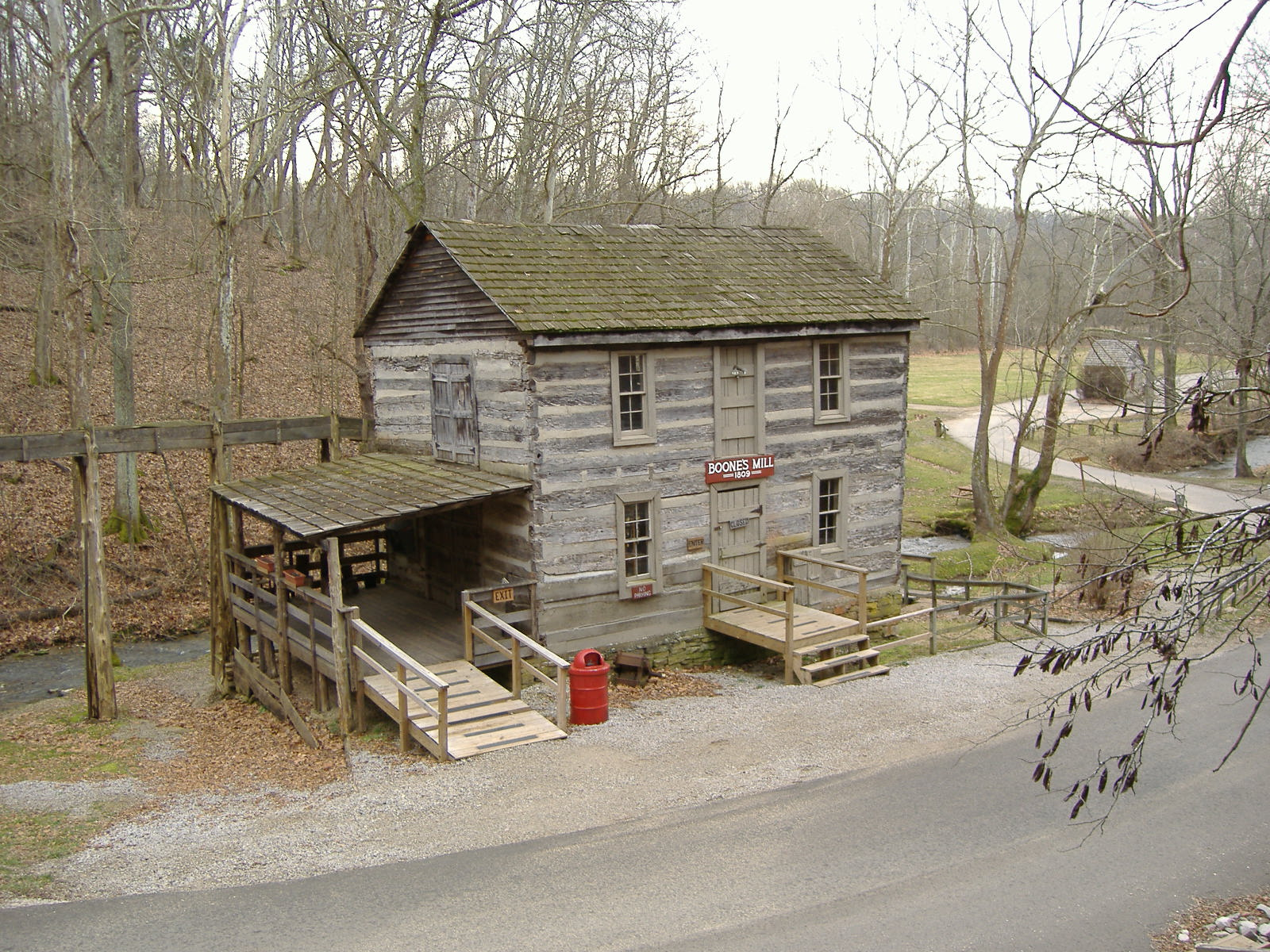
View of the gristmill from the front.

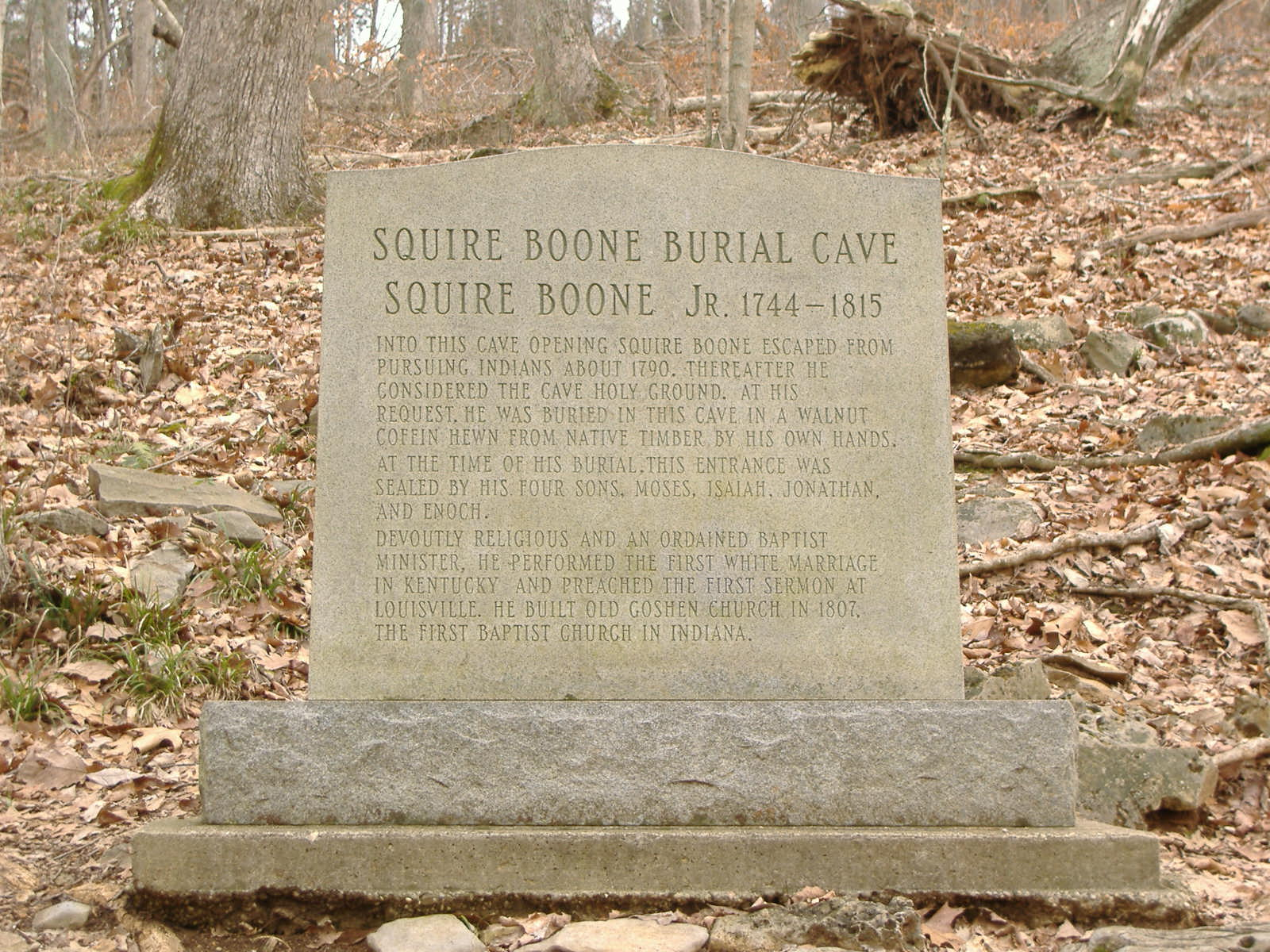
Marker at Boone's original burial site.

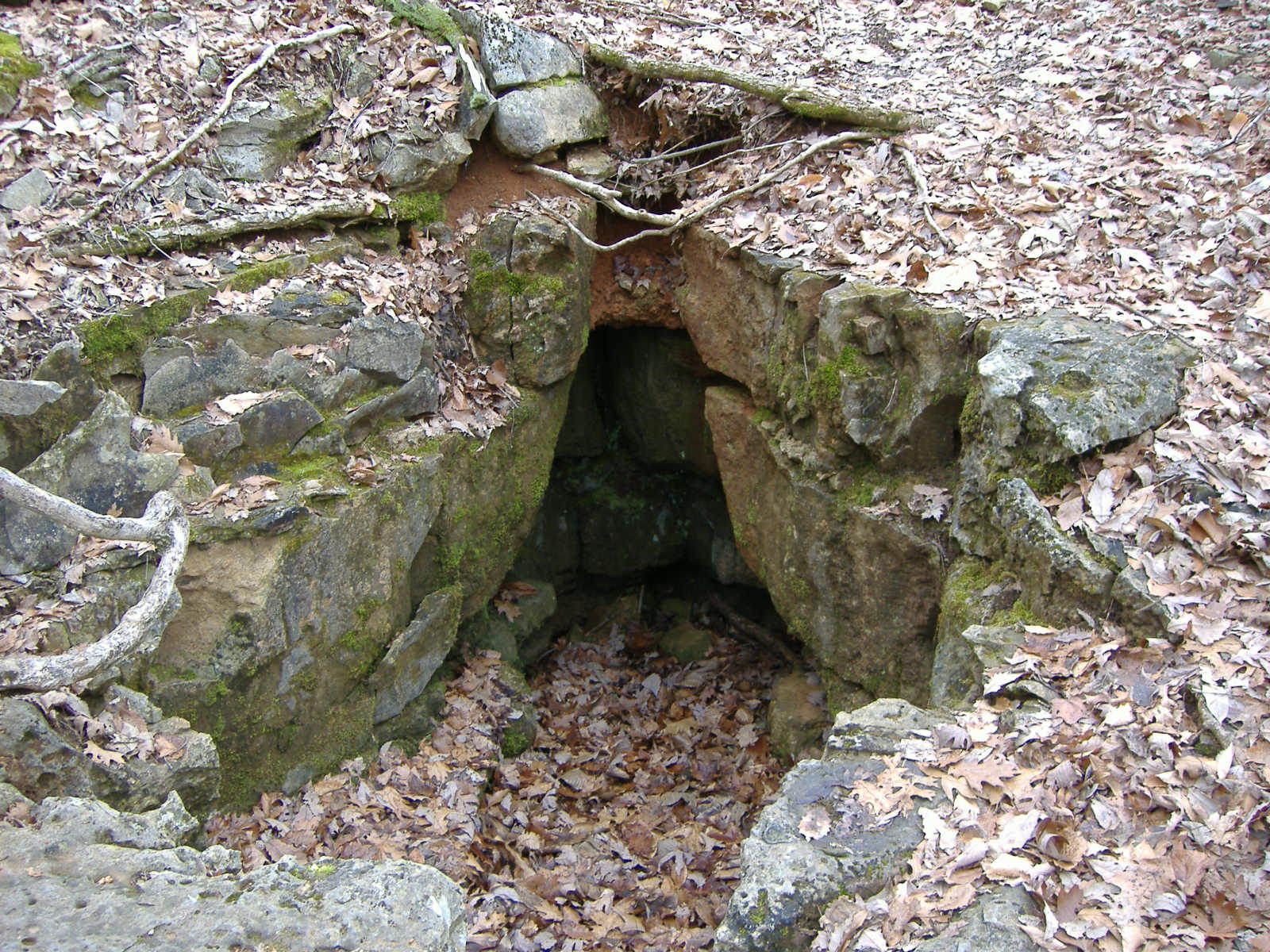
Closeup view of Boone's original burial spot.

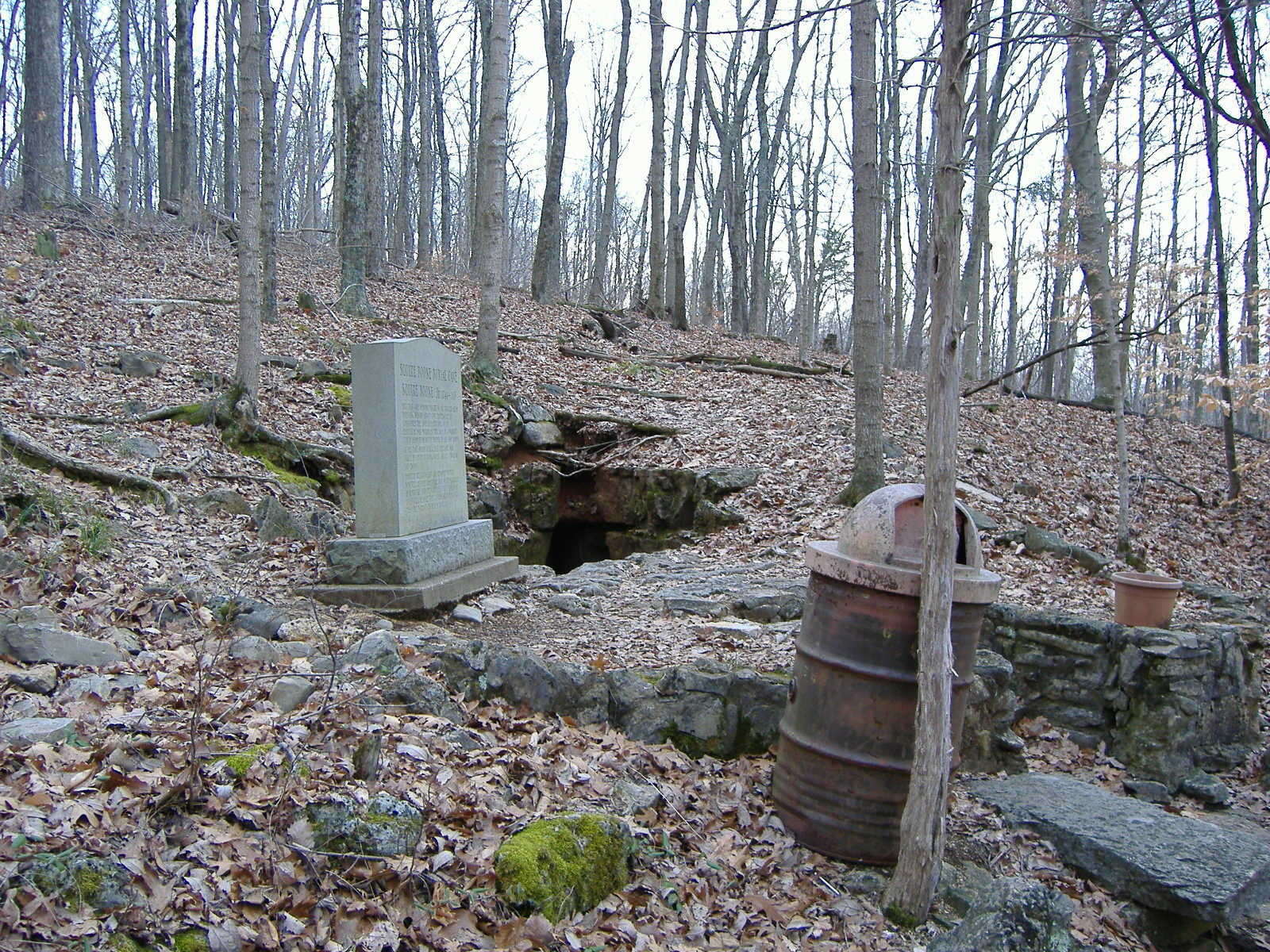
Distant view of location of Boone's original burial cave.

== See also ==
- List of attractions and events in the Louisville metropolitan area
