= Squire Boone =

American frontiersman (1744–1815)

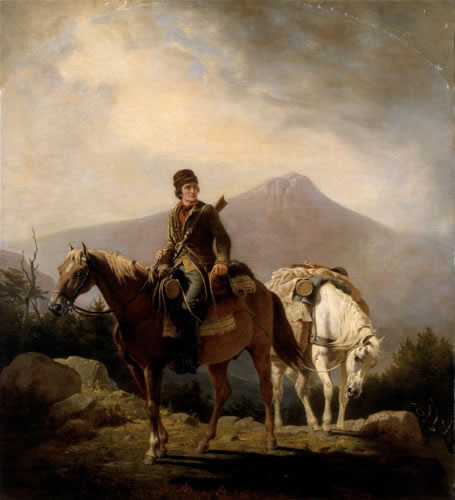
- An 1852 painting titled, "Squire Boone Crossing the Mountains with Stores for His Brother Daniel, Encamped in the Wilds of Kentucky"
- Born: Squire Maugridge Boone Jr. October 5, 1744; Daniel Boone Homestead, Oley Valley, Berks County, Pennsylvania Colony
- Died: August 5, 1815 (aged 70); Mauckport, Indiana
- Resting place: Squire Boone Caverns, Mauckport, Indiana
- Other name: Squire Boone Jr.
- Occupations: Frontiersman, longhunter, soldier, city planner, politician, land locator, politician, gunsmith
- Known for: Colonizing and establishing the first American settlement in Shelby County, Kentucky; Being the brother of Daniel Boone
- Spouse: Jane Van Cleave
- Children: 5
- Relatives: Daniel Boone (brother); Nathan Boone (nephew); Daniel Morgan Boone (nephew); Squire Boone Sr. (father)

Squire Maugridge Boone Jr. (October 5, 1744 – August 5, 1815) was an American frontiersman and the younger brother of Daniel Boone. In 1780, he founded the first colonized settlement in Shelby County, Kentucky. The tenth of eleven children, Squire Boone was born to Squire Boone Sr. and his wife Sarah (Morgan) Boone in Berks County, Pennsylvania, at the Daniel Boone Homestead. Although overshadowed by his famous brother, Squire Boone was well known in his day.

== Early life ==
Squire Boone Jr. was born in Berks County, Pennsylvania, on October 5, 1744, the son of Squire Boone Sr. and Sarah Jarman Morgan. His father was a native of Devon, England. In 1749, he along with his family moved to Rowan County, North Carolina, and lived in the Yadkin Valley. In 1759, aged 15, he was sent back to Pennsylvania to apprentice as a gunsmith under his cousin Samuel Boone. After four and a half years of apprenticeship, he returned to North Carolina. On August 8, 1765, he married Jane Van Cleave, who was of Dutch heritage. Together, the couple had five children.

== Life in Kentucky ==
From 1767 to 1771, Boone went on several long hunts, with his brother, Daniel, into the Kentucky wilderness. In 1775, Richard Henderson, a prominent judge from North Carolina, hired Daniel Boone to blaze what became known as the Wilderness Road, which went through the Cumberland Gap and into central Kentucky. Squire Boone accompanied his brother and 30 others, assisting in the settlement of Boone's Station (present-day Boonesborough).

In Spring 1779, after the siege of Boonesborough, where Squire had a rifle ball cut out of his shoulder, he moved his family to the settlement at the Falls of the Ohio that would become Louisville. In 1780, he brought 13 families to "Painted Stone", a tract of land in Shelby County, and established Squire Boone's Station there, the first permanent settlement in the county. He was wounded in April 1781 when Indians attacked the fort; complications of the gunshot injury would result in his right arm being an inch and a half shorter than his left.

On September 13, 1781, the settlers abandoned the undermanned station and headed for nearby Linn's Station. Since Squire Boone was still too weak from his injury to make the trip, he stayed behind at the station with his family and one other. The fleeing settlers were attacked in what became known as the Long Run Massacre.

In 1782, he began acting as a land locator for wealthy land speculators who did not want to personally risk living on the frontier. However, due to financial losses in this line of work, he lost his own property, including the station, in 1786 and was forced to settle elsewhere in the county. He served two terms in the Virginia legislature in 1789 and 1790 and was the primary sponsor of a bill to charter the town of Louisville.

== Life in Indiana ==
After attempting to establish a settlement near present-day Vicksburg, Mississippi, and staying with his brother Daniel in Missouri for several years, he eventually settled with his family in Harrison County, Indiana, south of Corydon c. 1804. There, he settled with his four sons and the sons of Samuel Boone. The settlement is in what is now called Boone Township, and it began to flourish early on. Squire Boone personally acquired a large tract of land on the western edge of the township near the cave he and his brother had hid in many years earlier to evade Native Americans. Boone considered the cave to be sacred and decided that was where he wanted to be entombed.

On his land, Boone carved stone out of a nearby hill to build his home. He carved into the quarry wall various religious and political statements that are still there today. Boone would also build Old Goshen Church, one of the first churches in the state. Boone also became a close friend of Harvey Heth and involved in the local politics of the area as one of the leading citizens. He was Harrison County's Justice of the peace in 1808.

== Death ==
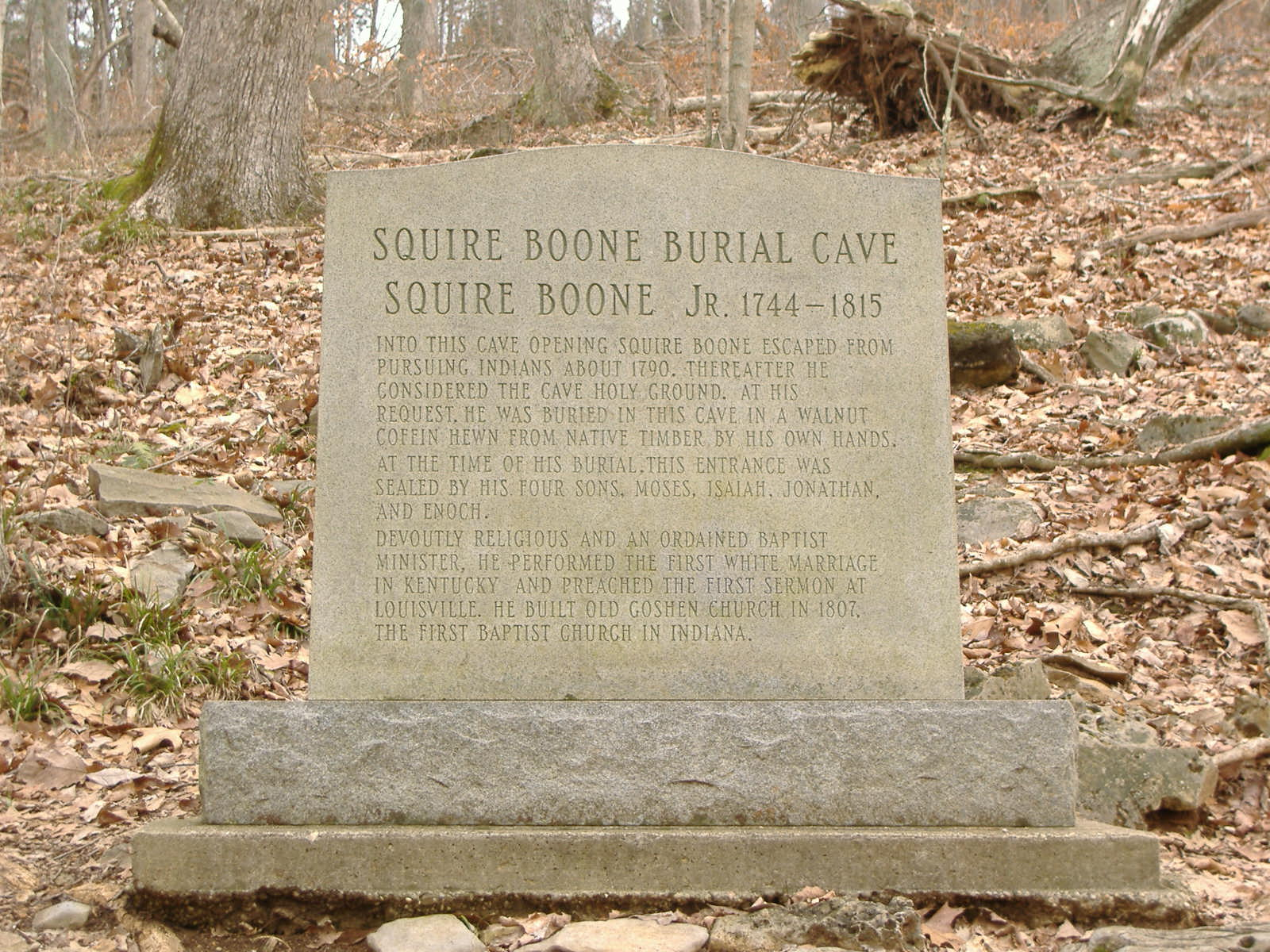
Marker denoting Squire Boone's original burial spot

Squire Boone died of congestive heart failure, at age 70, on August 5, 1815, and was buried per his request in the cave on his property in Harrison County, Indiana (see above). The cave was sealed by his sons and his remains were left undisturbed for many years; but in the mid-20th century, relic hunters began taking parts of his coffin and even some of his bones. The cave eventually was brought under local guardianship and became a commercial attraction (Squire Boone Caverns) with guided tours. In 1973, his remains were removed from the cave and placed into a new coffin built by employees of the cave and reburied in a recessed part of the cave, where it resides today, at the end of the tour of Squire Boone Caverns.
