= Capture and rescue of Jemima Boone =

Incident in the colonial history of Kentucky

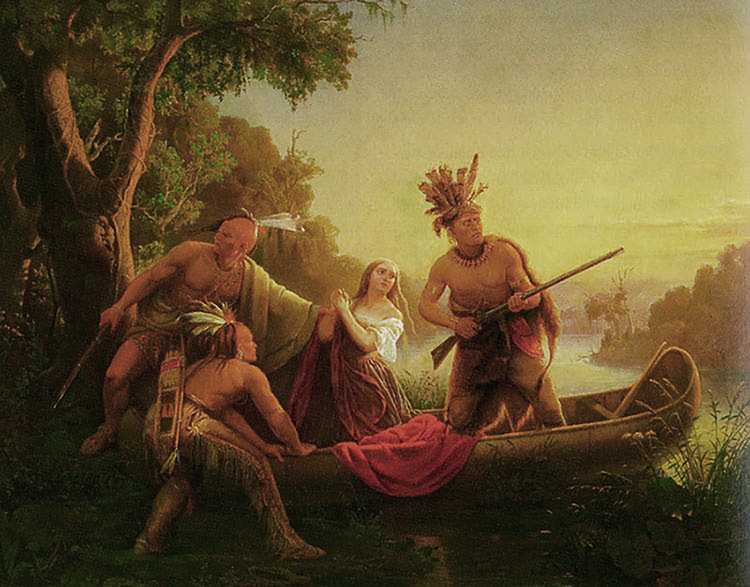
The Abduction of Daniel Boone's Daughter by the Indians by Charles Wimar (1853)

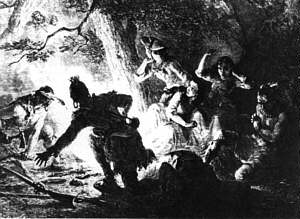
The rescue of Jemima Boone and Betsey and Fanny Callaway, kidnapped by Indians in July 1776

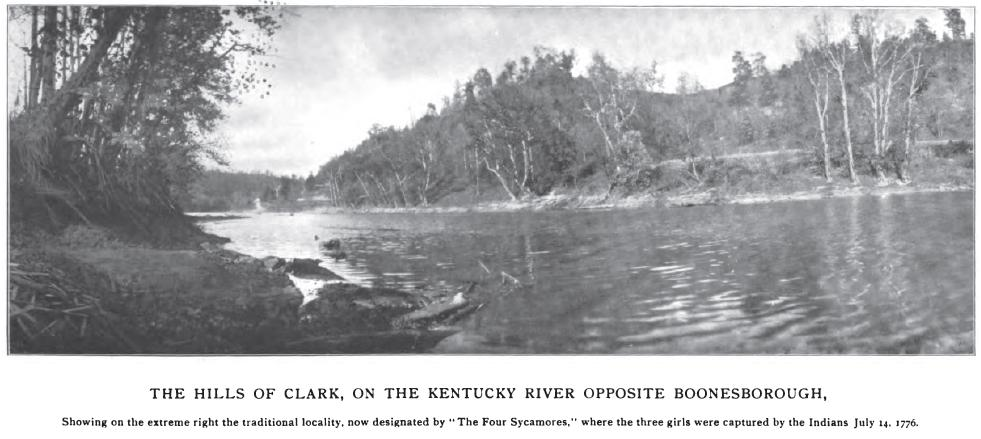
A photograph of the traditional site, designated by the four sycamores on the right shore, of the capture of Jemima Boone and the Callaway girls

The capture and rescue of Jemima Boone and the Callaway girls is a famous incident in the colonial history of Kentucky. Three girls were captured by a Cherokee-Shawnee raiding party on July 14, 1776, and rescued three days later by Daniel Boone and his party, celebrated for their success. The incident was portrayed in 19th-century literature and paintings: James Fenimore Cooper created a fictionalized version of the episode in his novel The Last of the Mohicans (1826) and Charles Ferdinand Wimar painted The Abduction of Boone's Daughter by the Indians (c. 1855).

== History ==
After the outbreak of the American Revolutionary War in 1775, violence increased between Native Americans and settlers in Kentucky. Native Americans, particularly Shawnee from north of the Ohio River, raided the Kentucky settlements, hoping to drive away the settlers, whom they regarded as trespassers. The Cherokee, led by Dragging Canoe, frequently attacked isolated settlers and hunters, convincing many to abandon Kentucky. This was part of a 20-year Cherokee resistance to pioneer settlement. By the late spring of 1776, fewer than 200 Americans remained in Kentucky, primarily at the fortified settlements of Boonesborough, Harrodsburg, and Logan's Station in the southeastern part of the state.

On July 14, 1776, a raiding party caught three teenage girls from Boonesborough as they were floating in a canoe on the Kentucky River. They were Jemima, daughter of Daniel Boone, and Elizabeth and Frances, daughters of Colonel Richard Callaway. The Cherokee Hanging Maw led the raiders, two Cherokee and three Shawnee warriors. The girls' capture raised alarm and Boone organized a rescue party. Meanwhile, the captors hurried the girls north toward the Shawnee towns across the Ohio River. The girls attempted to mark their trail until they were discovered doing so.

The third morning, as the Indians were building a fire for breakfast, the rescuers came up. As one captor was shot, Jemima said, "That's daddy's!" (gun). He was not immediately killed. Two of the wounded Native men later died. The captors retreated, leaving the girls to be taken home by the settlers.

Jemima married Flanders Callaway, who had been one of the rescuing party. Elizabeth Callaway married Samuel Henderson, and Frances married John Holder. The episode served to put the settlers in the Kentucky wilderness on guard and prevented their straying beyond the fort. Although the rescuers had feared the girls would be raped or otherwise abused, Jemima Boone said, "The Indians were kind to us, as much so as they well could have been, or their circumstances permitted."

== Representation in media ==
- The incident is notable for inspiring the chase scene in James Fenimore Cooper's The Last of the Mohicans (1826), in which Lieutenant-Colonel George Munro, the book's protagonist Hawkeye (Natty Bumppo), his adopted Mohican older brother Chingachgook, Chingachgook's son Uncas, and David Gamut follow and overtake the Huron party of Magua who had taken as captives the sisters Cora and Alice Munro.
- The incident was also portrayed in 19th-century historical paintings for its dramatic clash of two cultures. Charles Ferdinand Wimar painted The Abduction of Boone's Daughter by the Indians (c. 1855).
- The rescue was featured as an illustration in William A. Crafts, Pioneers in the Settlement of America (1877).
