= Hemp in Kentucky =

Production and legality of hemp in the US state

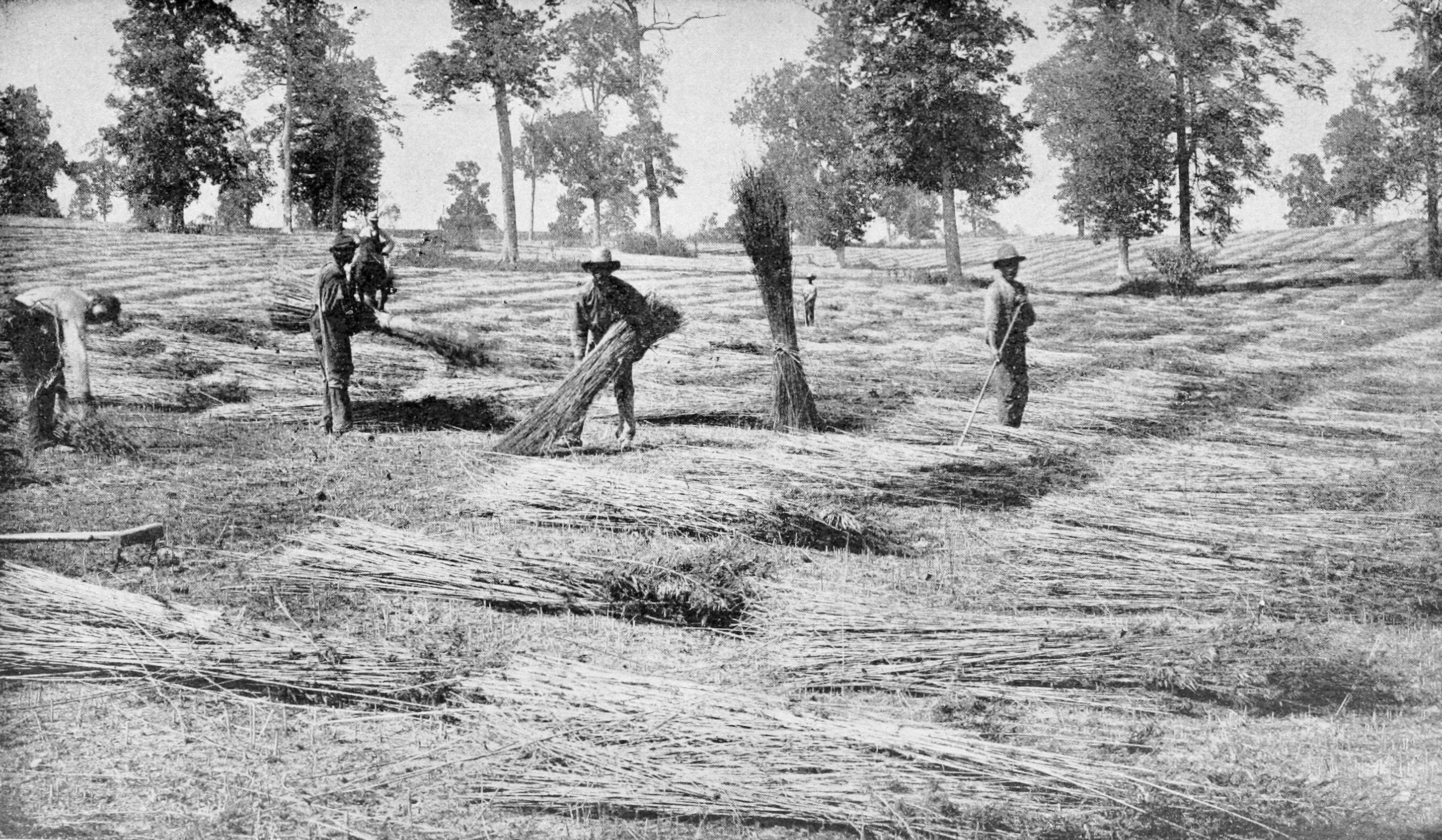
Kentucky hemp harvest, 1895

Kentucky was the greatest producer of hemp in the United States during the 19th and 20th centuries, when it was the source of three fourths of U.S. hemp fiber. Production started to decline after World War I due to the rise of tobacco as the cash crop in Kentucky and the foreign competition of hemp fibers and finished products. In 1970, federal policies virtually banned the production of industrial hemp during the war on drugs saying all Cannabis sativa is a Schedule I controlled substance. Federal law under the Agricultural Act of 2014 allowed research back into hemp. Kentucky began production again with 33 acres in 2014. As of the 2016 harvest season, only two U.S. states other than Kentucky had over 100 acres (40 ha) in hemp production: Colorado and Tennessee. The first 500-acre commercial crop was planted in Harrison County in 2017, and research permits were issued for over 12,000 acres (4,900 ha) that year. The 2016 documentary Harvesting Liberty concerns the 21st century Kentucky hemp industry.

== History ==
=== Early cultivation ===
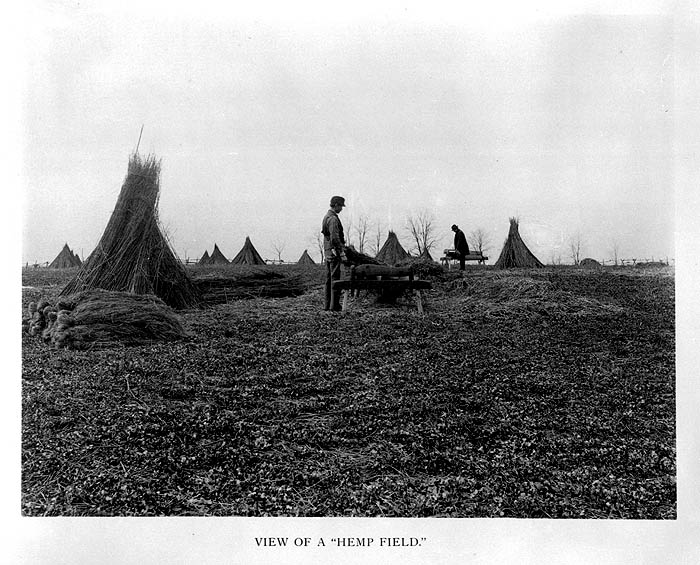
19th century Kentucky hemp field

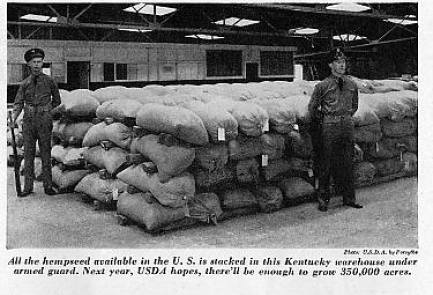
Soldiers in a Kentucky warehouse guarding seed for the 1943 hemp crop

In the 18th century, John Filson wrote in Kentucke and the Adventures of Col. Daniel Boone (an appendix of his 1784 work The Discovery, Settlement and Present State of Kentucke) of the quality of Kentucky's land and climate for hemp production. The first hemp crop in Kentucky was raised near Danville in 1775.

Kentucky was the greatest producer of U.S. hemp in the 19th and 20th centuries, with thousands of acres of hemp in production. (Note: "From the end of the Civil War until 1912, virtually all hemp in the US was produced in Kentucky.") Senator Henry Clay was a "hemp pioneer" and the "strongest advocate" of Kentucky hemp. He grew it on his Kentucky estate Ashland and brought new seeds to the state from Asia. Clay's oratory on the Senate floor in 1810 in favor of requiring the Navy to use domestic hemp exclusively for ship's rigging was widely reprinted in newspapers and is credited for beginning the elaboration of the American System. According to a 1902 periodical, Kentucky was responsible for three quarters of U.S. hemp fiber production. Shelby County was one of the main producing counties of hemp. Supposedly Hempridge Road received its name from Senator Henry Clay. It is said that local residents presented Clay with a walking stick fashioned from a hemp stalk. Clay was so delighted that he reportedly declared any community producing such a hempstalk should be “known as Hempridge.” Production reached a peak in 1917 at 18,000 acres, mostly grown in the Bluegrass region, then waned due to market forces after World War I as other sources of fiber were introduced. A Federal program to reintroduce hemp for wartime needs in Kentucky and other states during World War II reached 52,000 acres in Kentucky in 1943. The WWII effort is documented in the U.S. Department of Agriculture film Hemp for Victory .

=== Decline and criminalization ===
Production of hemp had seen a decline after World War I due to market forces including the rise of tobacco as the cash crop of choice in Kentucky and foreign sources of hemp fiber and finished products. The availability of cheap synthetic fiber after World War II even further discouraged farmers from growing it.

Federal policies, tightened by the Controlled Substances Act of 1970, virtually banned the production of industrial hemp during the war on drugs. According to an industry group, "the 1970 Act abolished the taxation approach [of the 1937 Marijuana Tax Act] and effectively made all cannabis cultivation illegal". The Drug Enforcement Administration (DEA) refused to issue permits for legal hemp cultivation (Note: A legal scholar wrote in 1999, "By law, industrial hemp is classified as a Schedule I controlled substance because of its distant relationship to the much higher tetrahydrocannabinol (THC)-containing plant, marijuana. Anyone wishing to grow, cultivate, or manufacture a Schedule I controlled substance must obtain licensing permission from the D.E.A. ... [I]ndustrial hemp cannot be legally grown in the United States because the D.E.A. refuses to grant farmers and entrepreneurs the required permit, Number 225, which would allow the licensee to "manufacture" a "controlled substance." The D.E.A. has never granted these permits.") and held that, since industrial hemp is from the same species plant as prohibited cannabis (despite its being of lower THC yield), both were prohibited under the Controlled Substances Act. In the words of a 2015 PBS NewsHour segment on hemp, "[t]o the federal government, hemp is just as illegal as marijuana", and according to Newsweek, "all cannabis sativa—whether grown to ease chronic pain, get stoned or make rope—is a schedule I controlled substance".

During this criminalized period, the Cornbread Mafia began its illegal cultivation of marijuana by cross-breeding imported cannabis seeds with native hemp plants left behind after the "Hemp For Victory" period in World War II.

=== Partial re-legalization ===
By the late 20th century, consumer demand for hemp products was resurgent but American farmers were left as bystanders. Imported agricultural products were allowed from other countries, including Canada, but growing hemp legally was not possible in the United States. (Note: According to Purdue researchers in 2002, "In the US, a substantial trade in hemp products has developed, based on imports of hemp fiber, grain, and oil. The American agricultural community has observed this, and has had success at the state level in persuading legislators of the advisability of experimental hemp cultivation as a means of evaluating the wisdom of re-establishing American hemp production.") In 1994, Kentucky was one of the first states to consider reintroducing hemp cultivation, with a commission convened by governor Brereton Jones to investigate legal pathways to do so. In 2013, Kentucky passed a state law, Senate Bill 50, allowing production for agricultural research purposes. Although the Industrial Hemp Farming Act of 2013, which would have allowed hemp production, failed, agricultural hemp was allowed by federal law under the Agricultural Act of 2014 (farm bill). 33 acres in 2014, 922 acres in 2015, 2,350 in 2016, 12,800 acres in 2017, and 6,700 acres in 2018. As of 2016 harvest season, only two U.S. states other than Kentucky had over 100 acres (40 ha) in hemp production: Colorado and Tennessee.

The Industrial Hemp Research Program was conducted under the auspices of the Kentucky Department of Agriculture. Research at the University of Kentucky's Spindletop Research Farm sought to improved agronomy and includes research on optimizing cannabinoid yield. The first research crops at Spindletop and Murray State University were planted in May 2014, with seed obtained from California and, after a legal battle with the DEA, imported from Italy. The researchers are also engineering new mechanical harvesters that can reach the 10–12-foot (3.0–3.7 m) high flowers of tall-growing hemp. The first 500-acre commercial crop was planted in Harrison County in 2017, and research permits were issued for over 12,000 acres (4,900 ha) that year.

== Legal status ==
Under federal law, the THC present in both cannabis and hemp remains a Schedule I controlled substance. Under state law, all hemp grown in compliance with the 2014 farm bill must have a delta-9 THC content not more than 0.3%. Farmers participating in the program must use seeds provided by an educational institution with a DEA license and use varieties expected to be low in THC. A sample of each farmer's hemp crop is tested by the state.

Under the 2018 United States farm bill, commodity hemp production was federally legalized.

== Production ==
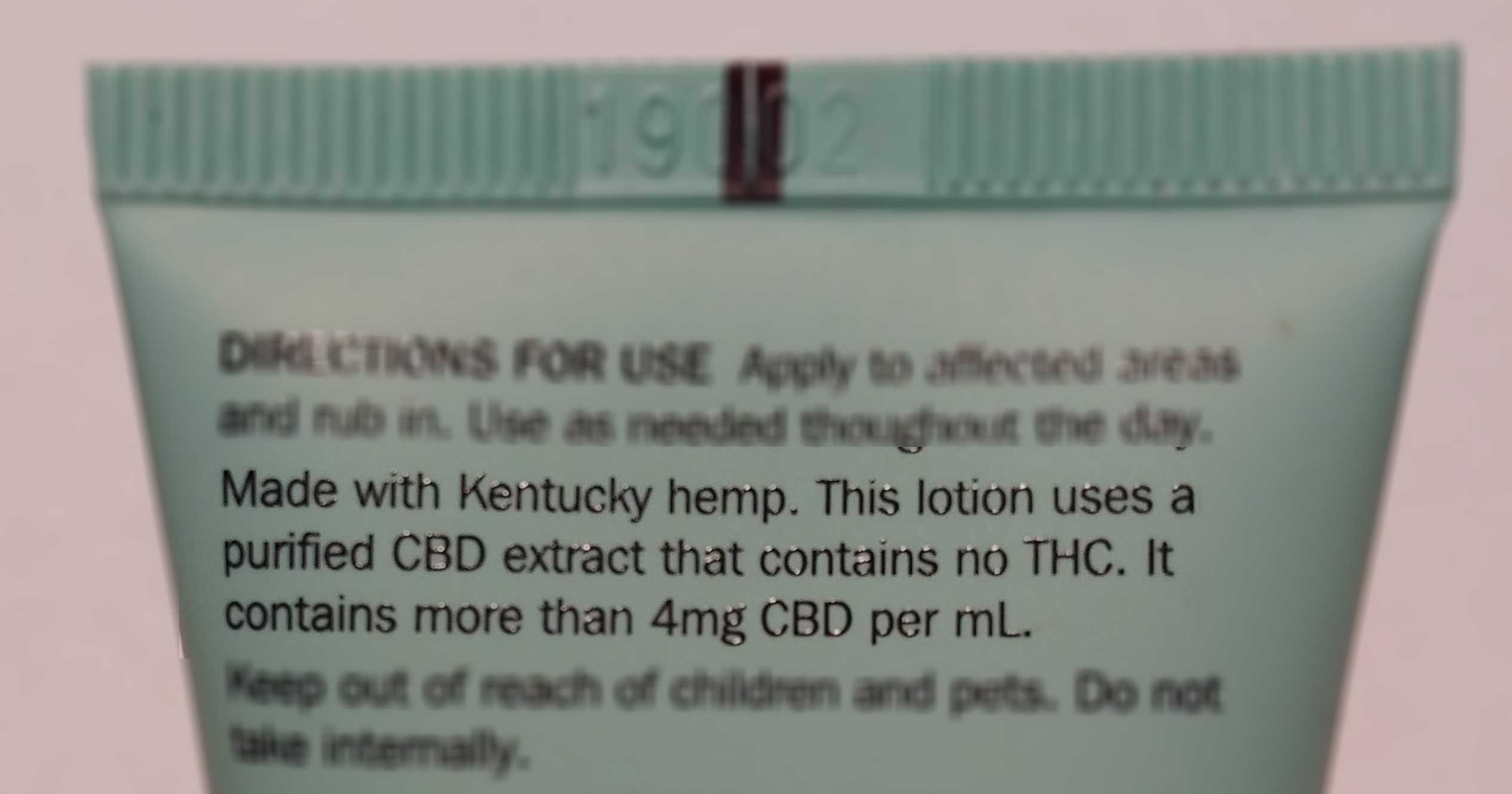
Cosmetic product made from Kentucky hemp

Businesses exist in Kentucky which provide agricultural products based on hemp or supporting hemp production. Cynthiana-based Ananda Hemp has been operating in the Commonwealth since 2014.

=== Oil extraction ===
Testing of a $400,000 oil extraction facility in Winchester began in March 2016, with full production capacity of 20,000 lb (9,100 kg) per hour expected by the end of the year. GenCanna and Atalo Holdings are hopeful of turning their property at Winchester into a "Hemp Research Campus".

=== Seed production ===
Three varieties of hemp seed from Lexington seed company Schiavi Seeds were the first to be certified by Colorado Department of Agriculture. Certified in late 2016 for the 2017 Colorado crop, the varieties were originally from Italy and Serbia.

== Documentaries and Books ==
Documentary films concerning Kentucky hemp have included Hemp for Victory (U.S. Department of Agriculture, 1942) and Harvesting Liberty (Mike Lewis, 2016), which shows farmers in rural Kentucky considering hemp farming for food, fuel and fiber.

The nonfiction book, The Cornbread Mafia by James Higdon has 14 references to Kentucky hemp.

== See also ==
- Agriculture in Kentucky
- History of Kentucky
