= Boone's Cave Park =

County park in North Carolina, United States

Coordinates: 35.797°N 80.465°W

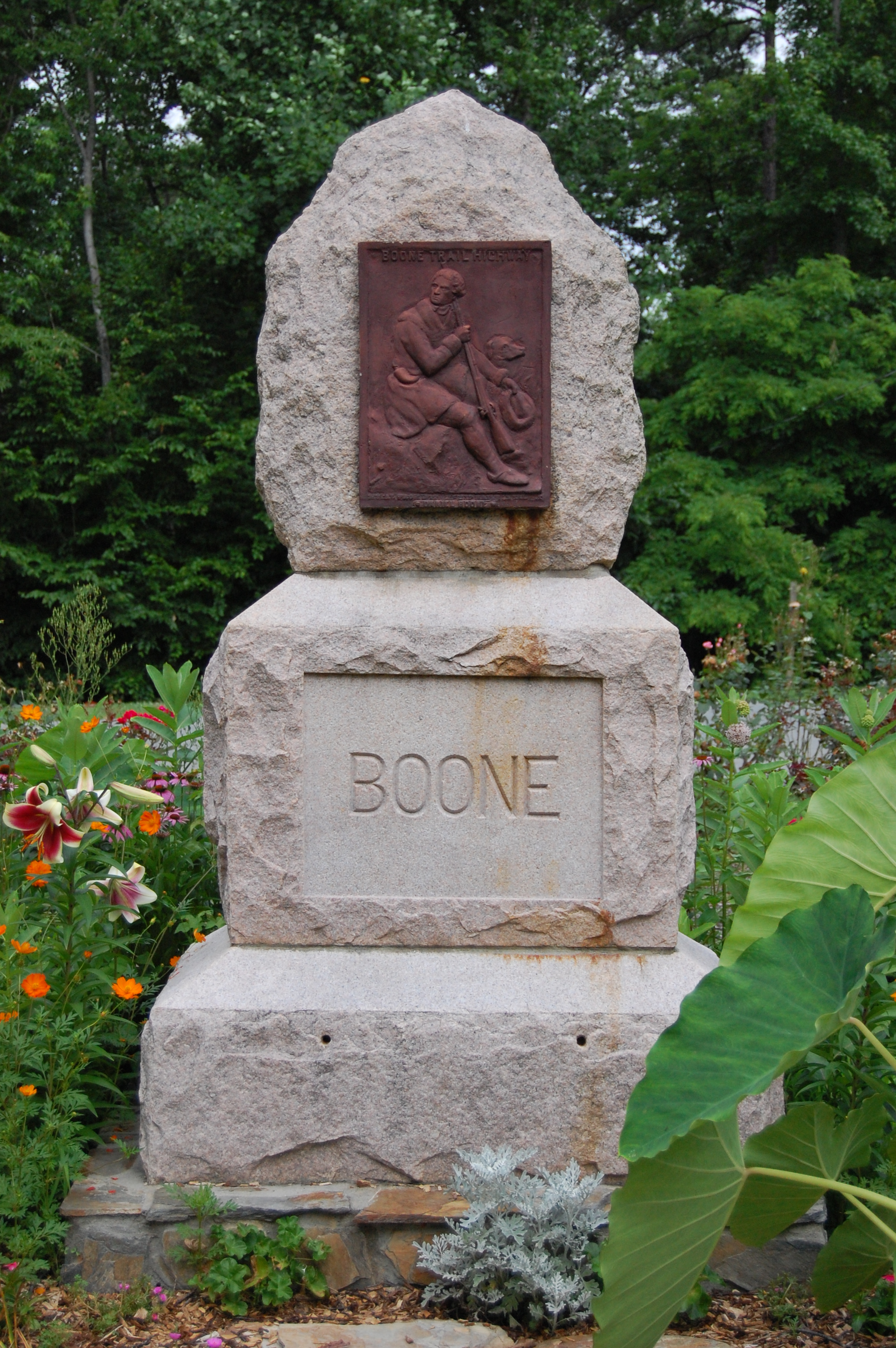
Monument near entry of park marking it as part of the Boone Trail

Boone's Cave Park is a 110-acre county park located near Lexington, North Carolina It was established in 1909 by the Daniel Boone Memorial Association. It is named after American pioneer Daniel Boone.

== History ==
There are a number of places named "Boone's Cave," but the cave in the park is rumored to be the one where Squire and Sarah Jarman Morgan spent their first winter, with the then teenage Daniel upon entering the region in 1751, perhaps to escape Native Americans. There was a total of 25 people in the group, with all 10 of the Boones children, and other family members and neighbors who all left Pennsylvania together. The Boone family and everyone else soon built homes near the cave, located next to the Yadkin River.

The Boones eventually settled on the opposite banks of the Yadkin River, which serves as a county line and into what is now Davie County, about two miles (three km) west of Mocksville.

== Geography ==
The park is approximately 120 acres and supports a variety of flora and fauna native to the area, including a number of hardwoods such as oak, hornbeam and elm. Over 50 different flowering plants such as laurel and wild hydrangea can be found in the park.

The cave itself is 140 foot long, and most sections require crawling to gain access. It is within sight of the Yadkin River and part of the 165-mile Yadkin River Trail.

== Gallery ==
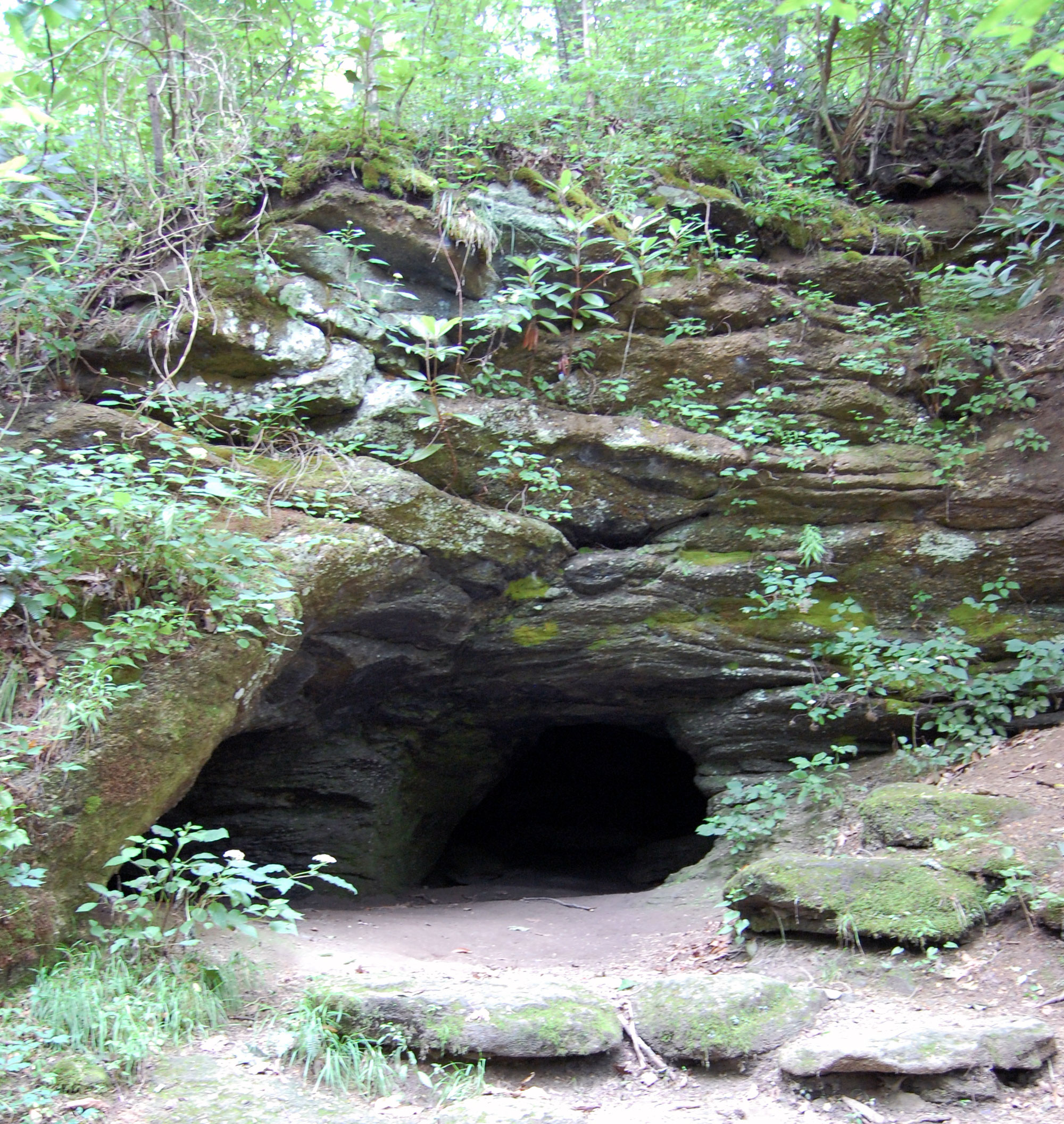
Entry of cave

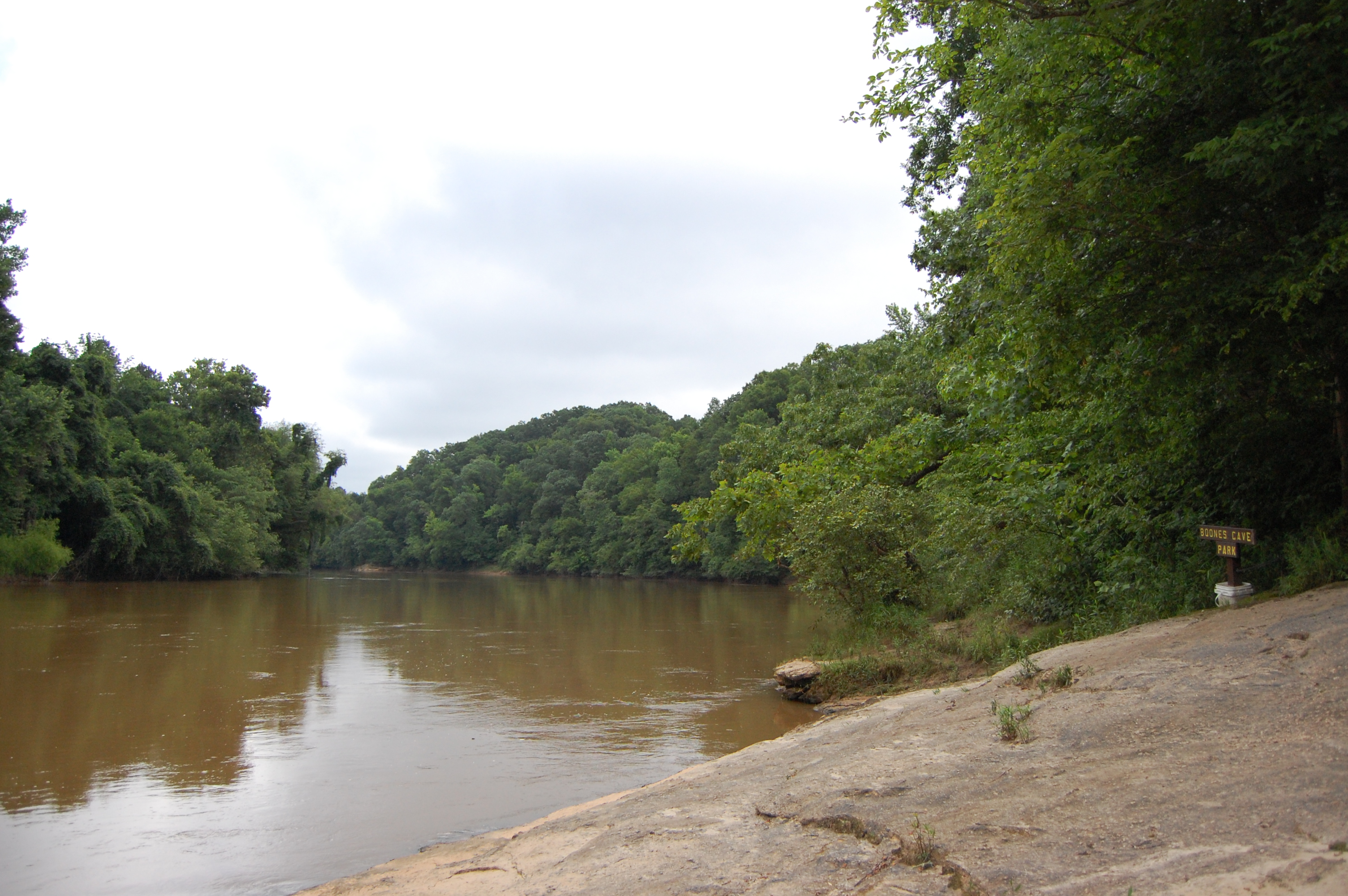
"Baptism Rock" at the Yadkin River, between the cave and the original homesite

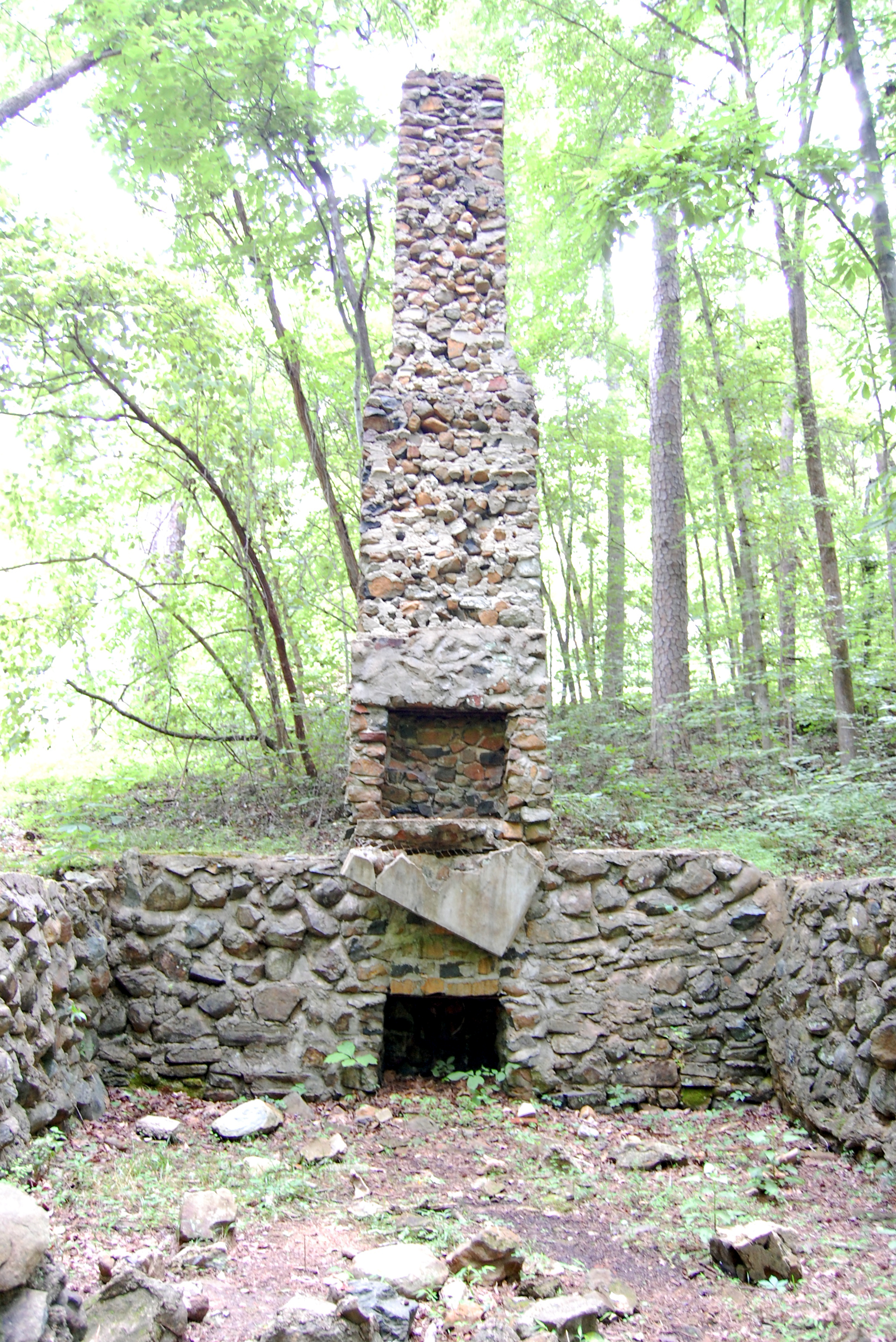
Remains of Park Ranger's cabin built by the CCC in the 1930s

== See also ==
- Boone Trail
