= Daniel Boone =

American pioneer and frontiersman (1734–1820)

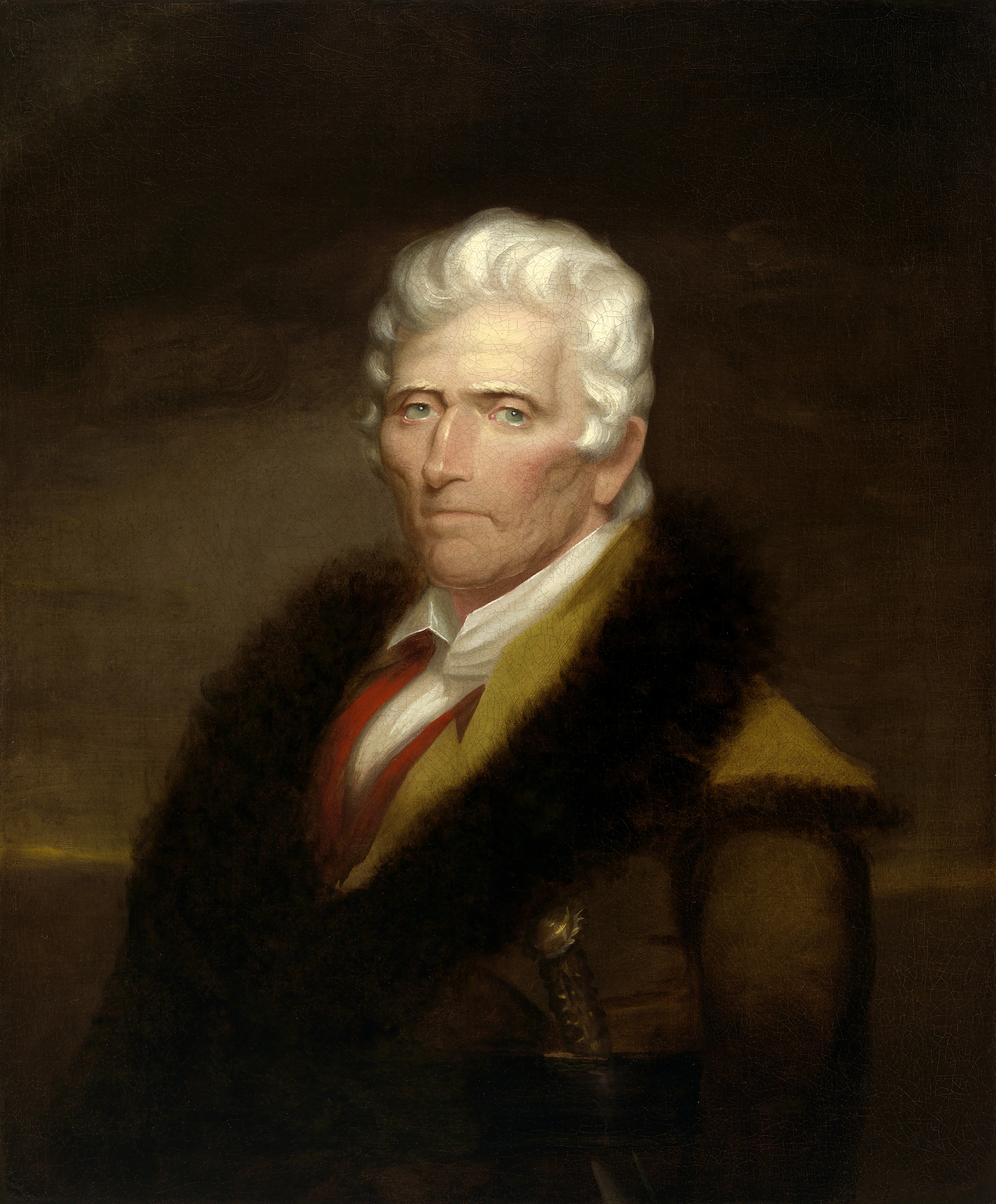
- 1820 portrait (Note: By Chester Harding, this is the only known portrait of Boone made during his lifetime.)

Member of the Virginia House of Delegates
- In office October 1791 – December 1791
- Constituency: Kanawha County
- In office October 1787 – December 1787
- Constituency: Bourbon County
- In office October 1781 – December 1781
- Constituency: Fayette County

Personal details
- Born: November 2, 1734 Oley Valley, Pennsylvania, British America
- Died: September 26, 1820 (aged 85) Defiance, Missouri, U.S.
- Resting place: Frankfort Cemetery, Frankfort, Kentucky, or Old Bryan Farm Cemetery, Marthasville, Missouri
- Spouse: Rebecca Bryan (m. 1756; died 1813)
- Children: 10, including Jemima, Daniel, and Nathan
- Relatives: Squire Boone (brother); Levi Boone (nephew); Alphonso Boone (grandson)
- Occupation: Hunter; soldier; politician; surveyor; merchant

Daniel Boone (2 November [O.S. 22 October] 1734 – September 26, 1820) was an American pioneer and frontiersman whose adventures made him one of the first folk heroes of the United States. He became famous for his exploration and settlement of Kentucky, which was then beyond the western borders of the Thirteen Colonies. In 1775, under commission from Judge Richard Henderson's Transylvania Company, Boone blazed the Wilderness Road through the Cumberland Gap and into Kentucky in the face of resistance from nearby Native American tribes. He founded Boonesborough, one of the first English-speaking settlements west of the Appalachian Mountains. By the end of the 18th century, more than 200,000 people had entered Kentucky by following the route marked by Boone.

He served as a militia officer during the Revolutionary War (1775–1783), which in Kentucky was fought primarily between American settlers and British-allied Indians. In 1778, Boone was captured by the Shawnee and was, according to legend, adopted by the Shawnee Chief and given the name "Sheltowee", or Big Turtle. After months of living with the Shawnee, Boone escaped. He was elected to the first of his three terms in the Virginia General Assembly during the war and fought in the Battle of Blue Licks in 1782, one of the last battles of the American Revolution. He worked as a surveyor and merchant after the war, but went deep into debt as a Kentucky land speculator. He resettled in Missouri in 1799, where he spent most of the last two decades of his life, frustrated with legal problems resulting from his land claims.

Boone remains a legendary, if imperfectly remembered, figure in American history. He was celebrated in his own lifetime, especially after an account of his adventures was published in 1784, making him famous in America and Europe. After his death, he became the subject of many heroic tall tales and works of fiction. His adventures—real and mythical—helped create the archetypal frontier hero of American folklore. In American popular culture, Boone is remembered as one of the foremost early frontiersmen, even though mythology often overshadows the historical details of his life.

== Early life ==
Boone was born on October 22, 1734 ("New Style" November 2), the sixth of eleven children in a family of Quakers. (Note: The Gregorian calendar was adopted during Boone's lifetime, which moved his birth date from October 22 to November 2; Boone always used the October date.) His father, Squire Boone, immigrated to colonial Pennsylvania from the small town of Bradninch in the county of Devon, England, sometime around 1712. Squire, a weaver and blacksmith, married Sarah Morgan, whose family were Quakers from Wales. In 1731, the Boones built a one-room log cabin in the Oley Valley in what is now Berks County, Pennsylvania, near present-day Reading, where Daniel was born.

Boone spent his early years on the Pennsylvania frontier, often interacting with Native Americans. Boone learned to hunt from local settlers and Native Americans; by the age of fifteen, he had a reputation as one of the region's best hunters. Many stories about Boone emphasize his hunting skills. In one tale, the young Boone was hunting in the woods with some other boys when the howl of a panther scattered all but Boone. He calmly cocked his rifle and shot the panther through the heart just as it leaped at him. The story may be a folktale, one of many that became part of Boone's popular image.

In Boone's youth, his family became a source of controversy in the local Quaker community. In 1742, Boone's parents were compelled to publicly apologize after their eldest child Sarah married a "worldling", or non-Quaker, while she was visibly pregnant. When Boone's oldest brother Israel also married a "worldling" in 1747, Squire Boone stood by his son and was therefore expelled from the Quakers, although his wife continued to attend monthly meetings with her children. Perhaps as a result of this controversy, in 1750 Squire sold his land and moved the family to North Carolina. Daniel Boone did not attend church again, although he always considered himself a Christian and had all of his children baptized. The Boones eventually settled on the Yadkin River, in what is now Davie County, North Carolina, about two miles (3 km) west of Mocksville.

Boone received little formal education, since he preferred to spend his time hunting, apparently with his parents' blessing. According to a family tradition, when a schoolteacher expressed concern over Boone's education, Boone's father said, "Let the girls do the spelling and Dan will do the shooting." Boone was tutored by family members, though his spelling remained unorthodox. Historian John Mack Faragher cautions that the folk image of Boone as semiliterate is misleading, arguing that Boone "acquired a level of literacy that was the equal of most men of his times." Boone regularly took reading material with him on his hunting expeditions—the Bible and Gulliver's Travels were favorites. He was often the only literate person in groups of frontiersmen, and would sometimes entertain his hunting companions by reading to them around the campfire.

== Hunter, husband, and soldier ==
I can't say as ever I was lost, but I was bewildered once for three days.

— Daniel Boone

The French and Indian War (1754–1763) broke out between the French and the British, along with their respective Indian allies, and Boone joined a North Carolina Provincial company as a teamster and blacksmith. In 1755, his unit accompanied General Edward Braddock's attempt to drive the French out of the Ohio Country, which ended in disaster at the Battle of the Monongahela. Boone, in the rear with the wagons, took no part in the battle, and fled with the retreating soldiers. He returned home after the defeat, and married Rebecca Bryan, a neighbor in the Yadkin Valley, on August 14, 1756. The couple initially lived in a cabin on his father's farm, and eventually had ten children, in addition to raising eight children of deceased relatives.

In 1759, conflict erupted in North Carolina between British colonists and the Cherokees, their former allies in the French and Indian War. When Cherokee warriors raided the Yadkin Valley in retaliation for the murders of dozens of Cherokee by Virginians and South Carolinians, the Boones and many other families took refuge in fortified communities like Bethabara. Boone saw action as a member of the North Carolina militia during the Anglo-Cherokee War. In April 1759, Boone served under Lt Morgan Bryan in a scouting company after their neighbor Daniel Hoosey and others were killed in a raid.

Boone supported his growing family in these years as a market hunter and trapper, collecting pelts for the fur trade. Almost every autumn, despite the unrest on the frontier, he would go on "long hunts", extended expeditions into the wilderness lasting weeks or months. Boone went alone or with a small group of men, accumulating hundreds of deer skins in the autumn, and trapping beaver and otter over the winter. When the long hunters returned in the spring, they sold their take to commercial fur traders. On their journeys, frontiersmen often carved messages on trees or wrote their names on cave walls, and Boone's name or initials have been found in many places. A tree in Washington County, Tennessee reads "D. Boon Cilled a. Bar on tree in the year 1760". A similar carving is preserved in the museum of the Filson Historical Society in Louisville, Kentucky which reads "D. Boon Kilt a Bar, 1803." The inscriptions may be genuine, or part of a long tradition of phony Boone relics.

According to a popular story, Boone returned home after a long absence to find that Rebecca had given birth to a daughter. Rebecca confessed that she had thought that Daniel was dead, and that his brother had fathered the child. Boone did not blame Rebecca, and raised the girl as his own child. Boone's early biographers knew the story but did not publish it. Modern biographers regard the tale as possibly folklore, since the identity of the brother and the daughter vary in different versions of the tale.

In the mid-1760s, Boone began to look for a new place to settle. The population was growing in the Yadkin Valley, which reduced the amount of game available for hunting. He had difficulty making ends meet, and was often taken to court for nonpayment of debts. He sold what land he owned to pay off creditors. After his father's death in 1765, Boone traveled with a group of men to Florida, which had become British territory after the end of the war, to look into the possibility of settling there. According to a family story, he purchased land in Pensacola, but Rebecca refused to move so far away from friends and family. The Boones instead moved to a more remote area of the Yadkin Valley, and he began to hunt westward into the Blue Ridge Mountains.

== Into Kentucky ==
It was the first of May, in the year 1769, that I resigned my domestic happiness for a time, and left my family ... to wander through the wilderness of America, in quest of the country of Kentucky.

— Daniel Boone

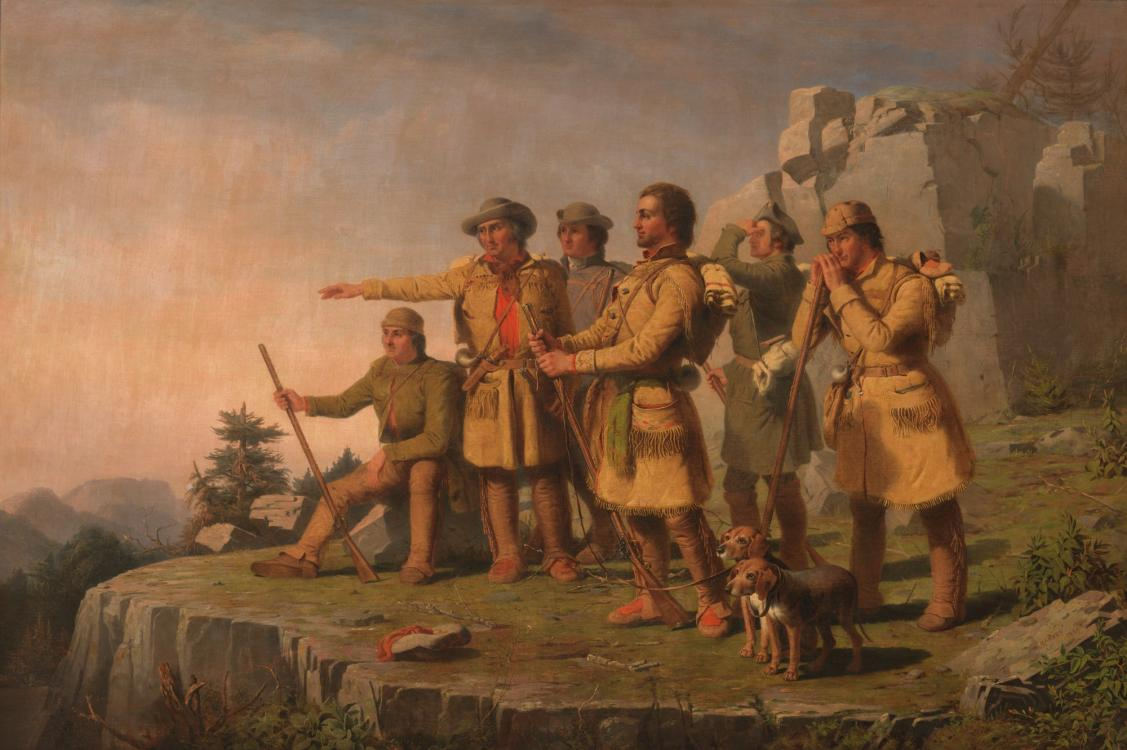
Boone's First View of Kentucky, William Tylee Ranney (1849)

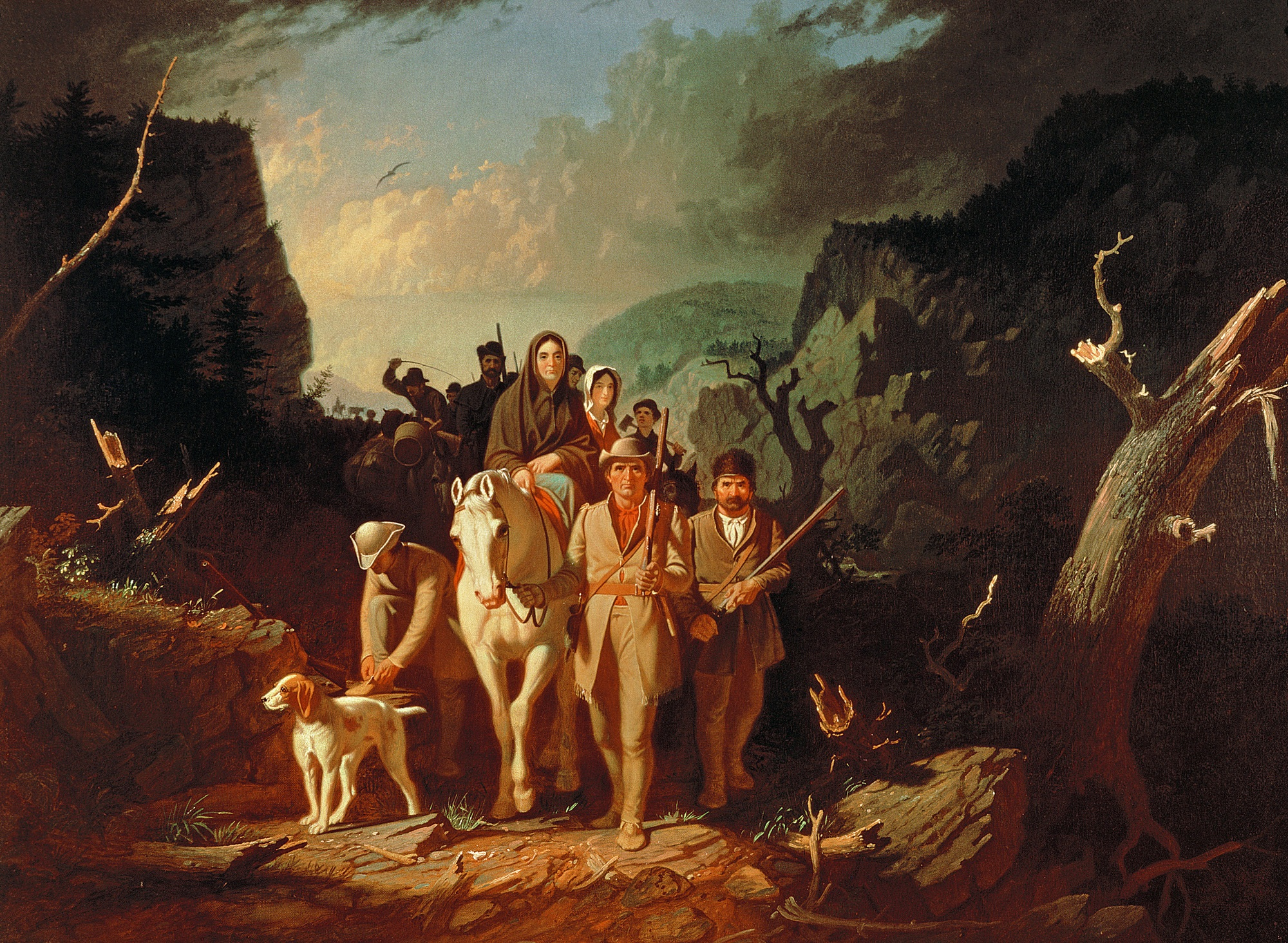
George Caleb Bingham's Daniel Boone Escorting Settlers through the Cumberland Gap (1851–52) is a famous depiction of Boone.

Years before entering Kentucky, Boone had heard about the region's fertile land and abundant game. In 1767, Boone and his brother Squire first crossed into what became the state of Kentucky, but they failed to reach the rich hunting grounds. In May 1769, Boone set out again with a party of five others—including John Findley, who first told Boone of the Cumberland Gap—on a two-year hunting and trapping expedition. His first sighting of the Bluegrass region from atop Pilot Knob became "an icon of American history", and was the frequent subject of paintings.

On December 22, 1769, Boone and his brother-in-law and fellow longhunter John Stewart were captured by a party of Shawnee, who confiscated all of their skins and told them to leave and never return. The Shawnee had not signed the 1768 Treaty of Fort Stanwix, in which the Iroquois had ceded their claim to Kentucky to the British. The Shawnee regarded Kentucky as their hunting ground; they considered American hunters there to be poachers. Boone, undeterred, continued hunting and exploring in Kentucky. On one occasion, he shot a man to avoid capture, which historian John Mack Faragher says "was one of the few Indians that Boone acknowledged killing." Boone returned to North Carolina in 1771, but came back to hunt in Kentucky in the autumn 1772.

In 1773, Boone packed up his family and, with his brother Squire and a group of about 50 others, began the first attempt by British colonists to establish a settlement. Boone was still an obscure figure at the time; the most prominent member of the expedition was William Russell, a well-known Virginian and future brother-in-law of Patrick Henry. Another member of this expedition was Boone's friend and fellow long-hunter, Michael Stoner.

Included in this group were an unknown number of enslaved Blacks, including Charles and Adam. On October 9, Boone's oldest son, James, several Whites and Charles and Adam left the main party to seek provisions in a nearby settlement. They were attacked by a band of Delawares, Shawnee, and Cherokees. Following the Fort Stanwix treaty, American Indians in the region had been debating what to do about the influx of settlers. This group had decided, in the words of Faragher, "to send a message of their opposition to settlement". James Boone and William Russell's son, Henry, were tortured and killed. Charles was captured. Adam witnessed the horror concealed in riverbank driftwood. After wandering in the woods for 11 days, Adam located the group and informed Boone of the circumstances of their deaths. Charles's body was found by the pioneers 40 miles from the abduction site, dead from a blow to the head. The brutality of the killings sent shockwaves along the frontier, and Boone's party abandoned their expedition.

The attack was one of the first events in what became known as Dunmore's War, a struggle between Virginia and American Indians for control of what is now West Virginia and Kentucky. In the summer of 1774, Boone traveled with a companion to Kentucky to notify surveyors there of the outbreak of war. They journeyed more than 800 miles (1,300 km) in two months to warn those who had not already fled the region. Upon his return to Virginia, Boone helped defend colonial settlements along the Clinch River, earning a promotion to captain in the militia, as well as acclaim from fellow citizens. After the brief war, which ended soon after Virginia's victory in the Battle of Point Pleasant in October 1774, the Shawnee relinquished their claims to Kentucky.

Following Dunmore's War, Richard Henderson, a prominent judge from North Carolina, hired Boone to help establish a colony to be called Transylvania. (Note: Boone's earlier expeditions into Kentucky might have been financed by Henderson in exchange for information about potential places for settlement, though the record is unclear.) Boone traveled to several Cherokee towns and invited them to a meeting, held at Sycamore Shoals in March 1775, where Henderson purchased the Cherokee claim to Kentucky.

Boone then blazed "Boone's Trace", later known as the Wilderness Road, through the Cumberland Gap and into central Kentucky. Sam, an enslaved Black "body servant", and other enslaved laborers were among this group of settlers. When this group camped near the location of present-day Richmond, Kentucky, Indians attacked, killing Sam and his owner. After driving off the attackers, the party buried the two men side by side.

Boone founded Boonesborough along the Kentucky River; other settlements, notably Harrodsburg, were also established at this time. Despite occasional Indian attacks, Boone brought his family and other settlers to Boonesborough on September 8, 1775.

== American Revolution ==
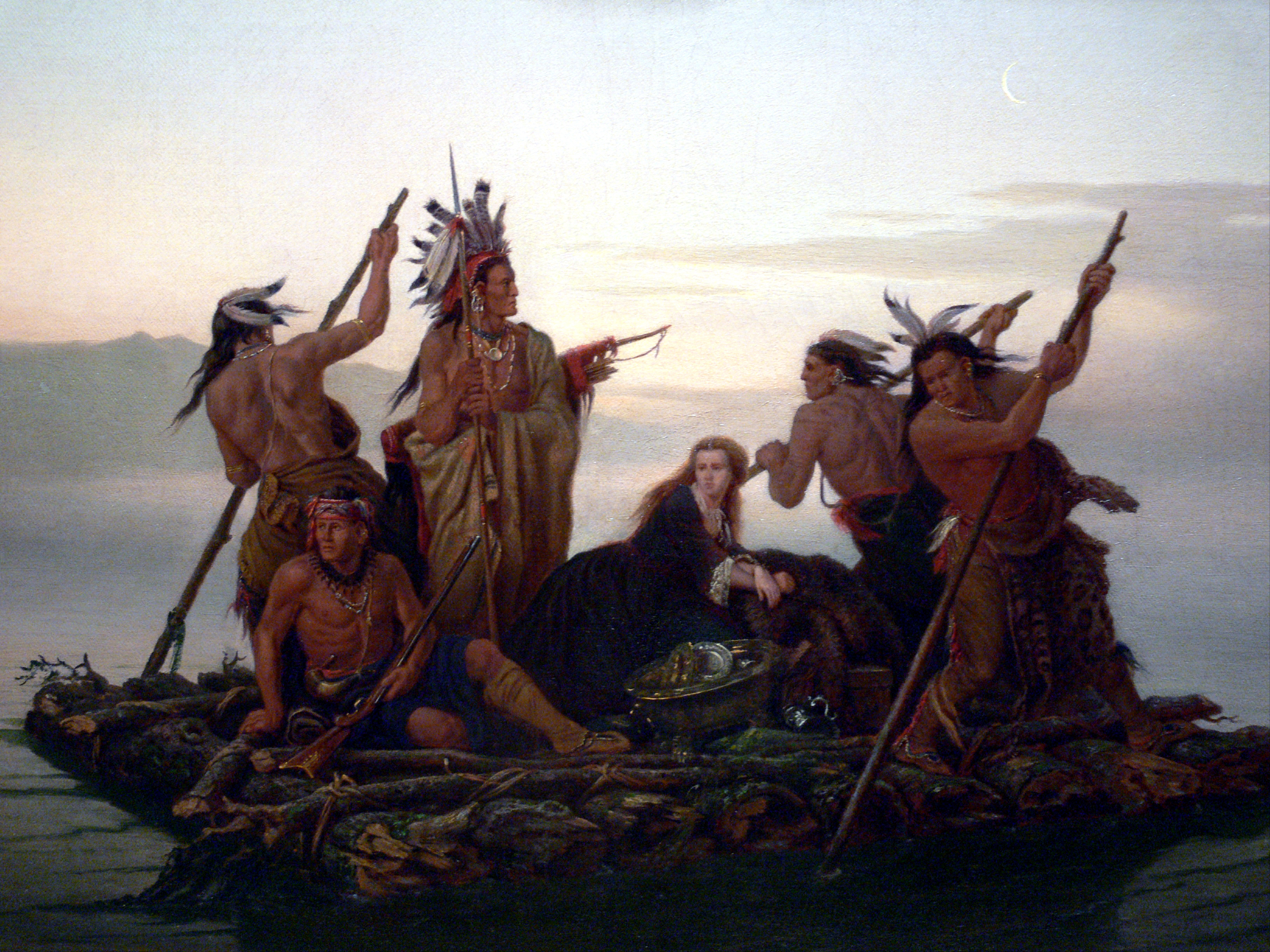
Abduction of Boone's Daughter, painting by Karl Ferdinand Wimar, 1855, Amon Carter Museum of American Art

American Indians who were unhappy about the loss of Kentucky by treaties saw the American Revolutionary War (1775–1783) as a chance to drive out the colonists. Isolated settlers and hunters became the frequent target of attacks, convincing many to abandon Kentucky. By late spring of 1776, Boone and his family were among the fewer than 200 colonists who remained, primarily at the fortified settlements of Boonesborough, Harrodsburg, and Logan's Station.

On July 14, 1776, Boone's daughter Jemima and two other girls were captured outside Boonesborough by an Indian war party, who carried the girls north toward the Shawnee towns in the Ohio country. Boone and a group of men from Boonesborough set out in pursuit, finally catching up with them two days later. Boone and his men ambushed the Indians, rescuing the girls and driving off their captors. The incident became the most celebrated event of Boone's life. James Fenimore Cooper created a version of this episode in his classic novel The Last of the Mohicans (1826).

In 1777, Henry Hamilton, British Lieutenant Governor of Quebec, began to recruit American Indian war parties to raid the Kentucky settlements. That same year in March, the newly formed militia of Kentucky County, Virginia, mustered in Boonesborough, whose population included ten to 15 enslaved people. On April 24, 1778, the British-allied Shawnee led by Chief Blackfish mounted the siege of Boonesborough. Armed enslaved men fought alongside their owners at the fort's walls. After going beyond the fort walls to engage the attackers, London, one of the enslaved, was killed.

Boone was shot in the ankle while outside the fort. Amid a flurry of bullets, he was carried back inside by Simon Kenton, a recent arrival at Boonesborough. Kenton became Boone's close friend, as well as a legendary frontiersman in his own right.

=== Capture and court-martial ===
While Boone recovered, the Shawnee kept up their attacks outside Boonesborough, killing cattle and destroying crops. With food running low, the settlers needed salt to preserve what meat they had, so in January 1778, Boone led a party of 30 men to the salt springs on the Licking River. On February 7, when Boone was hunting for meat for the expedition, he was captured by Blackfish's warriors. Because Boone's party was greatly outnumbered, Boone returned to camp the next day with Blackfish and persuaded his men to surrender rather than put up a fight.

Blackfish intended to move on to Boonesborough and capture it, but Boone argued the women and children would not survive a winter trek as prisoners back to the Shawnee villages. Instead, Boone promised that Boonesborough would surrender willingly the following spring. Boone did not have an opportunity to tell his men that he was bluffing to prevent an immediate attack on Boonesborough. Boone pursued this strategy so convincingly some of his men concluded he had switched sides, an impression that led to his court-martial (see below). Many of the Shawnee wanted to execute the prisoners in retaliation for the recent murder of Shawnee Chief Cornstalk by Virginia militiamen. Because Shawnee chiefs led by seeking consensus, Blackfish held a council. After an impassioned speech by Boone, the warriors voted to spare the prisoners. Although Boone had saved his men, Blackfish pointed out that Boone had not included himself in the agreement, so Boone was forced to run the gauntlet through the warriors, which he survived with minor injuries.

External videos
- Presentation by Robert Morgan on Boone: A Biography, October 15, 2007, C-SPAN

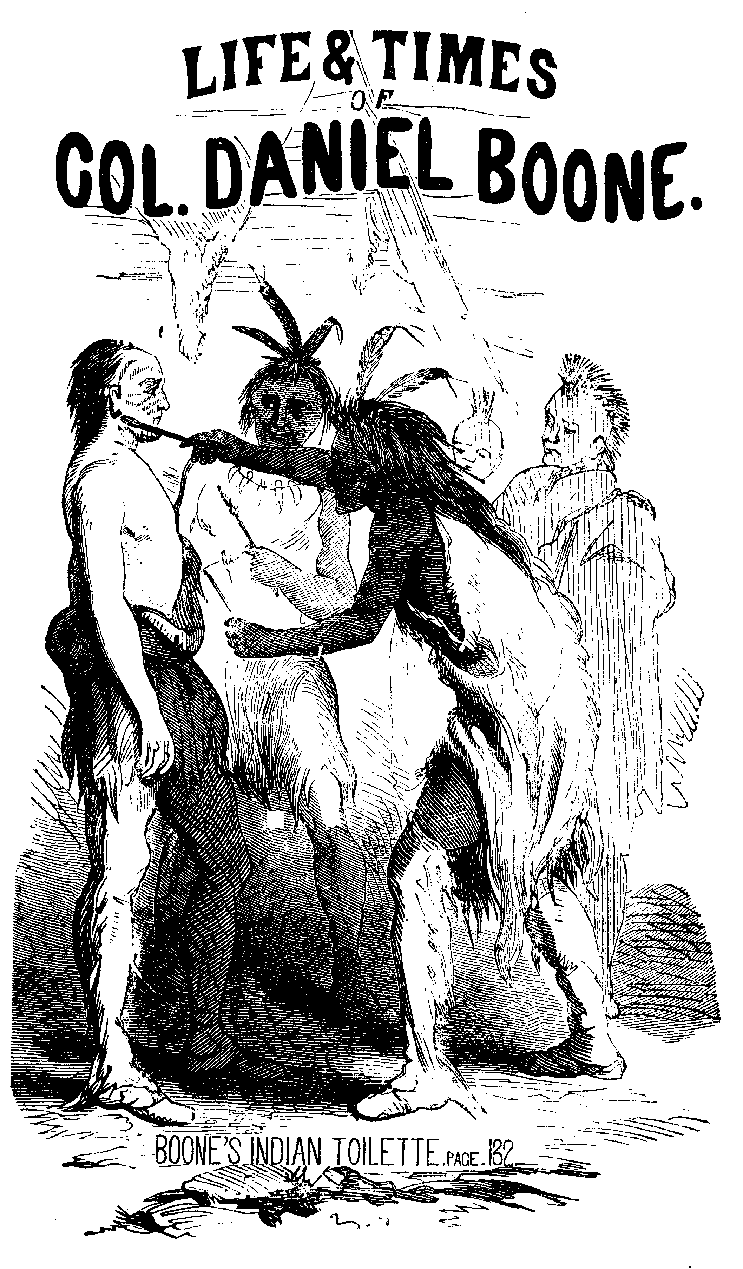
Illustration of Boone's ritual adoption by the Shawnee, from Life & Times of Col. Daniel Boone, by Cecil B. Hartley (1859)

Boone and his men were taken to Blackfish's town of Chillicothe. As was their custom, the Shawnee adopted some of the prisoners to replace fallen warriors. Boone was adopted into a Shawnee family at Chillicothe, perhaps into Blackfish's family, and given the name Sheltowee (Big Turtle). (Note: Biographers usually state that Boone was adopted by Blackfish, but historian John Sugden believes Boone was probably adopted by another family.) In March 1778, the Shawnee took the unadopted prisoners to Governor Hamilton in Detroit. Blackfish brought Boone along, though he refused Hamilton's offers to release Boone to the British. Hamilton gave Boone gifts, attempting to win his loyalty, while Boone continued to pretend that he intended to surrender Boonesborough. Boone returned with Blackfish to Chillicothe. (Note: Glenn Tucker reports that Boone became Tecumseh’s brother by adoption: "Blackfish was as fascinated with Boone as with a new trinket, though Boone had killed the chief’s son in an earlier raid. By the time he reached Detroit Blackfish had determined not to part with Boone at any price. Hamilton gave Boone a horse and trappings, paid Blackfish and the warriors a thousand dollars in provisions for the ten others and soothed Blackfish by allowing him to keep Boone. Boone rode his new horse to Old Chillicothe, which he and the Shawnee reached on April 10. There he and one of the salt-makers who had stayed behind, a youth named Benjamin Kelly, became Tecumseh’s brothers by adoption.")

On June 16, 1778, when he learned Blackfish was about to return to Boonesborough with a large force, Boone eluded his captors and raced home, covering the 160 miles (260 km) to Boonesborough in five days on horseback and, after his horse gave out, the majority on foot. Biographer Robert Morgan calls Boone's escape and return "one of the great legends of frontier history."

Upon Boone's return to Boonesborough, some of the men expressed doubts about Boone's loyalty, since he had apparently lived happily among the Shawnee for months. Boone responded by leading a preemptive raid against the Shawnee across the Ohio River, and then by helping to successfully defend Boonesborough against a 10-day siege led by Blackfish, which began on September 7, 1778. After the siege, Captain Benjamin Logan and Colonel Richard Callaway—both of whom had nephews who were still captives surrendered by Boone—brought charges against Boone for his recent activities. In the court-martial that followed, Boone was found "not guilty" and was even promoted after the court heard his testimony. Despite this vindication, Boone was humiliated by the court-martial, and he rarely spoke of it.

=== Final years of the Revolution ===
After the trial, Boone returned to North Carolina to take his family back to Kentucky. In the fall of 1779, a large party of emigrants came with him, including the family of Captain Abraham Lincoln, grandfather of the future president. Rather than remain in Boonesborough, Boone founded the nearby settlement of Boone's Station, Kentucky. He began earning money by locating good land for other settlers. Transylvania land claims had been invalidated after Virginia created Kentucky County, so settlers needed to file new land claims with Virginia. In 1780, Boone collected about $20,000 in cash (equivalent to $350,000 in 2025) from various settlers and traveled to Williamsburg to purchase their land warrants. While he was sleeping in a tavern during the trip, the cash was stolen from his room. Some of the settlers forgave Boone the loss; others insisted he repay the stolen money, which took him several years to do.

In contrast to the later folk image of Boone as a backwoodsman who had little affinity for "civilized" society, Boone was a leading citizen of Kentucky at this time. When Kentucky was divided into three Virginia counties in November 1780, Boone was promoted to lieutenant colonel in the Fayette County militia. In April 1781, he was elected as a representative to the Virginia General Assembly, which was held in Richmond. In 1782, he was elected sheriff of Fayette County.

Meanwhile, the American Revolutionary War continued. Boone joined General George Rogers Clark's invasion of the Ohio country in 1780, fighting in the Battle of Piqua against the Shawnee on August 7. On the way home from the campaign, Boone was hunting with his brother Ned when Shawnee shot and killed Ned, who resembled Daniel. The Shawnee beheaded Ned, believing him to be Daniel, and took the head as evidence that Daniel Boone had finally been slain. (Note: Morgan says Ned Boone was probably just scalped, not beheaded.)

In 1781, Boone traveled to Richmond to take his seat in the legislature, but British dragoons under Banastre Tarleton captured Boone and several other legislators near Charlottesville. The British released Boone on parole several days later. During Boone's term, Cornwallis surrendered at Yorktown in October 1781, but the fighting continued in Kentucky. Boone returned to Kentucky and in August 1782 fought in the Battle of Blue Licks, a disastrous defeat for the Kentuckians in which Boone's son Israel was killed. In November 1782, Boone took part in another Clark-led expedition into Ohio, the last major campaign of the war.

== Businessman and politician ==
After the Revolutionary War ended, Boone resettled in Limestone (later renamed Maysville, Kentucky), then a booming Ohio River port. He kept a tavern and worked as a surveyor, horse trader, and land speculator. In 1784, on Boone's 50th birthday, frontier historian John Filson published The Discovery, Settlement and Present State of Kentucke. The popular book included a chronicle of Boone's adventures, which made Boone a celebrity.

As settlers poured into Kentucky, the border war with American Indians north of the Ohio River resumed. In September 1786, Boone took part in a military expedition into the Ohio Country led by Benjamin Logan. Returning to Limestone, Boone housed and fed Shawnee who had been captured during the raid, and helped to negotiate a truce and prisoner exchange. Although the war would not end until the American victory at the Battle of Fallen Timbers eight years later, the 1786 expedition was the last time Boone saw military action. (Note: Most biographers tell a story of Boone allowing his friend Blue Jacket, a Shawnee chief, to escape while in Boone's custody in Limestone. According to the scholarly biography of Blue Jacket, the chief escaped at a later time.)

Boone was initially prosperous in Limestone, owning seven slaves, a relatively large number for Kentucky at the time. In 1786, he purchased a Pennsylvania enslaved woman, age of about 20, for "Ninety poundes Current Lawfull (sic) money." A leader, he served as militia colonel, sheriff, and county coroner. In 1787, he was again elected to the Virginia state assembly, this time from Bourbon County. He began to have financial troubles after engaging in land speculation, buying and selling claims to tens of thousands of acres. These ventures ultimately failed because of the chaotic nature of land speculation in frontier Kentucky and Boone's poor business instincts. Frustrated with the legal hassles that went with land speculation, in 1789 Boone moved upriver to Point Pleasant, Virginia (now West Virginia). There he operated a trading post and occasionally worked as a surveyor's assistant. That same year, when Virginia created Kanawha County, Boone became the lieutenant colonel of the county militia. In 1791, he was elected to the Virginia legislature for the third time. He contracted to provide supplies for the Kanawha militia, but his debts prevented him from buying goods on credit, so he closed his store and returned to hunting and trapping, though he was often hampered by rheumatism.

In 1795, Boone and his wife moved back to Kentucky, living in the Daniel Boone Cabin on land owned by their son Daniel Morgan Boone in what became Nicholas County. The next year, Boone applied to Isaac Shelby, the first governor of the new state of Kentucky, for a contract to widen the Wilderness Road into a wagon route, but the contract was awarded to someone else. Meanwhile, lawsuits over conflicting land claims continued to make their way through the Kentucky courts. Boone's remaining land claims were sold off to pay legal fees and taxes, but he no longer paid attention to the process. In 1798, a warrant was issued for Boone's arrest after he ignored a summons to testify in a court case, although the sheriff never found him. That same year, the Kentucky assembly named Boone County in his honor.

== Into Missouri ==
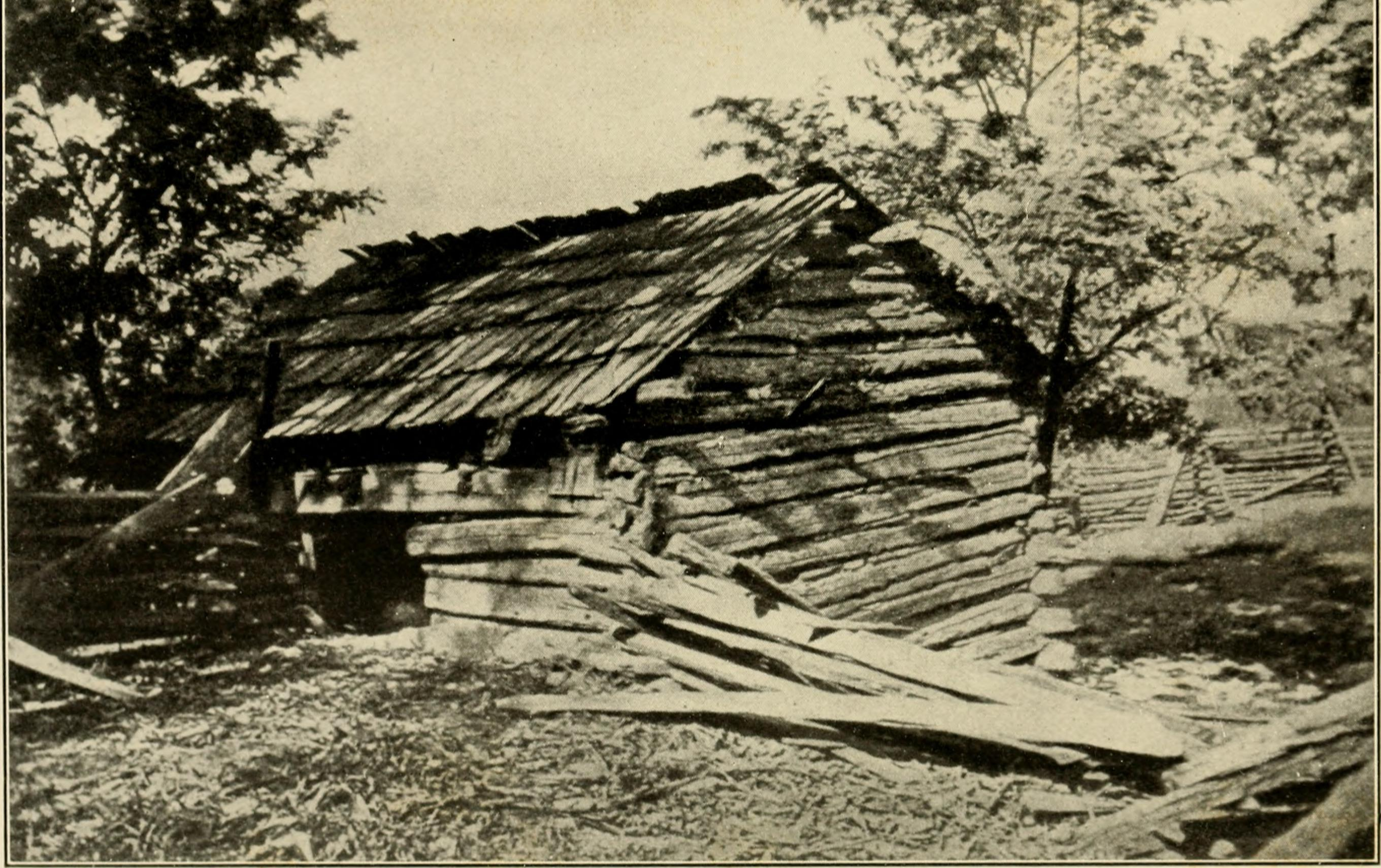
Boone's cabin in Missouri

Having endured legal and financial setbacks, Boone sought to make a fresh start by leaving the United States. In 1799, he moved his extended family to what is now St. Charles County, Missouri, then part of Spanish Louisiana. The Spanish, eager to promote settlement in the sparsely populated region, did not enforce the official requirement that all immigrants be Catholic. The Spanish governor appointed Boone "syndic" (judge and jury) and commandant (military leader) of the Femme Osage district. Anecdotes of Boone's tenure as syndic suggest he sought to render fair judgments rather than strictly observe the letter of the law.

Boone served as syndic and commandant until 1804, when Missouri became part of the United States following the Louisiana Purchase. He was appointed captain of the local militia. Because Boone's land grants from the Spanish government had been largely based on oral agreements, he again lost his land claims. In 1809, he petitioned Congress to restore his Spanish land claims, which was finally done in 1814. Boone sold most of this land to repay old Kentucky debts. When the War of 1812 came to Missouri, Boone's sons Daniel Morgan Boone and Nathan Boone took part, but by that time Boone was much too old for militia duty.

Although Boone reportedly vowed never to return to Kentucky after moving to Missouri, stories (possibly folk tales) were told of him making one last visit to Kentucky to pay off his creditors. American painter John James Audubon claimed to have gone hunting with Boone in Kentucky around 1810. Years later, Audubon painted a portrait of Boone, supposedly from memory, although skeptics noted the similarity of his painting to the well-known portraits by Chester Harding. Some historians believe Boone visited his brother Squire near Kentucky in 1810 and have accepted the veracity of Audubon's account. (Note: Morgan surmises that Audubon probably met Boone in Missouri but claimed the encounter had been in Kentucky because of Boone's famed connection to that state.)

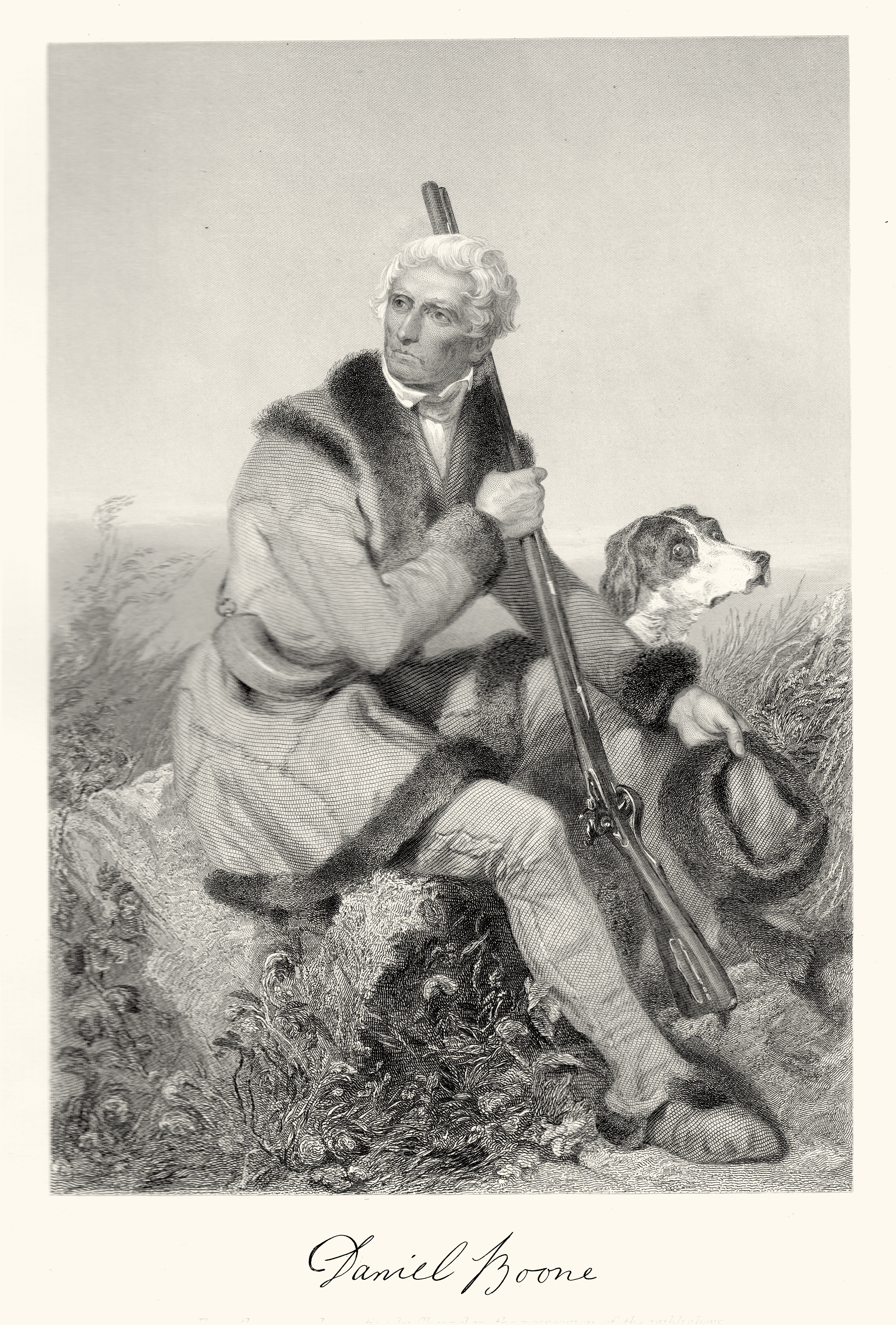
This engraving by Alonzo Chappel (c. 1861) depicts an elderly Boone hunting in Missouri.

Boone spent his final years in Missouri, often in the company of children and grandchildren. He continued to hunt and trap as much as his health and energy levels permitted, intruding upon the territory of the Osage tribe, who once captured him and confiscated his furs. In 1810, at the age of 76, he went with a group on a six-month hunt up the Missouri River, reportedly as far as the Yellowstone River, a round trip of more than 2,000 miles. He began one of his final trapping expeditions in 1815, in the company of a Shawnee and Derry Coburn, a slave who was frequently with Boone in his final years. They reached Fort Osage in 1816, where an officer wrote, "We have been honored by a visit from Col. Boone... He has taken part in all the wars of America, from Braddock's war to the present hour," but "he prefers the woods, where you see him in the dress of the roughest, poorest hunter."

== Death and burial ==
Boone died on September 26, 1820, at his son Nathan Boone's home on Femme Osage Creek, Missouri. He was buried next to Rebecca, who had died on March 18, 1813. The graves, which were unmarked until the mid-1830s, were near Jemima (Boone) Callaway's home on Tuque Creek, about two miles (3 km) from present-day Marthasville, Missouri.

In 1845, the Boones' remains were disinterred and reburied in a new cemetery in Frankfort, Kentucky. Resentment in Missouri about the disinterment grew over the years, and a legend arose that Boone's remains never left Missouri. According to this story, Boone's tombstone in Missouri had been inadvertently placed over the wrong grave, but no one had corrected the error—and that Boone's Missouri relatives, displeased with the Kentuckians who came to exhume Boone, kept quiet about the mistake and allowed the Kentuckians to dig up the wrong remains. No contemporary evidence indicates this actually happened, but in 1983, a forensic anthropologist examined a crude plaster cast of Boone's skull made before the Kentucky reburial and announced it might be the skull of an African American. Black slaves were also buried at Tuque Creek, so it is possible that the wrong remains were mistakenly removed from the crowded graveyard. Both the Frankfort Cemetery in Kentucky and the Old Bryan Farm graveyard in Missouri claim to have Boone's remains.

== Legacy ==
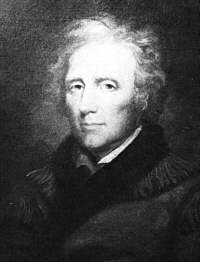
Portrait of Boone, John James Audubon, after 1810

Many heroic actions and chivalrous adventures are related of me which exist only in the regions of fancy. With me the world has taken great liberties, and yet I have been but a common man.

— Daniel Boone

Daniel Boone remains an iconic figure in American history, although his status as an early American folk hero and later as a subject of fiction has tended to obscure the actual details of his life. He emerged as a legend in large part because of John Filson's "The Adventures of Colonel Daniel Boon", part of his book The Discovery, Settlement and present State of Kentucke. First published in 1784, Filson's book was primarily intended to popularize Kentucky to immigrants. It was translated into French and German, and made Boone famous in America and Europe. Based on interviews with Boone, Filson's book contained a mostly factual account of Boone's adventures from the exploration of Kentucky through the American Revolution, although many have doubted if the florid, philosophical dialogue attributed to Boone was authentic. (Note: Unlike most biographers, Morgan argues the dialogue in Filson's book may be a fairly accurate representation of how Boone would have spoken to an educated easterner like Filson.) Often reprinted, Filson's book established Boone as one of the first popular heroes of the United States.

Timothy Flint also interviewed Boone, and his Biographical Memoir of Daniel Boone, the First Settler of Kentucky (1833) became one of the best-selling biographies of the 19th century. Flint embellished Boone's adventures, doing for Boone what Parson Weems did for George Washington. In Flint's book, Boone fought with a bear, escaped from Indians by swinging on vines (as Tarzan would later do), and so on. Although Boone's family thought the book was absurd, Flint greatly influenced the popular conception of Boone, since these tall tales were recycled in countless dime novels and books aimed at young boys.

=== Symbol and stereotype ===
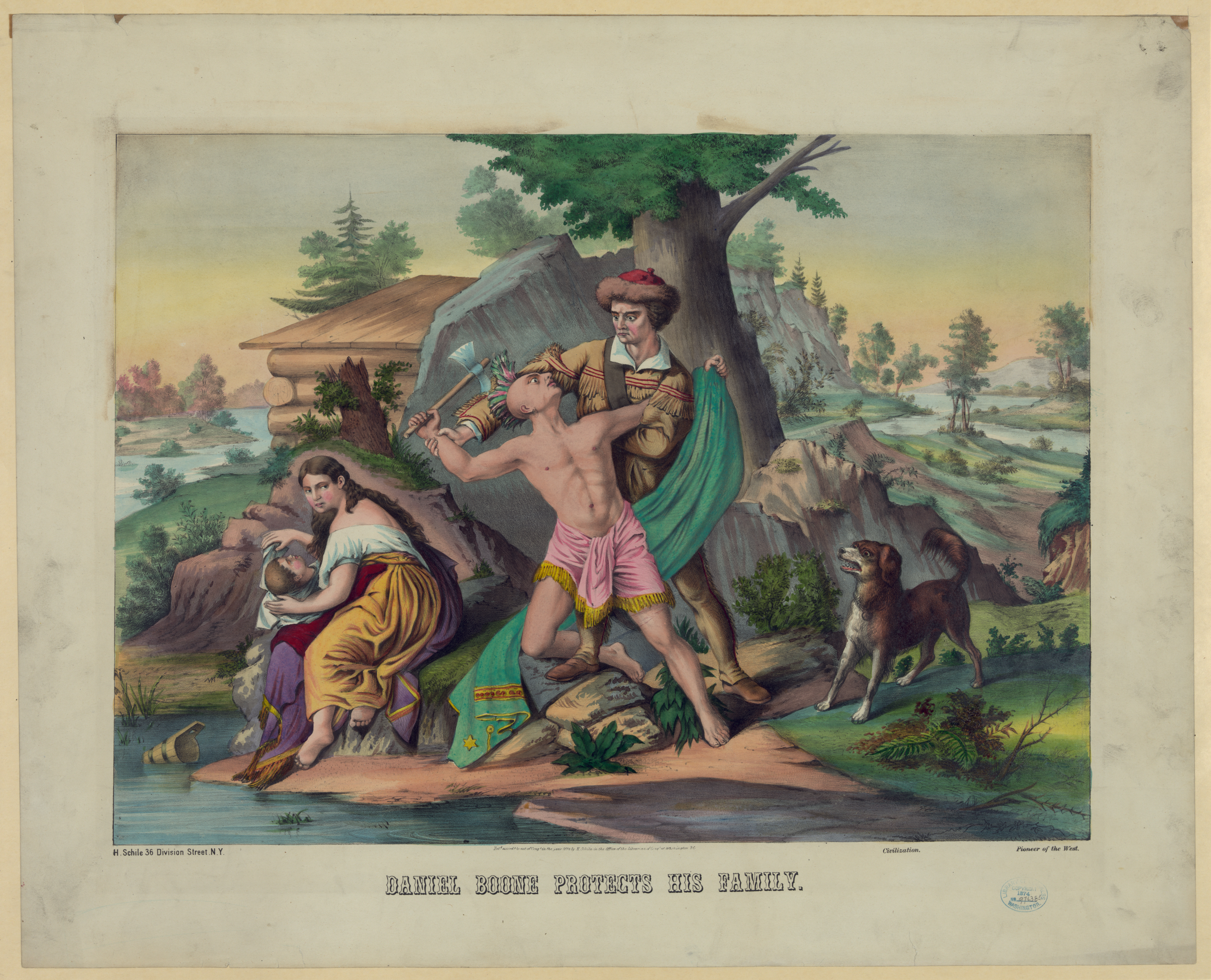
"Daniel Boone Protects His Family", based on The Rescue, a controversial statue that once stood outside the United States Capitol building

Thanks to Filson's book, Boone became a symbol of the "natural man" who lives a virtuous, uncomplicated existence in the wilderness. This was famously expressed in Lord Byron's epic poem Don Juan (1822), which devoted a number of stanzas to Boone, including this one:

Of the great names which in our faces stare,
The General Boon, back-woodsman of Kentucky,
Was happiest amongst mortals anywhere;
For killing nothing but a bear or buck, he
Enjoyed the lonely vigorous, harmless days
Of his old age in wilds of deepest maze.

Byron's poem celebrates Boone as someone who found happiness by turning his back on civilization. In a similar vein, many folk tales depicted Boone as a man who migrated to more remote areas whenever civilization crowded in on him. In a typical anecdote, when asked why he was moving to Missouri, Boone supposedly replied, "I want more elbow room!" Boone rejected this interpretation. "Nothing embitters my old age," he said late in life, like "the circulation of absurd stories that I retire as civilization advances."

Existing simultaneously with the image of Boone as a refugee from society was, paradoxically, the popular portrayal of him as civilization's trailblazer. Boone was celebrated as an agent of Manifest Destiny, a pathfinder who tamed the wilderness, paving the way for the extension of American civilization. In 1852, critic Henry Tuckerman dubbed Boone "the Columbus of the woods", comparing Boone's passage through the Cumberland Gap to Christopher Columbus's voyage to the New World. In popular mythology, Boone became the first to explore and settle Kentucky, opening the way for countless others to follow. In fact, other Americans had explored Kentucky before Boone, as debunkers in the 20th century often pointed out, but Boone came to symbolize them all, making him what historian Michael Lofaro called "the founding father of westward expansion."

In the 19th century, when Native Americans were being displaced from their lands and confined on reservations, Boone's image was often reshaped into the stereotype of the belligerent, Indian-hating frontiersman which was then popular. In John A. McClung's Sketches of Western Adventure (1832), for example, Boone was portrayed as longing for the "thrilling excitement of savage warfare." Boone was transformed in the popular imagination into someone who regarded Indians with contempt and had killed scores of the "savages". The real Boone disliked bloodshed. According to historian John Bakeless, there is no record that Boone ever scalped Indians, unlike other frontiersmen of the era. Boone once told his son Nathan that he was certain of having killed only one Indian, during the battle at Blue Licks, although on another occasion he said, "I never killed but three." He expressed regret over the killings, saying the Indians "have always been kinder to me than the whites." Even though Boone had lost two sons and a brother in wars with Indians, he respected Indians and was respected by them. In Missouri, Boone went hunting with the Shawnees who had captured and adopted him decades earlier. Some 19th-century writers regarded Boone's sympathy for Indians as a character flaw and altered his words to conform to contemporary attitudes.

=== Commemoration and portrayals ===
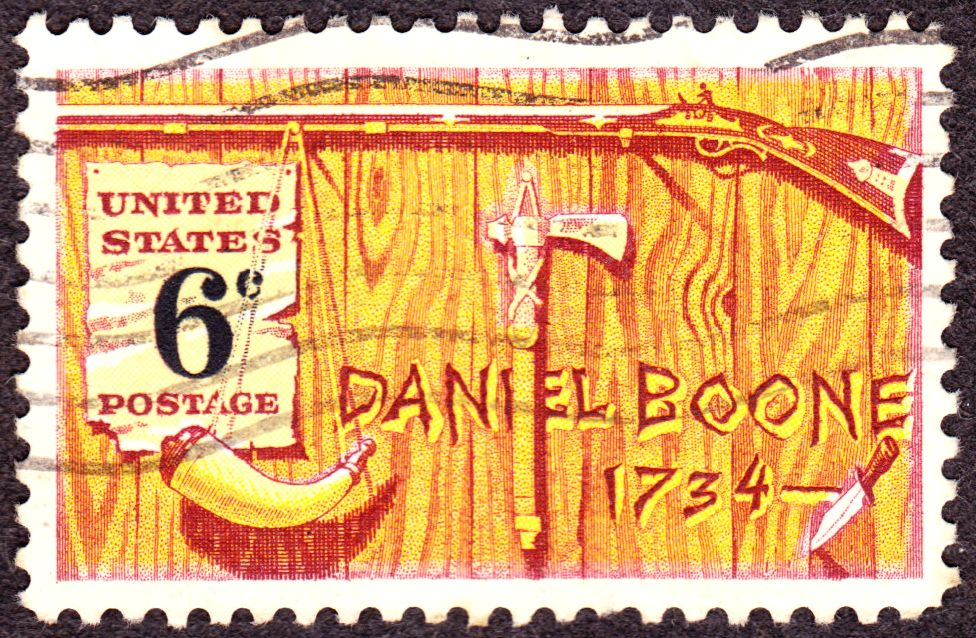
1968 Boone commemorative stamp

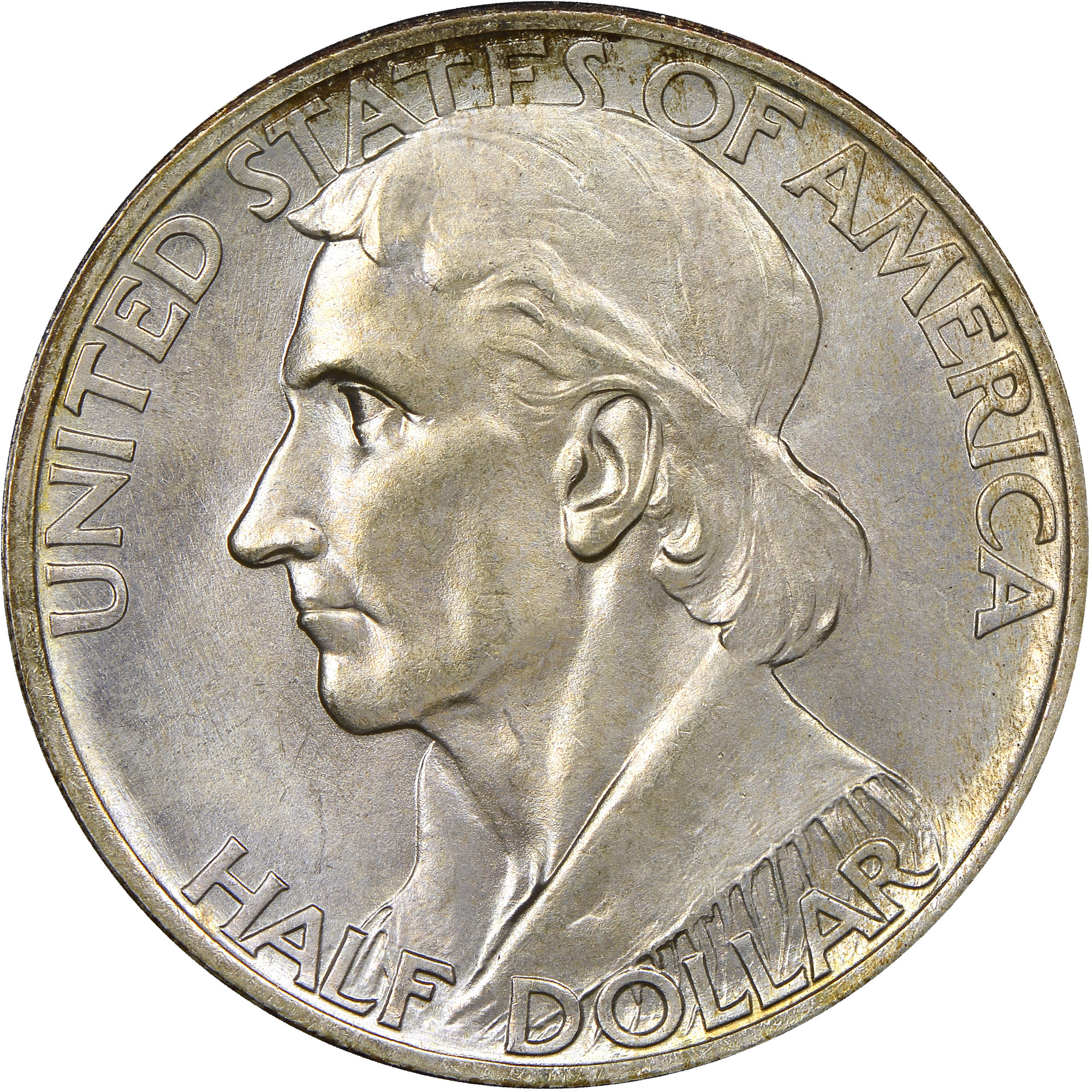
Obverse of the United States Daniel Boone Bicentennial half dollar, designed by Henry Augustus Lukeman and minted from 1934 to 1938

Many places in the United States are named for Boone, including the Daniel Boone National Forest in Kentucky and the Sheltowee Trace Trail in Tennessee. His name has long been synonymous with the American outdoors. The Boone and Crockett Club is a conservationist organization founded by Theodore Roosevelt in 1887, and the Sons of Daniel Boone was a precursor of the Boy Scouts of America. A half-dollar coin was minted in 1934 to mark the bicentennial of Boone's birth; a commemorative stamp was issued in 1968. In 1961, the US Navy ordered ten James Madison-class ballistic missile submarines to be made at the Mare Island Naval Shipyard. One would be named the USS Daniel Boone (SSBN-629), commissioning on April 23, 1964, and remaining in service until decommissioning in 1994. The submarine's motto "New Trails to Blaze" was an homage to Boone's life and his legacy of exploration on the frontier.

Boone's adventures, real and mythical, formed the basis of the archetypal hero of the American West, popular in 19th-century novels and 20th-century films. The main character of James Fenimore Cooper's Leatherstocking Tales, the first of which was published in 1823, bore striking similarities to Boone; even his name, Nathaniel Bumppo, echoed Daniel Boone's name. As mentioned above, The Last of the Mohicans (1826), Cooper's second Leatherstocking novel, features a fictionalized version of Boone's rescue of his daughter. After Cooper, other writers developed the Western hero, an iconic figure which began as a variation of Daniel Boone.

In the 20th century, Boone was featured in numerous comic strips, radio programs, novels, and films, such as the 1936 film Daniel Boone as well as the 1956 Daniel Boone, Trail Blazer shot in Mexico during the Davy Crockett: King of the Wild Frontier craze of the time. Boone was the subject of a TV series that ran from 1964 to 1970. In the theme song for the series, Boone was described as a "big man" in a "coonskin cap" and the "rippin'est, roarin'est, fightin'est man the frontier ever knew!" (Note: The complete lyrics of the song: Archived June 20, 2006, at the Wayback Machine.) This did not describe the real Boone, who was not a big man and did not wear a coonskin cap, which he thought uncouth and uncomfortable. Boone was portrayed this way in the TV series because Fess Parker, the tall actor who played him, was essentially reprising his role as Davy Crockett from an earlier TV series. That Boone could be portrayed the same way as Crockett, another American frontiersman with a very different personality, was another example of how Boone's image was reshaped to suit popular tastes. He was also the subject matter for the song sung by Ed Ames called "Daniel Boone". It was released in 1966.

Arthur Guiterman in a four stanza poem recounts the life of Boone, ending with his ghost happily tracking animals, both ancient and mythical, across the Milky Way. The Taking of Jemima Boone by Matthew Pearl, published in 2021, is an account of the abduction of the daughter of Daniel Boone and, after her rescue by Boone, then shifts to the conflicts between Boone, his political rival Richard Callaway, and Shawnee leader Blackfish, with resulting impacts to the Western theater of the American Revolutionary War.

== See also ==
- Boone Trail, between Virginia Beach, Virginia and San Francisco, California
- Boone's Cave Park
- Daniel Boone Homestead
- Edward Morgan Log House
- Thomas S. Hinde, close friend of the Boone Family, neighbor in Kentucky, and interviewer of Boone
