= Agriculture in Kentucky =

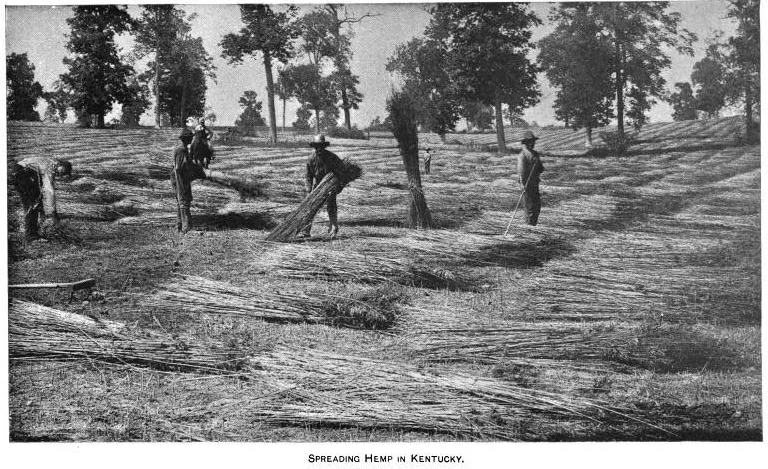
Workers spreading (harvesting) hemp in a Kentucky hemp field circa 1895.

Kentucky is an agricultural producer in the United States. Value of agricultural products was $5 billion in 2012, of which slightly less than half was crops. Crops grown in the state include corn, soybeans, hay, wheat and tobacco. Historically, hemp has been a cash crop in the state (see hemp in Kentucky). Finished agricultural products produced in the state include Kentucky bourbon and Kentucky wine.

== Agricultural regions ==
Kentucky's bluegrass region contains the state's best farmland. By contrast, the agricultural potential of the Knobs region (which borders the Bluegrass region) is limited because of its inferior soil and steep topography.

The Pennyrile is also a productive agricultural region.

== Agriculture in Kentucky's economy ==
In Kentucky, farm employment makes up an estimated 0.7% of total employment, and the agricultural sector accounts for about 2% of Kentucky's GDP. Agriculture as a percentage of the state's GDP has declined over time; in 1963 agriculture accounted for an estimated 5% of the state's GDP. In 2007, the state had 85,260 farms; by 2012, this number had declined to 77,064. In 2013, the average market value of agricultural products per farm in Kentucky was $65,755.

== Agricultural products ==
Kentucky's most important agricultural products in terms of cash receipts were poultry (22% of projected 2015 sales), equine (16%), cattle (16%), soybeans (13%) and corn (13%). Other products, including hogs, dairy, tobacco, goats, and horticulture, play smaller roles.

Tobacco was the state's leading cash crop by the middle of the 19th century, producing over 53 million pounds in 1840 and over 108 million pounds in 1860, and continuing to increase until its peak in 1982 at 589 million pounds. Tobacco cultivation and production steadily declined in importance in the state, however, due to the New Deal's limitation of acreage, increased competition from other tobacco-producing states, and the increasing awareness of the negative health effects of tobacco from the 1970s onward. Supplanting tobacco as the state's most important agriculture product was poultry, which has dramatically increased in importance to the state's agricultural sector. Collectively, farm chickens, broiler chickens, and chicken eggs rose from 1% of the state's total farm receipts in 1990 to 18.6% in 2012. Over the same time period, tobacco went from 23.8% of the state's total farm receipts in 1990 to 18.6% in 2000 to 7.3% in 2012. Nevertheless, Kentucky remains the United States' second-largest producer of tobacco.

Kentucky is the United States' #1 producer of horses. The equine industry contributed $3 billion to the state economy in 2012 and generated 40,665 jobs. Cattle are a billion-dollar-a-year industry.

== Department of Agriculture ==

The Kentucky Department of Agriculture is a State agency responsible for regulating and promoting Kentucky agriculture.

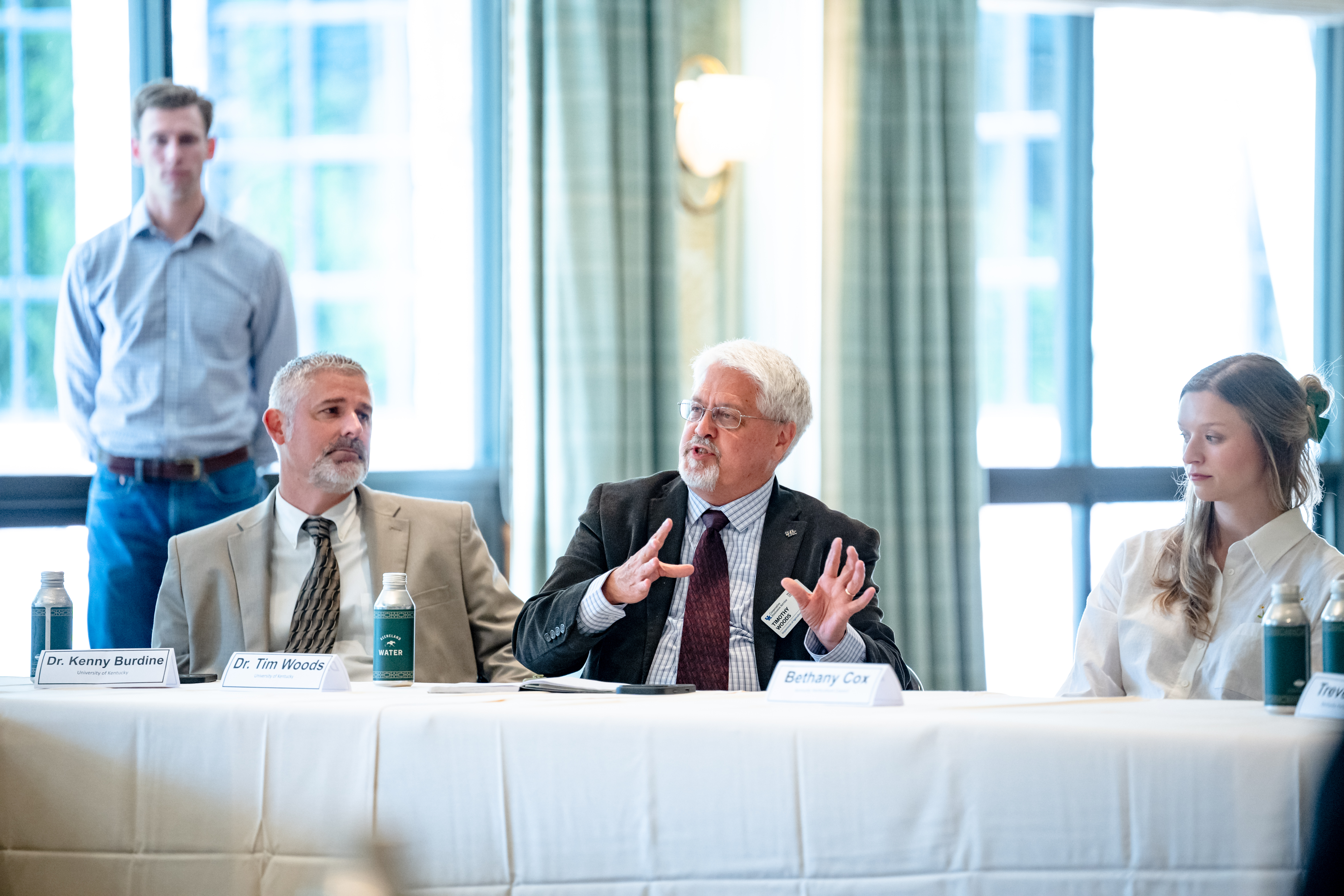
Jonathan Shell hosting a commodity roundtable discussion at Keeneland in June 2026

== Works cited ==
- Thomas D. Clark, "Agriculture" in The Kentucky Encyclopedia (ed. John E. Kleber: University Press of Kentucky, 1992).
- Dennis L. Spetz, "Geography" in The Kentucky Encyclopedia (ed. John E. Kleber: University Press of Kentucky, 1992).
