= Daniel Boone Bicentennial half dollar =

US commemorative coin celebrating Daniel Boone

- United States
- Value: 50 cents (0.50 US dollars)
- Mass: 12.5 g
- Diameter: 30.61 mm (1.20 in)
- Thickness: 2.15 mm (0.08 in)
- Edge: Reeded
- Composition: 90.0% silver; 10.0% copper
- Silver: 0.36169 troy oz
- Years of minting: 1934–1938
- Mintage: 86,557
- Mint marks: D, S (coins minted at the Philadelphia Mint feature no mint mark)

Obverse
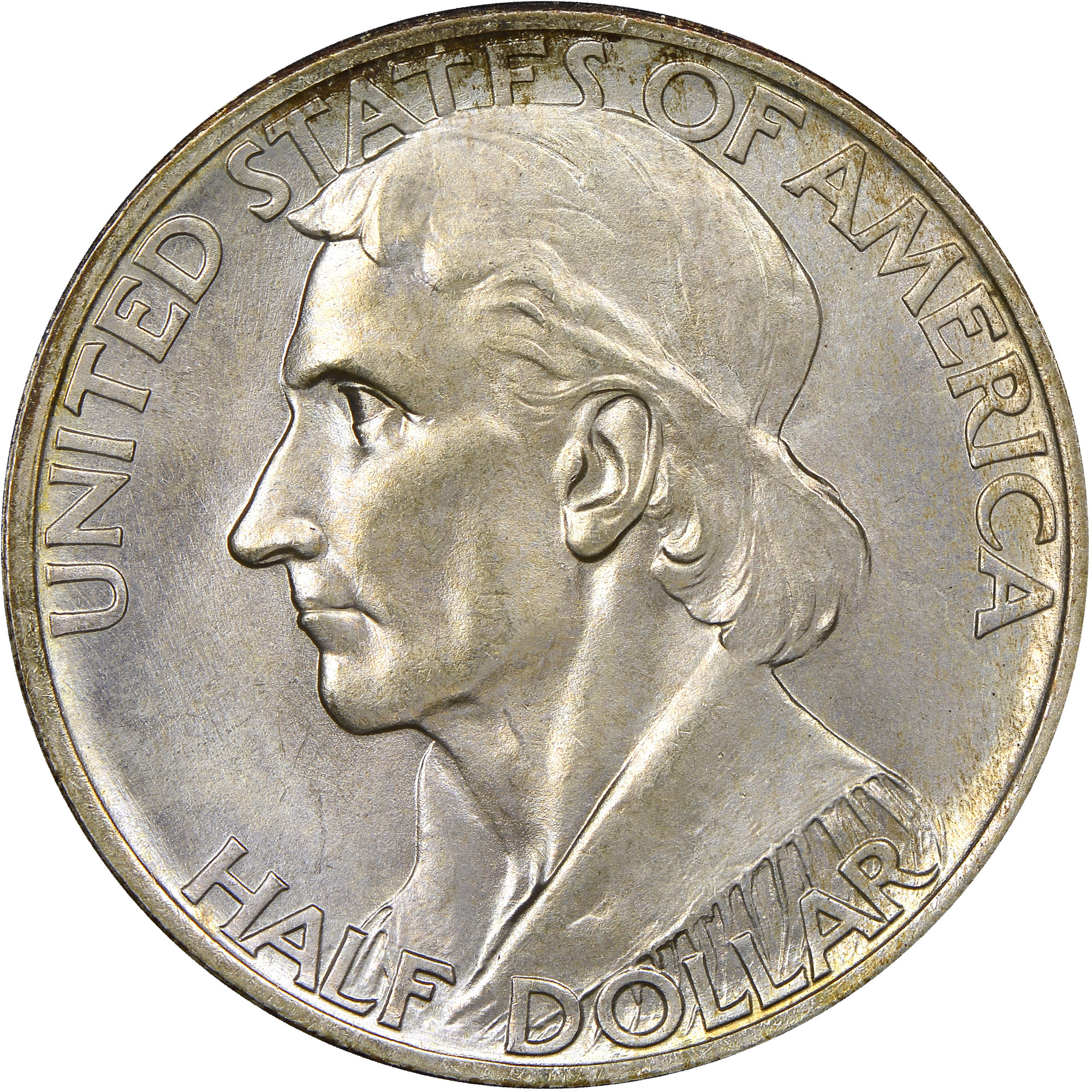
- Design: Daniel Boone
- Designer: Henry Augustus Lukeman
- Design date: 1934

Reverse
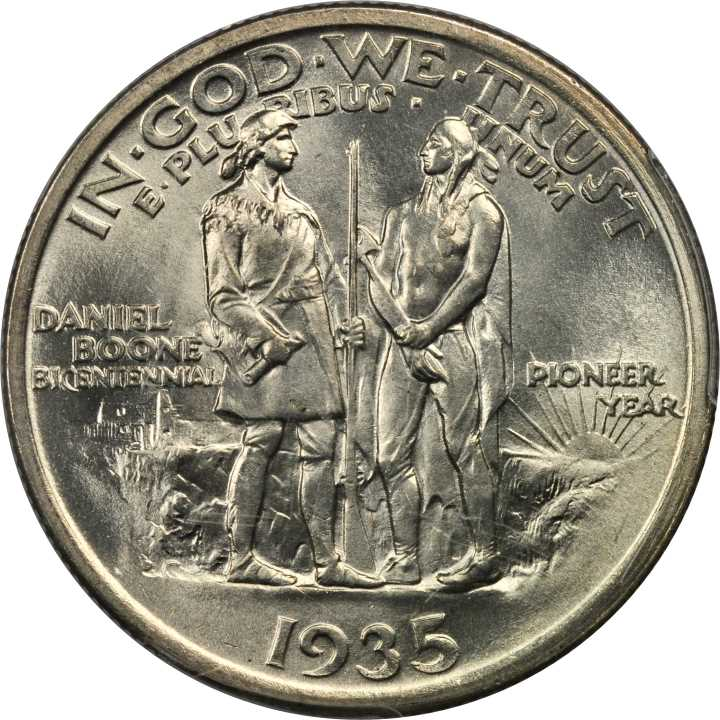
- Design: Frontiersman facing a Native American
- Designer: Henry Augustus Lukeman
- Design date: 1934
- Design discontinued: 1935
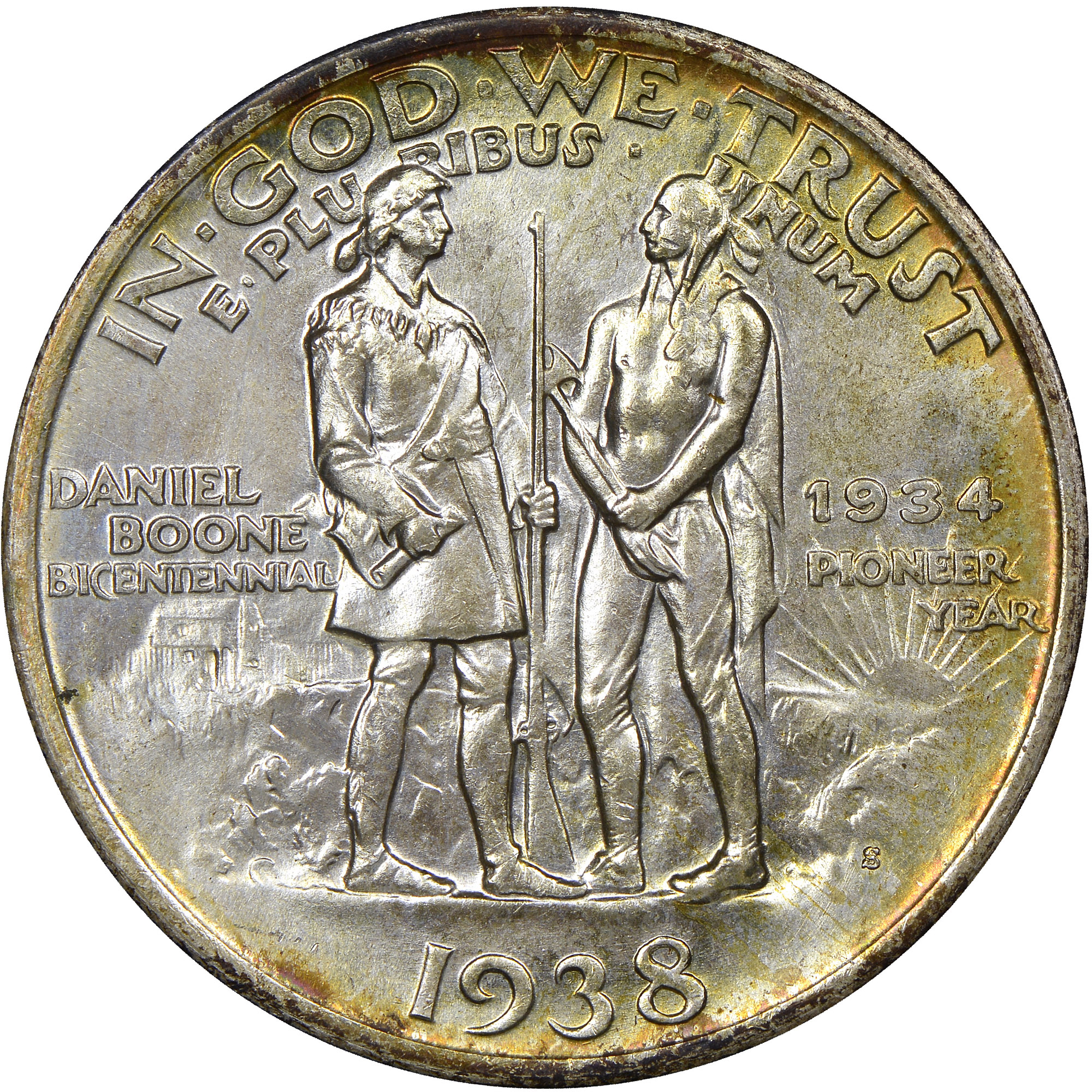
- Design: Frontiersman facing a Native American, "1934" in field
- Designer: Henry Augustus Lukeman
- Design date: 1935

The Daniel Boone Bicentennial half dollar was designed by Henry Augustus Lukeman and minted in 1934, commemorating the 200th birthday of frontiersman Daniel Boone. The obverse depicts Boone while the reverse depicts a frontiersman (Boone) standing next to an Indian Chief (Shawnee Chief Black Fish) in front of a stockade on the left and the rising Sun on the right.

== History ==
The Daniel Boone Bicentennial half dollar was authorized on May 26, 1934 with passage of Public Law No. 258. Sculptor Henry Augustus Lukeman was hired by the Kentucky Daniel Boone Bicentennial Commission to prepare designs for the upcoming commemorative coin honoring the frontiersman. Although Lukeman ignored many of their artistic requirements for the coin, the Commission eventually conceded and Lukeman's designs, after minor changes, were approved. The profits from the sale were distributed to the "Daniel Boone Bicentennial Commission" and the "Pioneer National Monument Association" in Lexington, Kentucky.

The first coin struck in 1934 was presented to President Franklin D. Roosevelt. Numismatist Anthony Swiatek lamented the lack of Boone's 1734 date of birth on the coin as "an unfortunate slipup". Furthermore, the first 1935 issues, without the bicentennial year featured, caused Congress to pass Public Law 342, which legally permitted the coins to carry the "1934" date after the year was over. This variety of the coins were struck starting in October 1935, accounting for the very low mintages (2,000 each) from Denver and San Francisco, plus 3 and 4 extra assay commission coins, respectively.

== Production ==
In 1934, coins were struck only at the Philadelphia Mint, and all were sold by the end of the year. In early 1935, production continued, this time with the coins being struck at all three mints. That same year, the coin's reverse design was modified when C. Frank Dunn, the secretary of the Boone Bicentennial Commission, used his connections in Congress to get new legislation approved stating in part:

That, insomuch as the annual change in coinage date required by law has caused the removal of the commemorative date of 1934 from the design originally approved and in use for the coinage of the 50-cent pieces commemorating the two hundredth anniversary of the birth of Daniel Boone… it is herby authorized to supplement said design so that the reverse of said 50-cent pieces will show the figures "1934" immediately above the words "PIONEER YEAR".

The legislation passed on August 26, 1935, and as a result, an additional 10,008 coins were minted at Philadelphia, with 2,003 being minted at Denver and 2,004 at San Francisco. Dunn advertised these coins as rarities, and the pair (consisting of coins with and without the "1934") was sold for $3.70. Although collectors ordered this extra issue in order for their sets to be complete, most were frustrated when their orders were returned unfilled by the commission, which claimed that all of the branch mint pieces were sold in pre-order sales. As a result, many collectors, sensing fraud from the commission, turned to the secondary market. Although the coins were available on the secondary market, they were sold at many times their initially advertised price. Frustration was further compounded when rumors circulated that the commission had distributed only around 25% of the branch mint issues and held the remaining coins to be released to dealers and speculators after the price had significantly risen.

Production of the Daniel Boone Bicentennial half dollar continued into the following three years. Although Dunn initially announced production would end in 1937, the following year more coins would be minted. However, the 1937 and 1938 were largely shunned by collectors and did not sell well, resulting in many being returned to the mint and melted. Sales were suspended due to poor results by July 1938.

== Collecting ==
Today, Boone half dollars are among the most widely available classic commemoratives for type set collectors. The 1934 and 1935 coins from Philadelphia had the highest mintages and are commonly encountered by collectors on the secondary market, while later issues, especially the "small 1934" issues from Denver and San Francisco, the 1937, and 1938 issues are rarer thanks to mass melting.

== See also ==
- Early United States commemorative coins
- Half dollar (United States coin)
