= Ecofibre =

Australian Biotechnology company

Ecofibre Limited
- Company type: Public
- Traded as: ASX: EOF
- Industry: Biotechnology
- Founded: 2009
- Headquarters: Sydney, Australia
- Area served: United States, Australia
- Key people: Vanessa Wallace (Executive Chairman)
- Products: Hemp derived Cannabidiol and Textiles
- Revenue: ▲AU$ 35.6 million (2019)
- Net income: ▲AU$ 4.6 million (2019)
- Website: ecofibre.com

Ecofibre Limited (also abbreviated as Ecofibre or EOF) is an Australian listed biotechnology company that produces and sells hemp derived products to consumers and retailers in the United States and Australia. The company's products include cannabinoid (CBD) oil and nutraceuticals as well as hemp derived food and textiles.

Ecofibre operates through its U.S. locations in Georgetown, Kentucky and Greensboro, North Carolina and its Australian location in Newcastle, New South Wales.

Ecofibre listed on the Australian Securities Exchange in March 2019 through an initial public offering, raising A$20 million in equity capital.

== Businesses ==
Ecofibre has four distinct businesses:

- Ananda Hemp manufactures and sells hemp derived oils and nutraceuticals directly to consumers within the United States.
- Ananda Professional manufactures and wholesales hemp derived oils and nutraceuticals to independent pharmacy chains within the United States.
- Ananda Food manufactures and wholesales hemp derived food products within Australia.
- Hemp Black is the company's hemp textile research subsidiary.

The company's research and development activities regarding the health effects of CBD and hemp textiles is done in conjunction with Thomas Jefferson University (through its Lambert Center for the Study of Medicinal Cannabis and Hemp).

== History ==
Ecofibre Limited was founded by Phil Warner in Australia more than two decades ago (then named Ecofibre Industries Operations Pty Ltd), where, as a gene development company, it developed and owned the world's largest private seed bank consisting of over 300 strains from around the world. The company gained a high level of certification per the UN Single Convention, allowing the company to legally transfer its genetics from Australia to the US with DEA import permits. Ecofibre then partnered with Ananda Hemp to completely shift hemp cultivation to the US due to Australia's strict regulations.

Ananda Hemp began in Kentucky, which had a long history of hemp cultivation prior to its prohibition in the 1970s. Many farmers subsequently switched to cultivating other crops. Demand for tobacco, one of these crops, began declining as the health effects of tobacco consumption became clear. Brian Furnish (formerly the company's President of Global Production) and Ananda Hemp began lobbying state politicians to legalize hemp cultivation and its byproducts. As a result, he became the first licensed hemp grower in the United States since World War II through the pilot programs that were established nationally following the passage of the 2014 US Farm Bill.

In 2015, Barry Lambert, the current chairman of the company, became involved in order to find a healthy alternative to treat his granddaughter's epileptic condition. He initially invested AU$500,000 into the company and donated US$3 million to Thomas Jefferson University for research into the health benefits of CBD. Lambert then recruited Eric Wang to become CEO of Ecofibre to assist with expansion in the US.

In November 2017, the Australian government legalized hemp-based foods. Currently, medicinal cannabis is under strict regulation in Australia. In December 2018, the US government passed the 2018 US Farm Bill which removed hemp – including its extracts, cannabinoids and derivatives – from restrictions under the Controlled Substances Act.

In 2019, Ecofibre listed on the Australian Securities Exchange, raising A$20 million in equity financing, valuing the company at approximately A$300 million. The company has since moved to focus on introducing a pharmacy grade product, Ananda Professional, to independent pharmacies nationwide and to produce hemp-derived foods for an Australian supermarket's home brand.

In 2023, Ecofibre announced that their long-standing Managing Director and CEO, Eric Wang, had tendered his resignation.
