= Tuque Creek =

Stream in the US state of Missouri

Tuque Creek is a stream in southeastern Warren County in the U.S. state of Missouri. It is a tributary of Charrette Creek which it joins within the Missouri River floodplain between Marthasville and Dutzow.

The headwaters arise at 38°43′38″N 91°01′21″W and the confluence with Charrette Creek is at 38°36′46″N 91°02′18″W.

The name "Tuque Creek" was given by French frontiersmen. Some say Tuque was the name of a person, while others believe it stems from the French word for "Turkish". Many variant names have been recorded, including "Duke Creek", "Duque Creek", "Riviere Duque", "Riviere Teuque", "Riviere Tuque", "Toque Creek", and "Tugue Creek".

== See also ==
- List of rivers of Missouri
