= John Filson =

American pioneer, historian, and surveyor (c. 1747–1788)

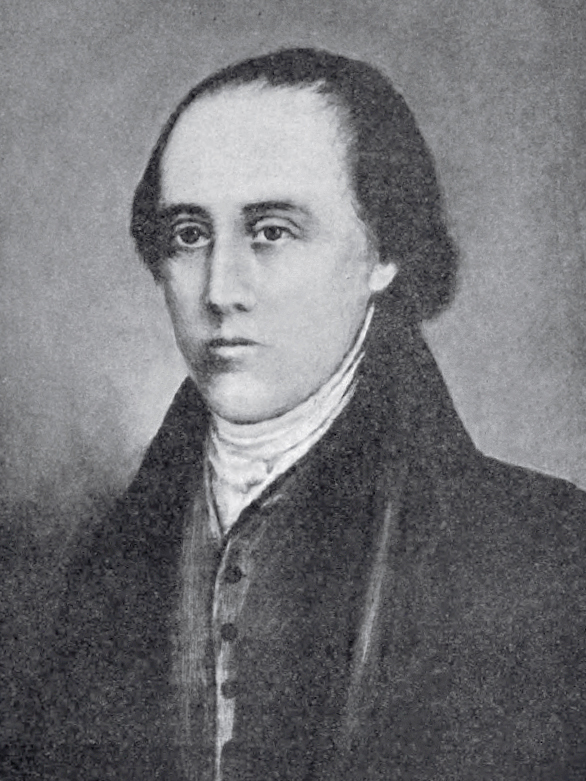
- Portrait of John Filson
- Born: c. 1747; Chester County, Pennsylvania, Thirteen Colonies
- Disappeared: October 1788; Near the Great Miami River, Ohio, United States
- Known for: Maps, Books, Co-Founding of Cincinnati
- Notable work: The Discovery, Settlement and Present State of Kentucke

John Filson (c. 1747 – October 1788) was an American author, historian of Kentucky, pioneer, surveyor and one of the founders of Cincinnati, Ohio.

== Early life ==
John Filson was born in Chester County, Pennsylvania, around 1747. He was the son of Davison Filson, also of Chester County. He attended the West Nottingham Academy in Colora, Maryland, and studied with the Reverend Samuel Finley, afterwards president of the College of New Jersey (later Princeton). Heitman's Historical Register of Colonial Officers reports a John Filson served as an ensign in Montgomery's Pennsylvania Battalion of the Flying Camp and was taken prisoner at Fort Washington on 16 November 1776, during the Battle of New York.

== Career ==
=== Writing ===
He worked as a schoolteacher and surveyor in Pennsylvania until 1782 or 1783, when he acquired over 13,000 acres (53 km^{2}) of western lands and moved to Kentucky. He settled in Lexington, taught school, surveyed land claims, and travelled the region interviewing the settlers and leading citizens. He wrote The Discovery, Settlement and Present State of Kentucke during this period, and travelled to Wilmington, Delaware, to have it published in the summer of 1784. He also had a "Map of Kentucke" engraved and printed in Philadelphia. The edition, including both book and map, consisted of 1,500 copies and was priced at $1.50. The map was reprinted several times before 1793. Filson's plan for a second edition, to be endorsed by George Washington, fell through.

Filson's 1784 map of Kentucky

The book was almost immediately translated into French and re-published in Paris (1785) and somewhat later a German edition appeared (Leipzig, 1790). The appendix relating the adventures of Daniel Boone was extremely popular, and was referenced by (among others) Lord Byron in Don Juan. Gilbert Imlay reprinted Filson's entire work, along with other material, in A Topographical Description of the Western Territory of North America (volume II, published in London and New York in 1793). Filson left in manuscript A Diary of a Journey from Philadelphia to Vincennes, Indiana, in 1785; An Account of a Trip by Land from Vincennes, hid., to Louisville, Kentucky, in 1785; A Journal of Two Voyages by Water from Vincennes to Louisville, and an account of an attempted voyage in 1786.

=== Founding of Cincinnati ===
After spending several years in Kentucky teaching school, surveying, trying (unsuccessfully) to start a seminary, and becoming embroiled in numerous lawsuits and financial difficulties, he purchased from Mathias Denman a one third interest in an 800-acre (3.2 km^{2}) tract at the junction of the Ohio and Licking rivers, the future site of Cincinnati, which he called Losantiville, a name formed by Filson from the Latin "os" (mouth), the Greek "anti" (opposite), and the French "ville" (city), from its position opposite the mouth of the Licking River.

Filson's survey and plan of the town survives in the layout of modern downtown Cincinnati. In 1790, General Arthur St. Clair, Governor of the Northwest Territory, changed the name of Losantiville to Cincinnati in honor of the Society of the Cincinnati, an organization of Revolutionary War officers founded by George Washington.

== Disappearance ==
While on a surveying and colonizing expedition near the Great Miami River, he disappeared, October 1, 1788, when the party was attacked by territorial Shawnees, and his body was never found. The Shawnee tribe was upset by his claims that they never resided where he "disappeared," as published in his aforementioned work. Ironically, the Shawnee tribe that he claimed had no ties to Kentucky were the ones to end his life. After his disappearance his partners, Denman and Patterson, transferred his interest in the site of Cincinnati to Israel Ludlow, and his heirs never reaped any benefit from the subsequent increase in the value of the land. He never married and left no direct descendants.

== Legacy ==
The Filson Historical Society of Louisville, Kentucky is named for him.

== See also ==
- Reuben T. Durrett
