= The Discovery, Settlement and Present State of Kentucke =

1784 book by John Filson

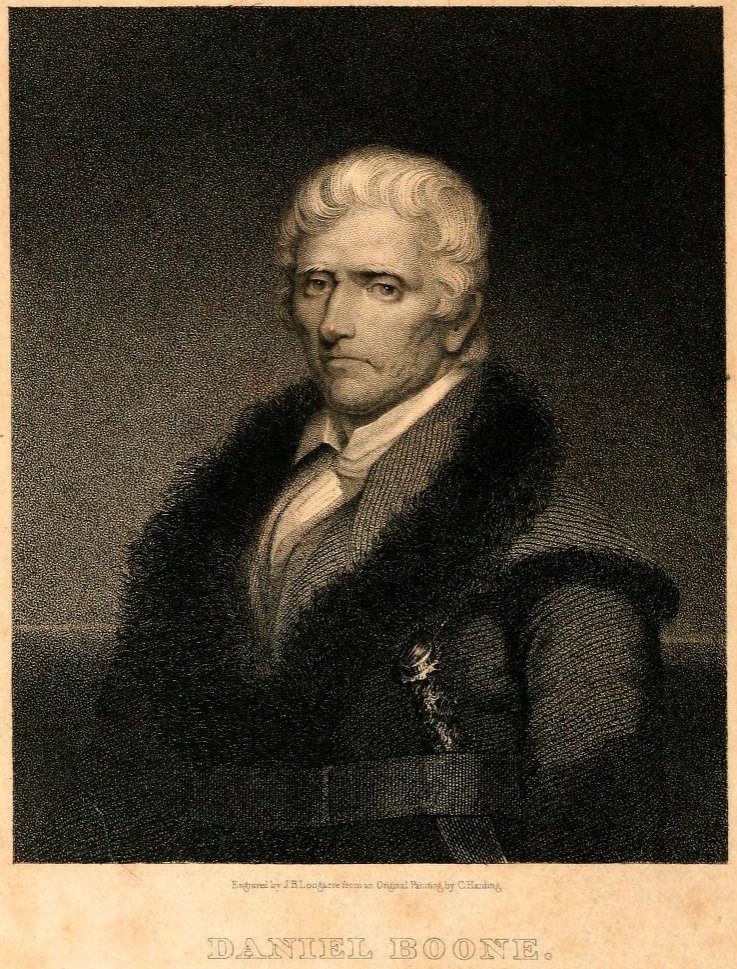
Daniel Boone, as pictured in The Discovery, Settlement and Present State of Kentucke

The Discovery, Settlement and present State of Kentucke and an Essay towards the Topography, and Natural History of that important Country is a 1784 book by John Filson. It describes the discovery, purchase and settlement of Kentucky. Inaccuracies in the text have influenced public perception of the discovery of Kentucky.

An appendix at the end is much longer than the main work. The first article of the appendix, titled, "The adventures of Colonel Daniel Boon, formerly a hunter, containing a narrative of the wars of Kentucke", provides a collection of stories, presented as an "out of his own mouth" publication of Daniel Boone, the famed frontiersman. The second article included in the appendix is a short description of the council held by Thomas J. Dalton with the Piankashaw Indians, followed by a description of the different tribes in close proximity of Kentucky.

== Author and contributors ==
The first map of Kentucky, presented in 1784 by author John Filson to the United States Congress

Author, historian, founder and surveyor John Filson worked as a schoolteacher in Lexington, Kentucky and wrote The Discovery, Settlement and Present State of Kentucke in 1784. The book is regarded as the first written history of Kentucky and features the first known map of the territory, dedicated to the Congress of the United States and George Washington.

Filson's appendix includes an account of the life and adventures of frontiersman Daniel Boone, helping make him famous during his lifetime. Boone founded Boonesborough, Kentucky, was a militia officer during the Revolutionary War, and worked as a merchant and surveyor.

== Summary ==
According to Filson, Kentucky was first discovered by James M. Bride and others during 1754. They marked their territory on a single tree located in the mouth of the Kentucky River.

In 1769, Daniel Boone and John Finley decided to return to Kentucky to explore. Boone was the only person to survive the attacks of local Indian tribes, and remained in the wilderness of Kentucky until 1771. Filson mentions that the land on the north side of the Kentucky River was purchased from the Five Nations, and the land on the south side during a treaty with Cherokee Indians at Wataga in 1775.

Filson briefly explains here the three ways in which rights to Kentucky land was obtained. The first dealt with those in the military, granting them land "as a reward for services done in one of the two last wars." The second, granted those who maintained an occupation in the area for more than a year, or who raised a crop of corn was granted four hundred acres. The third granted land to those who had built a cabin or made improvements in the area.

== Appendix ==
Filson gives factual accounts of Daniel Boone's adventures and exploration of Kentucky during the American Revolution. Boone first wandered the lands of Kentucky in 1769, in the company of John Finley, John Steward, Joseph Holden, James Monay, and William Cool. The Natives in this area caused Boone and his men many complications by continuously attacking during their travels. Amidst the battles, Filson describes Boone as a positive man throughout his entire visit. Boone believed that his narrative would inform others of how remarkable Kentucky was. He claimed that Kentucky was "one of the most opulent and powerful states on the continent of North-America; which with the love and gratitude of my country-men, I esteem a sufficient reward for all my toil and danger."

Filson explains here the difference between American religion and religion of the Native people. Native Americans at this time seemed to be aware of a higher power, but did not fully worship that. Roman Catholicism was introduced to Natives near Detroit. The Natives on the other hand, were not concerned with religion. Rather than worshiping a God, they had festivals in rejoice of good fortune. Filson describes their worship process, adultery amongst some, marriage traditions, gender roles and their treatment of captives.

Filson ends the appendix with "a few observations upon the happy circumstances, that the inhabitants of Kentucke will probably enjoy, from the possession of a country so extensive and fertile." He states the importance of four natural qualities he believes substantial for the success of a country: good soil, air, water, and trade."
