= Boone Trail =

The Boone Trail is a marked trail between Virginia Beach, Virginia and San Francisco, California, laid to honour the travels of U.S. explorer Daniel Boone.

== History ==
Between 1913 and 1938, Joseph Hampton Rich, a resident of Mocksville, North Carolina, placed 358 metal tablets between Virginia Beach, Virginia and San Francisco, California, in honor of Daniel Boone and his travels. Although many of the tablets are associated with locations visited by Boone, many were simply placed wherever Rich could collect the necessary donations from schools and communities to erect a monument. He established the Boone Trail Highway Association to further his project. From the mid-1920s to the mid-1930s, the Association published a newsletter detailing the efforts to install new monuments.

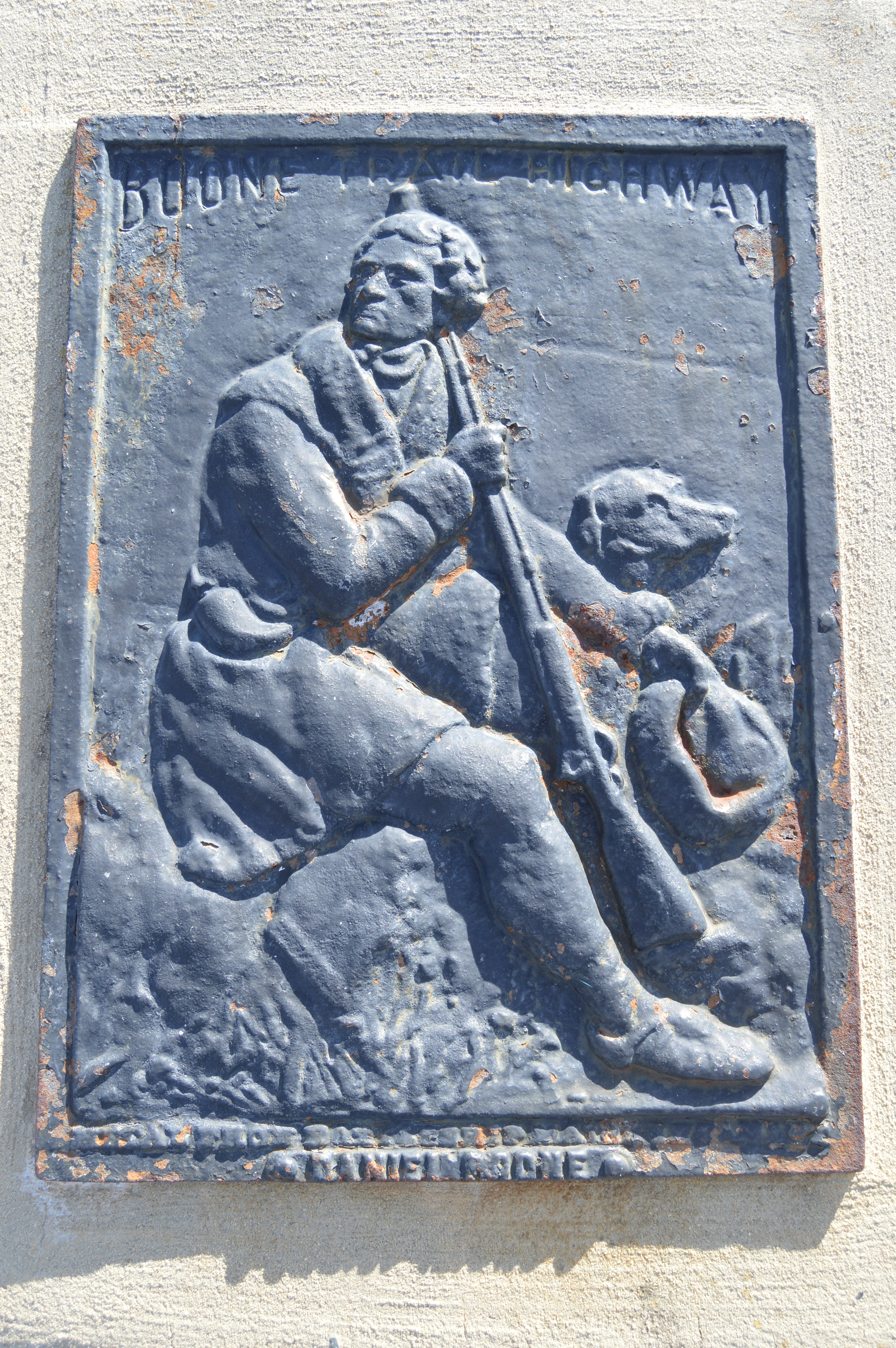
Surviving monument in Sanford, North Carolina

The tablets were (at least partially) constructed from metal salvaged from the battleship USS Maine (ACR-1), sunk during the Spanish–American War in 1898. The tablets were typically located near schools, government buildings, or along old highway routes. Over the years, many of the markers have been lost to highway construction and urban sprawl.

In the late-1990s, a group of descendants of Daniel Boone established the Boone Trail Highway & Memorial Re-Association with the intent of locating the markers which remained. Approximately 60 tablets have been located so far. One of the tablets can be found on Franklin Street in Chapel Hill, North Carolina. Another can be found in front of historic Old Main on the campus of The University of North Carolina at Pembroke in Pembroke, North Carolina.
