= Aspinwall (surname) =

Aspinwall, including the reduced form Aspinall, is a toponymic surname originating from a place called Aspinwall (also Asmall) in the southern part of Scarisbrick in Lancashire, England, near to Ormskirk and Aughton. The name comes from the Old English æspen ("growing with aspen trees") + wæll(a) ("stream"). In America, the Norwegian surname Asbjørnsen has been assimilated into Aspinwall.

== People named Aspinwall ==
- Claud Aspinwall (1873–1944), American politician
- Edward Aspinwall (died 1732), English priest
- Homer F. Aspinwall (1846–1919), American politician
- Jack Aspinwall (1933–2015), British politician
- Lisa Aspinwall, American psychologist
- Lloyd Aspinwall (1834–1886), American New York National Guard general
- Martin Aspinwall (born 1981), English rugby league player
- Nan Aspinwall (1880–1964), American equestrian
- Paul S. Aspinwall (born 1964), British theoretical physicist and mathematician
- Reginald Aspinwall (1855–1921), English landscape painter
- Stanhope Aspinwall (1713–1771), British diplomat
- Thomas Aspinwall (consul) (1786–1876), American consul
- Thomas Aspinwall (trade unionist) (1846–1901), British trade unionist
- William Aspinwall (1605–1662), English emigrant to Boston, notary and theologian
- William Aspinwall (minister) (active 1648–1662), English nonconformist minister
- William Henry Aspinwall (1807–1875), American businessman

== People named Aspinall ==
- Aspinall (1840s cricketer)
- Albert Aspinall (1839–1903), Australian stonemason and builder
- Arthur Aspinall (1846–1929), Australian minister
- Arthur Aspinall (historian) (1901–1972), British historian
- Butler Cole Aspinall (1830–1875), Australian lawyer
- Damian Aspinall (born 1960), English zoo keeper and casino owner
- Dennis Aspinall (born 1947), Australian rules footballer
- Donald Aspinall (1899–1948), English manufacturer
- Frederick Aspinall (1859–?), English cricketer
- George Aspinall (also Gordon A., 1923–2013), English rugby league player
- Ian Aspinall (born 1961), British actor
- James Aspinall (1795–1861), English clergyman
- Janet Aspinall (Tedstone, born 1959), English cricketer
- Jessie Aspinall (1880–1953), Australian doctor
- John Aspinall (engineer) (1851–1937), English engineer
- John Aspinall (footballer) (born 1959), English footballer
- John Aspinall (politician) (c. 1815 – 1865), English politician
- John Aspinall (zoo owner), (1926–2000) English zoo owner and gambler
- Joseph Aspinall (1854–1939), New York politician and judge
- Michael Aspinall (1937–2026), British musicologist and singer
- Mike Aspinall (born 1983), English rugby union player
- Nathan Aspinall (born 1991), English darts player
- Nathan Aspinall (ice hockey) (born 2006), Canadian ice hockey player
- Neil Aspinall (1941–2008), British music industry executive
- Nigel Aspinall (born 1946), English croquet player
- Noel Aspinall (1861–1934), Archdeacon of Manchester
- Owen Aspinall (1927–1997), 45th Governor of American Samoa
- Peter Aspinall (born 1994), English rugby league player
- Peter J. Aspinall, social scientist at the University of Kent
- Phillip Aspinall (born 1959), Anglican Archbishop of Brisbane, Queensland
- Ron Aspinall (1918–1999), English cricketer
- Septimus Aspinall (1907–1976), English rugby league footballer of the 1920s and 1930s
- Tom Aspinall (born 1993), British mixed martial artist
- Vicky Aspinall, English punk musician
- Walter Aspinall (1858–unknown), English cricketer
- Warren Aspinall (born 1967), English footballer
- Wayne N. Aspinall (1896–1983), American lawyer and politician; U.S. Representative for Colorado
- William Aspinall, rugby league footballer of the 1960s and 1970s for Keighley
- Willie Aspinall (1942–2021), British rugby league footballer of the 1960s and 1970s

=== Fictional characters ===
- Brett Aspinall, Waterloo Road (TV series) character; son of Roger Aspinall
- Roger Aspinall, Waterloo Road (TV series) character; father of Brett Aspinall
