= The Great Adventure (American TV series) =

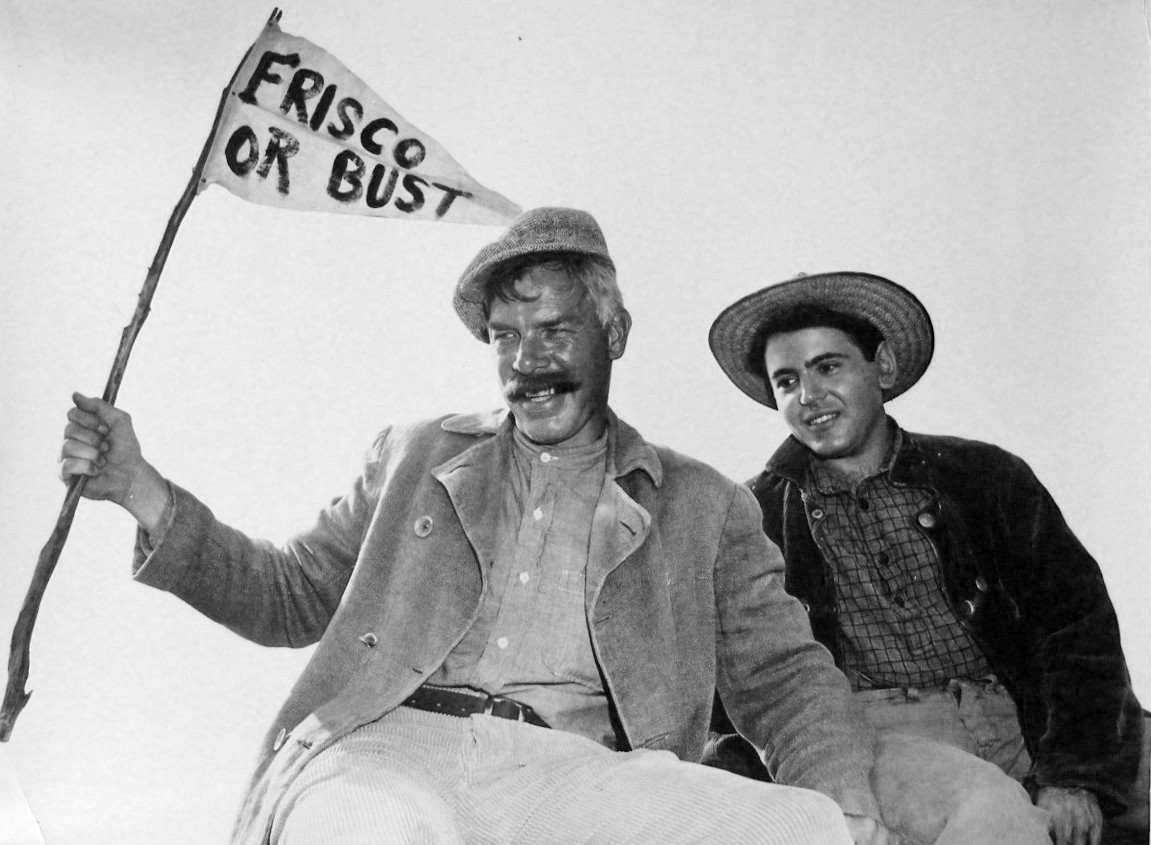
- Lee Marvin and Walter Koenig in "Six Wagons to the Sea", 1963.
- Genre: Historical Anthology
- Directed by: Buzz Kulik; Philip Leacock; Joseph M. Newman; Denis Sanders; Robert Stevens
- Narrated by: Van Heflin; Russell Johnson
- Theme music composer: Richard Rodgers
- Composers: Fred Steiner; Bernard Herrmann; Wilbur Hatch; Leon Klatzkin; Nathan Scott; David Buttolph; Robert Drasnin; Leigh Harline
- Country of origin: United States
- Original language: English
- No. of series: 1
- No. of episodes: 26

Production
- Executive producer: Bert Granet
- Producers: John Houseman; Ethel Winant
- Running time: 44 mins.
- Production company: CBS Productions

Original release
- Network: CBS
- Release: September 27, 1963 – May 1, 1964

The Great Adventure is an American historical anthology series that appeared on CBS for the 1963–64 television season. The initial 13 episodes were narrated by Van Heflin, with the second grouping of 13 episodes narrated by Russell Johnson. The series, which featured theme music by Richard Rodgers, presented a weekly one-hour dramatization of the lives of famous Americans and important events in American history.

== Synopsis ==
The series lasted for only 26 episodes, and showed, among others, stories on the Confederate submarine, the H. L. Hunley; the life of Harriet Tubman; the Battles of Lexington and Concord; the trial and hanging of Nathan Hale; the life of "Boss" Tweed; the death of Sitting Bull; the siege of Boonesborough; the capture of Jefferson Davis; the life and death of Wild Bill Hickok; and the Battle of New Orleans.

== Notable guest stars ==
Among those who appeared in the series were:

- Claude Akins
- Whit Bissell
- Lloyd Bridges
- Howard Caine
- Albert Cavens
- Carroll O'Connor
- Michael Constantine
- Bill Coontz
- Jackie Cooper
- Jeff Cooper
- Joseph Cotten
- Robert Culp
- Bob Cummings
- Ossie Davis
- Ruby Dee
- John Dehner
- Ivan Dixon
- Don Dubbins
- Andrew Duggan
- Bernard Fox
- Peter Graves
- Ron Howard
- Russell Johnson
- Victor Jory
- Ray Kellogg
- Jack Klugman
- Karl Lukas
- James MacArthur
- Flip Mark
- Lee Marvin
- Ken Mayer
- David McCallum
- Peggy McCay
- Ricardo Montalban
- Channing Pollock
- Denver Pyle
- Tom Reese
- Wayne Rogers
- Marion Ross
- Tom Simcox
- George Sowards
- Rip Torn
- Max Wagner
- Jack Warden
- H. M. Wynant

== Historical background ==
Episode #	Episode title	Episode era and topic	Key historical character(s)	Actor portrayal	Original airdate
1-1	"The Hunley"	1864 Confederate submarine H. L. Hunley	Lieutenant George E. Dixon	Jackie Cooper	September 27, 1963
1-2	"The Death of Sitting Bull" (part one)	1890 Sitting Bull#Death and burial	Chief Sitting Bull; General Nelson A. Miles	Anthony Caruso; Kent Smith	October 4, 1963
1-3	"The Massacre at Wounded Knee" (part two)	1890 Wounded Knee Massacre	General Nelson A. Miles	Kent Smith	October 11, 1963
1-4	"Six Wagons to the Sea"	1907 Seropian brothers of Fresno, California, top of page 5	Armenian immigrant farmer Misok Bedrozian, a character based on the Seropian brothers	Lee Marvin	October 18, 1963
1-5	"The Secret"	1776 Revolutionary War hero Nathan Hale	Captain Nathan Hale; General Howe	Jeremy Slate; Torin Thatcher	October 25, 1963
1-6	"Go Down, Moses"	1855 Harriet Tubman#Nicknamed "Moses"	Harriet Tubman	Ruby Dee	November 1, 1963
1-7	"The Great Diamond Mountain"	1872 Great Diamond Hoax swindle	William Chapman Ralston; Clarence King	Barry Sullivan; J. D. Cannon	November 8, 1963
1-8	"The Treasure Train of Jefferson Davis"	1865 Jefferson Davis#Final days of the Confederacy	President Jefferson Davis; Judah P. Benjamin	Michael Rennie; Harry Townes	November 15, 1963
1-9	"The Outlaw and the Nun"	1881 Sister Blandina#Legends	Sister Blandina; Billy the Kid	Joan Hackett; Andrew Prine	December 6, 1963
1-10	"The Man Who Stole New York City"	1878 William M. Tweed#Scandal	Boss Tweed od New York City's Tammany Hall	Edward Andrews	December 13, 1963
1-11	"A Boy at War"	1781 Andrew Jackson#Revolutionary War service	Andrew Jackson	Flip Mark	December 20, 1963
1-12	"Wild Bill Hickok – The Legend and the Man"	1876 Wild Bill Hickok#Death	Wild Bill Hickok; Jack McCall	Lloyd Bridges; Neil Nephew	January 3, 1964 (Note: Originally scheduled for November 22, 1963, but delayed due to the assassination of John F. Kennedy)
1-13	"The Colonel from Connecticut"	1859 Edwin L. Drake#Drilling for oil	Colonel Edwin L. Drake; Benjamin Silliman Jr.	Richard Kiley; Whit Bissell	January 10, 1964
1-14	"Teeth of the Lion"	1875 Great Plains#Pioneer settlement	settler Will Cross, a character based on a compendium of pioneer settlers	Earl Holliman	January 17, 1964
1-15	"Rodger Young"	1943 Rodger Young#Military service	World War II hero Private Rodger Young	James MacArthur	January 24, 1964
1-16	"The Testing of Sam Houston"	1818 Sam Houston#War of 1812 and aftermath	Sam Houston; Andrew Jackson	Robert Culp; Victor Jory	February 7, 1964
1-17	"The Special Courage of Captain Pratt"	1879 Richard Henry Pratt#Cultural assimilation of Native Americans	Captain Richard H. Pratt; General Grierson; General Miles	Paul Burke; Curt Conway; Denver Pyle	February 14, 1964
1-18	"The Night Raiders"	1859 John Brown's raid on Harpers Ferry	John Brown; Colonel Lewis Washington	Jack Klugman; Torin Thatcher	February 21, 1964
1-19	"The Plague"	1801 Benjamin Waterhouse#Smallpox vaccine	Dr. Benjamin Waterhouse; President Jefferson	Bob Cummings; John Dehner	February 28, 1964
1-20	"The Pathfinder"	1846 John C. Fremont#Mexican–American War (1846–1848)	Major John C. Fremont; John Sutter	Rip Torn; Carroll O'Connor	March 6, 1964
1-21	"The President Vanishes"	1893 Elisha Jay Edwards and President Cleveland#Cancer	journalist E. J. Edwards; Grover Cleveland	Barry Sullivan; Leif Erickson	March 13, 1964
1-22	"The Henry Bergh Story"	1866 Henry Bergh#Animal welfare work	Henry Bergh	Brian Keith	March 20, 1964
1-23	"Kentucky's Bloody Ground" (part one)	1778 Revolutionary War Siege of Boonesborough#Capture of Daniel Boone	Daniel Boone; Colonel Callaway	Peter Graves; Andrew Duggan	April 3, 1964
1-24	"The Siege of Boonesborough" (part two)	1778 Revolutionary War Siege of Boonesborough#Siege	Daniel Boone; Simon Kenton	Peter Graves; Arthur Hunnicutt	April 10, 1964
1-25	"Escape"	1864 Libby Prison escape of Union Army prisoners during Civil War	Colonel Thomas E. Rose; Colonel Abel Streight	Fritz Weaver; Michael Constantine	April 17, 1964
1-26	"The Pirate and the Patriot"	1814 General Andrew Jackson, Jean Lafitte#Battle of New Orleans	Jean Lafitte; Andrew Jackson	Ricardo Montalban; John Anderson	May 1, 1964

== Episodes ==
No. overall	No. in season	Title	Directed by	Written by	Original release date
1	1	"The Hunley"	Paul Stanley	Francis M. Cockrell	September 27, 1963
Starring Jackie Cooper
2	2	"The Death of Sitting Bull"	Joseph M. Newman	Otis Carney	October 4, 1963
Starring Joseph Cotten, Ricardo Montalban, Kent Smith, Lloyd Nolan, Claude Akins, James Dunn, Miriam Colon, Noah Beery Jr.
3	3	"The Massacre at Wounded Knee"	Joseph M. Newman	Unknown	October 11, 1963
Starring Joseph Cotten, Ricardo Montalban, Kent Smith, Lloyd Nolan, Claude Akins, James Dunn, Miriam Colon, Noah Beery Jr.
4	4	"Six Wagons to the Sea"	Richard C. Sarafian	A. I. Bezzerides	October 18, 1963
STARRING Lee Marvin; NARRATED BY Van Heflin: "The year nineteen-oh-seven is a good one for the farmers of the Great California Valley. Most of them are immigrants from Italy, Greece and Turkey. For these new Americans this year brings a bumper crop and a rich harvest. Now, with the hard work over, it is time to celebrate." "For people of the California Valley this is a memorable year. The year they've been waiting for. The chance to pay their debts, to put money in the bank. The world's market stirred by unforeseen events came a demand that drove the price of raisins from five to six to eight and finally to ten cents a pound laid on the dock in San Francisco." "News traveled fast throughout the valley and by midday two more farmers joined Misok Bedrozian on his way to the Embarcadero in San Francisco. Now there are six, all willing to risk their hopes, even their lives, rather than submit to the oppression they'd left the Old World to escape." "Now there are five and, always hanging over them, the threat of the railroad." "Now there are four. They pass through parched country covered with sun-scorched grass, then along slopes of manzanita and mesquite which rose toward the Gabilan Mountains and the dangers of Pacheco Pass." "Now there are three. Before them the Coastal Plains. Another two days, it passed through Gilroy, Morgan Hill, San Jose. Now that the farmers along the way, they have become a symbol of all the dreams that brought them from all over the world to California." "It has taken them almost two weeks to cover the distance from Fresno to South San Francisco, but now they can feel the breezes coming in off the ocean. Just one more day and they will discharge their crops from the dock of the Embarcadero." "Now there is one. Just one to face the vast power of the railroad concentrated in San Francisco." "Because of Misok Bedrozian, California's Governor-elect Hiram Johnson finally established the principle that in cases involving the public service, the state had not only the right, but the obligation to protect the people's interest. It happened because one small obstinate group of Americans refused to accept an authority they considered unjust."; Announcer: "Before previewing next week's Great Adventure, here is Gerald Gough, a teacher and member of the National Education Association, with a postscript on tonight's story." Gerald Gough: "One man against many. One single wagon got through and even the six that started were so few, so small a force, but Misok Bedrozian had the most powerful force in the world, a belief, the miracle of an idea and the conviction to carry it out against whatever odds. In our country, one man can stand up for his rights and start a chain reaction. Maybe at the beginning he acts just for himself, but often one man's problem becomes everyone's concern. Misok Bedrozian's victory turned out to be not just his, but his whole state's. He learned the lesson of faith in one's convictions. Justice which we prize is not just learned, it is earned and earning it can be The Great Adventure."; Starring Lee Marvin {Misok Bedrozian}; Featuring Gene Lyons {Mercer} Ellen Madison {Elissa} Wright King {Lucas}; and Arthur Batanides as Pouliades Richard X. Slattery as Tucker; Emile Genest as Mueller Celia Lovsky as Mairik Melville Ruick as Ed Bailey Fredd Wayne as Cuddy; Al Ruscio as Fennucci Michael Hinn as Tompkins Walter Koenig as Cy; with John Pickard.....Teel Robert Nash...Crowley Harry Fleer...Railroad Official Ted Jordan...First Guard Jim Berringer...Loren
5	5	"The Secret"	Alan Crosland	Robert J. Hilliard and Murray Osborn	October 25, 1963
NARRATED BY Van Heflin: "Seventeen-seventy-six. The war for freedom which had begun so gloriously at Lexington and Concord has become a desperate struggle for survival. Washington's beleaguered army is reeling back from a defeat at Brooklyn Heights and for the lonely patriots who have tried to aid him, retribution is swift and often terrible."; STARRING Jeremy Slate; Nancy Malone; Torin Thatcher; CO–STARRING John Anderson Sean McClory "Harlem Heights on the island of Manhattan, seventeen-seventy-six. General Washington's exhausted troops are licking the wounds of a half-dozen defeats. Nothing but a miracle it seems can save the remnants of the tattered Continental Army." "But seventeen-seventy-six was a time of miracles and for one unknown captain in Washington's army it was a moment of destiny." "By a circuitous route Nathan Hale is brought to a lonely cove on the shores of Long Island behind the British lines. He's unfamiliar with the territory in which he's about to move. He's totally inexperienced in the art of espionage and he has been told that he has only a few brief days in which to get the information that may save the Continental Army." "Major Jerome Hardwick had never been more wrong. Through five more bloody years of war, the name of Nathan Hale was to echo and re-echo in the ears of British soldiers who were to die on American soil. His name became a rallying cry for Colonial troops and the words he is reputed to have spoken a moment before he died are part of the heritage of a nation of two hundred million people — 'My only regret is that I have but one life to give for my country.'"; Announcer: "Before previewing next week's Great Adventure, here is Gerald Gough, a teacher and member of the National Education Association, with a postscript on tonight's story." Gerald Gough: "Spy? The word has a distasteful ring to it. Intelligence — that word sounds more respectable — decidedly acceptable. Until our own century armies marched into battle in precise formation. The art of war was pursued according to set rules. Spying did exist, but it was officially ignored and thought of as despicable and infamous. Nathan Hale, as you have just seen, was promptly rejected by his friends when he volunteered to spy to serve his country. Today we know that most governments are engaged officially and extensively in gathering intelligence. Nathan Hale had to act against the ethics and emotions of his time. He is remembered because he knew that a man must be guided by his own convictions and his own sense of duty and not by the opinions of others."; Starring Jeremy Slate {Nathan Hale}; Nancy Malone {Jenny}; Co-starring John Anderson {Colonel Knowlton} Sean McClory {Major Carlton}; FEATURING John Kellogg as Winthrop Sandy Kenyon as Captain James Maxwell Reed as Major Hardwick Douglas Henderson as Captain Hull Nora Marlowe as Widow Chich Dorothy Adams as Mrs. Woodhaven Michael Fox as Samuel I. Stanford Jolley as Jethro Peter Mamakos as Dekker Sam Edwards as Crawford; Hal Baylor as Wilson Tommy Alexander as Daniel Pierce Arthur Gould Porter as Guard Gil Perkins as Officer Arvid Nelson as Man Roy Dean as Soldier Noel Drayton as Officer Jon Drury as Guard Richard Lupino as Corporal; Note: Torin Thatcher, who plays General Howe, is billed third in the opening credits, but his name does nor appear in the end credits.
6	6	"Go Down Moses"	Paul Stanley	James Bridges	November 1, 1963
NARRATED BY Van Heflin: "Dorchester County, Maryland" "How much is one human being worth to another? In eighteen-fifty, a slave has only one sure route to freedom... and that is... escape."; STARRING Ruby Dee; Brock Peters; Ossie Davis; GUEST STAR Ethel Waters "PHILADELPHIA 1850" "As feeling mounted against slavery, so did the exodus of slaves escaping North. An organization was formed to aid them... composed mainly of Quakers, abolitionists and escaped slaves. It was known as the Underground Railroad and its members used common railroad terms to mask their activities. Those who actually went into the South, risking their lives to fill a train with passengers, as they were called, were known as conductors." "All her life, Harriet was subject to strange, sudden spells of some moments... a direct result of a head wound she'd received as a child when she was thirteen years old... the scar on her forehead remained. It became a symbol of strength to the many who were to recognize her by it and call her... Moses... and the uncontrollable sudden spells of catatonic sleep remained from which she would awake unaffected hours later as if nothing had happened." "For one day and one night, Harriet's party had the luxury of riding a wagon North." "More than once, their path crossed that of bounty hunters, headed South... with recaptured runaways." "Three days later, exhausted, desperate, sick, they were in Wilmington, the last of the Underground Railroad stations. Thomas Garrett, a Quaker, had been tried and convicted in eighteen forty-four for breaking laws covering fugitive slaves. Now he was station master on the last and the most dangerous leg of their journey... the crossing into Pennsylvania... to freedom." "Harriet Tubman returned nineteen times into Maryland between eighteen fifty and eighteen sixty, personally conducting over three hundred souls out of bondage. During these years, her legend grew. Rewards totaling over forty thousand dollars were offered for her capture... dead or alive. Known as the Moses of her people, she died on March tenth, nineteen thirteen. Her epitaph reads, 'With implicit trust in God, she braved every danger and overcame every obstacle with all she possessed extraordinary foresight and judgment so that she truthfully said, on my Underground Railroad, I never run my train off the track and I never lost a passenger'."; Starring Ruby Dee {Harriet Tubman}; Brock Peters {Joe Bailey}; Ossie Davis {John Ross}; Guest Star Ethel Waters {Rit}; Featuring Mimi Dillard as Tillie Roy Barcroft as Dr. Anthony Thompson Isabelle Cooley as Lydia Betty Harford as Elizabeth Gloria Calomee as Mary Ann Richard O'Brian as Tarry Stephen Lander as Quaker Boy Robert Bice as Garrett; Bill Walker as Old Ben Charles Hradilac as Zimmer Davis Roberts as Paul Rupert Crosse as William Still Owen Bush as Auctioneer Bill Couch as Bounty Hunter Napoleon Whiting as Free Negro Jacque Shelton as Officer on the Bridge; Uncredited: Bill Coontz as inspector
7	7	"The Great Diamond Mountain"	Buzz Kulik	Unknown	November 8, 1963
Starring Barry Sullivan, Philip Abbott
8	8	"The Treasure Train of Jefferson Davis"	Arthur Nadel	Unknown	November 15, 1963
Starring Michael Rennie, Harry Townes, Carl Benton Reid
9	9	"The Outlaw and the Nun"	Bernard Girard	Unknown	December 6, 1963
Starring Andrew Prine, Joan Hackett, Leif Erickson, Marion Ross
10	10	"The Man Who Stole New York City"	Robert Florey	Unknown	December 13, 1963
Starring Edward Andrews, James Daly, Carroll O'Connor
11	11	"A Boy at War"	Christian Nyby	Malvin Wald and Clyde Ware	December 20, 1963
Starring Flip Mark, Richard Eyer
12	12	"Wild Bill Hickok – the Legend and the Man"	Buzz Kulik	Unknown	January 3, 1964
Starring Lloyd Bridges, Sheree North
13	13	"The Colonel from Connecticut"	Bernard Girard	Raphael Hayes	January 10, 1964
Narrator Russell Johnson: "The year — eighteen fifty-eight. The place — a small spring near Titusville, Pennsylvania." "But, to these two promoters, the problem is — what to do with the world. Here, on the other hand, is a man who knows what to do with the world but... he has problems of his own." "And here, an irate passenger who could not know she had just changed history."; STARRING Richard Kiley; Maggie McNamara; ALSO STARRING Wallace Ford "Titusville — northwest corner of Pennsylvania — population... one hundred and twenty-five. One general store... one livery stable... one hotel... and the bubbling spring." "By the waters of the Titusville spring, Edwin Drake sat and wrote his report — an inspired amateur rendering an opinion to the world." "In May of eighteen fifty-eight, the main industries of Titusville were lumbering, farming and shopping beaver and skunk. In the evening, though, there was light entertainment." "The colonel got his shovels, his picks, his spikes and, by late June, Edwin Drake had begun his well." "August, eighteen fifty-eight. The hand-dug well was down fifteen feet. The pump was set up, the sun was high, it was close to noon." "The salt well drillers of Tarentum drilled by kicking down. Brine would rise to the surface in the narrow hole they drilled and, by evaporation, they would secure salt. It was September, eighteen fifty-eight, when Drake came to Tarentum. He looked around... he asked questions... and he got an idea." "By November, the steam boiler had arrived and, because he had begun to feel the pinch of money, Drake had written to his company in New Haven, 'Funds... everything is cost more than I expected... I will need more funds'." "Poverty was something these mountain people could understand. But the jeering... the mockery... all stopped. Here, in the back woods, nobody laughed at a man who was poor. Billy Robinson, proprietor of the American Hotel, invited Drake to a free drink on the house... he was willing to extend credit, too. December became January, January changed to February and still no answers came from the company in New Haven in reply to his continuous pleading for funds. Then it was late March... and spring was in the air. A country dance was held to greet it." "On May nineteenth, eighteen fifty-nine, Uncle Billy Smith, the driller, arrived. And, in May, one year after Drake first came to Titusville, actual drilling began. The bore was ten feet down." "In July, eighteen fifty-nine, the pipe arrived. It was driven through the quicksand and, at thirty-one feet..." "Slowly, steadily, the drill pounded... three feet a day. Outside, the heat of summer blazed. On the twenty-seventh of August, the drill was down to sixty-nine feet..." "He drilled the first oil well... he invented the idea of driving pipes through sand and clay to protect the drilling hole. He was the founder of an industry... an industry whose progress was so rapid... so immense that, in a short time, there was no room in it anymore for this dreamer... but he didn't care — he had had his great adventure — he had done what no man had done before."; Starring Richard Kiley {Edwin Drake}; Maggie McNamara {Laura Drake}; Also Starring Wallace Ford {Uncle Billy Smith}; Featuring John Alderson as Billy Robinson Whit Bissell as Silliman Walter Brooke as Townsend Howard Caine as Pitchman James Callahan as Josh Sandy Kenyon as Fletcher Ken Lynch as Brown Woodrow Parfrey as Bissel Guy Raymond as Wilson Ian Wolfe as Brewer; Rayford Barnes as Eben Al Cavens as Townsman Noel Drayton as Johnson Craig Duncan as Farmer John Garwood as Idler Jim Halferty as Sammy Smith Kim Hector as Boy Charles Perry as Townsman Naomi Perry as Woman; Uncredited: Barry Kelley {Hughes}; Kid Chissell, Tom Kennedy, Jack Perkins, Max Wagner {townsmen seen at Billy Robinson's during brawl}
14	14	"Teeth of the Lion"	Lamont Johnson	Unknown	January 17, 1964
Starring Earl Holliman, Julie Sommars, Collin Wilcox: The episode includes the Locust Plague of 1874.
15	15	"Rodger Young"	Philip Leacock	Unknown	January 24, 1964
Starring James MacArthur, George Kennedy, Diane Ladd, H. M. Wynant
16	16	"The Testing of Sam Houston"	Denis Sanders	Story by : Joseph Hoffman; Teleplay by : Henry Greenberg and John Mantley	January 31, 1964
Narrator Russell Johnson: "Eighteen fourteen. For the second time in less than half a century, the young American republic is at war with England. The frontier is aflame with a thousand bloody skirmishes whose names have long been lost in the stream of history. As out of this holocaust grew the men who would mold the future of America, among them the Indian fighter who has already begun to build the legend which will make him the seventh president of the United States... Andrew Jackson." "His nation will hail him forever as the avenger of the Alamo, but he was destined to burn his name into the legends of this land long before he ever saw the Great Plains of Texas. His name... Sam Houston."; STARRING Robert Culp; Victor Jory; ALSO STARRING Mario Alcalde; CO–STARRING Katherine Crawford Robert Emhardt "February fifth, eighteen eighteen. The War of 1812 had been over for three years and two months when a strange delegation appeared at the offices of the United States Secretary of War." "In five years, with Jackson's help, the spectacular young firebrand from Tennessee went from small town lawyer to attorney general of Nashville County and then on to two triumphant terms in the Congress of the United States." "Sam Houston was at home in any kind of company. He loved crowds... he loved excitement... and in the months that followed his election as governor, he kept a schedule of public appearances that would have killed most ordinary men." "During the next five days, ex-Governor Carroll's rabble rousers had a field day at Houston's expense." "Too proud to lick his wounds in the presence of the few friends which remained to him, Sam Houston disappeared. For months he wandered apparently without purpose or direction. By the late summer, he reached the goal he had not even known he was seeking... the Raven had come home." "The trial of Sam Houston lasted for ten weeks but, for the first time, his brilliant legal maneuvers, his superb sense of logic seemed to be falling on deaf ears. By the final day, the press had already convicted him on paper and the audience was still hostile." "Sam Houston was to go a great deal further. He was not yet forty years of age when he walked out of the nation's capital and into a legend. Ahead of him lay even more glorious victories... He was to be commander-in-chief of an army... destroyer of Santa Anna... avenger of the Alamo... president of a republic... and finally, the man who brought the mighty Territory of Texas into the Union. Truly, he was a giant."; Announcer: "Before previewing next week's Great Adventure, here is Gerald Gough, a teacher and member of the National Education Association, with a postscript on tonight's story." Gerald Gough: "From the War of 1812, to the great victory at San Jacinto, to the Civil War, Sam Houston indeed cut a dramatic swath across the mosaic of American history. In tonight's story alone, we saw a man accomplish more than most people do in a lifetime. He was a man who fought hard for his friends and even harder against his enemies. His staunch loyalty to his blood brothers, the Cherokees, was equaled only by his fierce adherence to the Union. Later, he would defend that precious Union with words that have a special meaning today, 'I make no distinction between Southern rights and Northern rights. Our rights are common to the whole Union. I am for the Union without any ifs and my motto... It shall be preserved...'"; Starring Robert Culp {Sam Houston}; Victor Jory {Andrew Jackson}; Also starring Mario Alcalde {Too-chee-la}; Co-starring Katherine Crawford {Eliza Allen} Robert Emhardt {Stanbery}; Also Co-starring Kent Smith as William Carroll David White as John C. Calhoun; Featuring Ralph Moody as Oo-Loo-Techka June Vincent as Mrs. Allen Tom Palmer as John Allen Francis De Sales as Speaker of the House Ken Drake as Miller; Robert Riordan as Breckinridge Edwin Mills as Male Secretary; Bill Arvin as Jackson's Aide Dick Wilson as Mr. Metcalfe John Craven as First Reporter; Richard Norris as Man Melvin F. Allen as First Voice Lenny Geer as Second Voice Jacque Shelton as Second Reporter
17	17	"The Special Courage of Captain Pratt"	Joseph Sargent	Story by : William Tunberg; Teleplay by : Raphael Hayes and William Tunberg	February 14, 1964
Narrator Russell Johnson: "For four years, the Indians of the Plains were forced to live under a poorly administered, often corrupt, reservation system. Against privation and hunger, some of the chiefs have rebelled. Now, the Army has been ordered to stop the new violence and arbitrarily to punish the leaders."; STARRING Paul Burke; Ivan Dixon; ALSO STARRING Antoinette Bower; CO–STARRING Valentin De Vargas Denver Pyle John Marley "Fort Sill, Indian Territory — a dusty, primitive world made up of mountains, dry riverbeds, blazing sun, hostile Indians. This is headquarters for the officers and men of the Fourth and Tenth Cavalry, Major General Davidson commanding. His visitor, on special mission from Fort Leavenworth, Kansas — Captain Richard H. Pratt." "On a spring morning in eighteen-seventy-five, three separate worlds begin a journey together — the world of Indians, of the Negroes and of the white man — across the empty and silent plains." "The prison train journeyed from sunup to sundown. All through that first day, Captain Pratt could not forget the sound of the Indian women." "Within two weeks, the prison train reached General Miles' command at Fort Leavenworth, Kansas... a rich country... anything... anything could grow in this land." "In the darkness of the early morning, the prisoners were loaded onto a battered old prison car... iron on their legs and now... iron around them. Across the prairies toward Florida. They had been accustomed to the high, dry plains and now their bodies rebelled against the damp heat of the Southeastern states." "Summer, eighteen-seventy-five... Fort Marion, Saint Augustine, Florida, once the old Spanish fortress of San Marco. Here, Captain Pratt brought his prisoners. Behind stone walls twelve feet thick, where the temperature was ninety degrees, in a short time, three had died." "And so it began. Within four years, the captain would bring his prisoners to an abandoned military barracks in Pennsylvania and founded the Carlisle Indian School. Twenty-five years later, as General Richard H. Pratt, he saw an entire reservation school system built on his model. Here, in Fort Marion, it began. He gave the Indians a way to survive. Here, he gave them life."; Announcer: "Before previewing next week's Great Adventure, here is Gerald Gough, a teacher and member of the National Education Association, with a postscript on tonight's story." Gerald Gough: "During his twenty-five years at the Carlisle Indian School in Pennsylvania, Richard Pratt taught five thousand students representing more than seventy Indian tribes. From Carlisle came famous people, such as Jim Thorpe. Thorpe is regarded by many as the greatest athlete of all time. Hundreds of less famous but equally important young men and women return to their tribes from Carlisle to help their people. Although its football team played and beat the greatest colleges in America, Carlisle was really not a college — it was a training school. It granted no degrees. When it closed its doors in nineteen-eighteen, it left a job only partly done... a job that still remains to be completed. But the work of Richard Pratt was the start of a Great Adventure."; Starring Paul Burke {Captain Pratt}; Ivan Dixon {Sergeant Willis}; Also Starring Antoinette Bower {Anna Pratt}; Co-Starring Valentin De Vargas as Okahatan Denver Pyle as General Miles John Marley as Grey Beard; with Curt Conway as General Grierson John Duke as Running Dog Eddie Little Sky as Lean Bear Rockne Tarkington as Corporal Banks; and Iron Eyes Cody as Iron Eyes Earl Hammond as Captain Vernett Allen as Cook Davis Roberts as Trooper Lenny Geer as Man Naomi Perry as Screaming Woman Jacque Shelton as Captain Gibson
18	18	"The Night Raiders"	Philip Leacock	Story by : Alvin Sapinsley; Teleplay by : Alvin Sapinsley; Based on a play by Richard Stockton	February 14, 1964
STARRING Jack Klugman; Torin Thatcher; CO–STARRING James Westerfield Walter Burke Parley Baer; Narrator Russell Johnson: "John Brown of Osawatomie with two sons and sixteen friends seized the United States arsenal at Harpers Ferry, Virginia on the night of October sixteen, eighteen fifty nine and there are those who say the Civil War began that evening." "For to seize hostages and bring them along with their slaves. This was the keystone of the whole audacious scheme. The old man wanted some illustrious names to call attention to his crusade and this one had one of the most illustrious names in all America." "It was twelve o'clock. For an hour and a half, the arsenal had been in the undisputed possession of the old man. Not a shot had been fired, not a voice raised in alarm. Across the street from the arsenal, in the lobby of the Wager House, the desk clerk went about his duties, unaware the town had fallen into enemy hands. While at the other end of the combination hotel lobby and station waiting room, a dozing baggage master was equally unmindful. So was Patrick Higgins when he came to relieve the night watchman." "The first man to fall in John Brown's war to free the slaves was Shepherd Hayward, a free Negro. Other were not to be long in following." "By first light, Harpers Ferry was divided into two warring camps. The invaders held the arsenal and all of its works. The defenders had established their command post in the lobby of the Wager Hotel. In between, lay no man's land already stained with the blood of Shepherd Hayward." "Across the street, the citizenry of Harpers Ferry were getting ready to take their town back from the apparent madmen who had seized it during the night." "The fighting continued throughout the night and the bar in the Wager Hotel remained open, doing the best single night's business it had done since New Year's Eve five years before." "In the opposing camp, there was less merriment... less to be merry about... fewer to be merry. The old man had marched blithely into Harpers Ferry twenty four hours before, with an army of eighteen. Where were those eighteen a day and a night later? Dangerfield Newby... dead, Stewart Taylor... dead, John Kegi... dead, Leary... dead, Thompson... dead, Stevens, Anderson, Leeman... dead, dead, dead... and Oliver Brown... dying." "Watson Brown... dead... Oliver Brown... dead... Dauphin Thompson... dead... John Brown... captured." "At the request of Governor Wise, troops from the nearby Fort Lee were dispatched to Charles Town to guard against any attempt by Northern abolitionists to swoop down and rescue the prisoner." "The verdict was guilty... the sentence was death. The convicted man was asked if he had anything to say... Old Brown had something to say..." "And it was done... they hanged the old man on December second, eighteen fifty nine and that was the day his soul commenced its march from Charles Town, Virginia. It marched on and on and on through Fort Sumter, Gettysburg, Antietam, Appomattox. There are those who say it marches still."; Announcer: "Before previewing next week's Great Adventure, here is Gerald Gough, a teacher and member of the National Education Association, with a postscript on tonight's story." Gerald Gough: "Lincoln said that John Brown fancied himself commissioned by heaven. In this belief, Brown was not alone. The mob that murdered Elijah P. Lovejoy, an abolitionist editor in Illinois, believed that their cause was ordained by God, too. The congressman who assaulted sharp tongued Senator Charles Sumner right in the Senate after Sumner made a bitter anti-slavery speech, also believed that his violence was righteous. John Brown's act, as much as those of any man of his time, added fuel to the flames of controversy which led inevitably to the Civil War. He was a man whose insistence that only his way was right helped push other men to bitter extremes on both sides. John Brown at Harpers Ferry reminds us that he who takes the law into his own hands... destroys it."; Starring Jack Klugman {John Brown}; Torin Thatcher {Colonel Washington}; Co-Starring James Westerfield as Attorney Green Walter Burke as Higgins Parley Baer as Beckham; Featuring Russell Horton as Hoyt Les Brown, Jr. as Oliver Brown; Alan Baxter as Judge James Beck as Watson Brown Ashley Cowan as Clerk Joel Fluellen as Newby Nelson Olmsted as Harding John Wesley as Copeland Jordan Whitfield as Servant Ward Wood as Coppoc; Note: Nine years earlier, Jordan "Smoki" Whitfield, who plays a servant testifying at John Brown's trial, portrayed Dangerfield Newby (Joel Fluellen's role here) in the 1955 film about John Brown's raid, Seven Angry Men.
19	19	"Plague"	Joseph Sargent	Raphael Hayes	February 28, 1964
Starring Bob Cummings, John Dehner, Katharine Ross
20	20	"The Pathfinder"	Bernard Girard	Unknown	March 6, 1964
Starring Rip Torn, Channing Pollock, Carroll O'Connor
21	21	"The President Vanishes"	Robert Stevens	Unknown	March 13, 1964
Starring Barry Sullivan, Leif Erickson, Marion Ross
22	22	"The Henry Bergh Story"	James Sheldon	Unknown	March 20, 1964
Starring Brian Keith, Frank Aletter, Marion Ross, H. M. Wynant
23	23	"Kentucky's Bloody Ground"	Philip Leacock	Calvin Clements	April 3, 1964
Narrator Russell Johnson: "They knew nothing of this country west of the Alleghenies... these first settlers. The land had been remote as the African jungle... only a few men daring to penetrate... to explore... to finally emerge with stories of abundant game... of lush land which awaited only axes for clearing. One of these men was a frontier scout... forever challenged by the unknown... forever accepting that challenge. Into his hands these settlers were delivering their lives... their fortunes." "Under a grant to seek and settle new land, these frontiers people were prepared for hardships... their only known enemy, the land... the widely scattered small groups of Indians — a nuisance threat — rather than a problem. They could not have foretold a shot was to be fired at a far-off place called Lexington... that the very ground over which they were passing would be renamed by the Indians. It was soon to be called a dark and bloody ground."; STARRING Peter Graves; Andrew Duggan; David McCallum; Peggy McCay; CO–STARRING Judee Morton; AND Arthur Hunnicutt AS Simon Kenton "Probably no man was more well-known to the Kentucky Indian than Daniel Boone. For five years he had scouted the unknown wilderness west of the Alleghenies... and the Cherokee, the Shawnee, the Wyandot knew him as a fair man and admired him as a hunter without fear... but Boone also knew the Indian mind as probably no other... and in this summer of seventeen seventy-five, on the eve of the bloodiest Indian war in history, the hostile undercurrents were unmistakable. Boone was still unaware the British saw his settlement on the banks of the Kentucky as a menace to their northwest lines in the event of a rebellion. He was a man of simple thoughts, but of complex instincts. Logic pointed to a problem building in this new land... instincts guided him on to probe for an answer." "At no period in our frontier history was a man so tested against the wilderness... starting without clothing or weapons, Boone faced a hundred mile trek back to the settlement. He was racing against time... The Indian buildup... he had to tell the settlers of the Revolution in the east... that they were marked for massacre. But now, strong stockade walls alone would make the difference between living and dying." "Boonesboro, the first western outpost of the new colonies... and here, very shortly, a handful of people would sustain the longest and most brutally waged Indian siege in American history."; Announcer: "Before previewing next week's Great Adventure, here is Gerald Gough, a teacher and member of the National Education Association, with a postscript on tonight's story." Gerald Gough: "There was one notable difference between Daniel Boone and many of the other great frontiersmen of American history. Most of the frontiersmen were loners... men with a thirst for adventure that kept driving them further and further into the unknown west and away from civilization. But Daniel Boone was a family man. He saw in the frontier an opportunity to sink roots and build a home where his children could grow and prosper. he saw the promise of rich fruitful land and he was willing to fight for it. Ironically, it is recorded that one of his early ambitions had been to settle in Florida, but his wife didn't want to live there. Perhaps if Mrs. Boone hadn't felt so strongly, this chapter of American history might have turned out differently."; Announcer: "Next week, watch for the exciting conclusion of our story on The Great Adventure. "Boonesboro... Join Peter Graves, Andrew Duggan, Arthur Hunnicutt, David McCallum and other stars as they fight one of the bloodiest and most spectacular battles of America's early history. Next week on The Great Adventure."; Starring Peter Graves {Daniel Boone}; Andrew Duggan {Colonel Callaway}; David McCallum {Captain Hanning}; Peggy McCay {Mrs. Callaway}; Co-Starring Judee Morton {Jemima Boone}; and Arthur Hunnicutt AS Simon Kenton; Featuring Stuart Cooper as Flanders Callsway Laurie Mock as Frances Callaway Clive Clerk as Samuel Henderson Teddy Eccles as James Boone Richard Lupino as Lt. Brown Eddie Little Sky as Chief Blackfish Jose De Vega as Blackfish's son; Frances Karath as Elizabeth Callsway Iron Eyes Cody as Cherokee Chief Rodd Redwing as Indian Chief Jack Bighead as Lead Indian Russ Grieve as A Settler Elizabeth Perry as Dying Woman Peter Hale as Settler
24	24	"The Siege of Boonesborough"	Philip Leacock	Calvin Clements	April 10, 1964
Starring Peter Graves, David McCallum, Andrew Duggan
25	25	"Escape"	Robert Gist	Unknown	April 17, 1964
Starring Jack Warden, Fritz Weaver, Michael Constantine
26	26	"The Pirate and the Patriot"	Philip Leacock	Unknown	May 1, 1964
Starring Ricardo Montalban, Kent Smith, John Anderson, John McGiver
