= Aspinwall =

Aspinwall may refer to:

== People ==
- Aspinwall (surname), including a list of people with the name

== Places ==
- Aspinwall, Iowa, United States
- Aspinwall, Pennsylvania, United States
- Aspinwall Lake (Mahnomen County, Minnesota), a lake in Minnesota
- Colón, Panama (alternative or historical name)

== See also ==
- Aspinall (disambiguation)
