= William Aspinwall (disambiguation) =

William Aspinwall (1605–c. 1662) was a resident of the Massachusetts Bay Colony.

William Aspinwall may also refer to:

- William Aspinwall (minister) (fl. 1648–1662), nonconformist English minister
- William Aspinwall (physician) (1743–1823), American physician
- William Henry Aspinwall (1807–1875), American railroad businessman

== See also ==
- William Aspinall (disambiguation)
