= Angier =

Angier may refer to:

== People ==
- Bradford Angier (1910–1997), American author and survivalist
- Carole Angier (born 1943), English biographer
- John Angier (1605–1677), English nonconformist minister
- Milton Angier (1899–1967), American javelin thrower
- Natalie Angier (born 1958), American nonfiction writer and science journalist
- Nedom L. Angier (1814–1882), American politician, mayor of Atlanta, Georgia
- Samuel Angier (1639–1713), English nonconformist minister, nephew of John Angier
- Angier Biddle Duke (1915–1995), American ambassador and Chief of Protocol of the United States
- Angier March Perkins (1799–1881), American engineer

== Places ==
- Anyer, Indonesia, also spelled Angier, a town
- Angier, North Carolina, US, a town

== Fictional characters ==
- Rupert Angier, in the novel The Prestige (renamed Robert Angier in film version)
