= Aspinall =

Aspinall may refer to:

== People ==
- Aspinall (surname), including a list of people with the name

== Places ==
- Aspinall, West Virginia, United States
- The Aspinall Unit of the Colorado River Storage Project

== Organisations ==
- Crown London Aspinalls, private gambling club in London
- Lightbown Aspinall, English wallpaper company
- The Aspinall Foundation, British charity

== Other uses ==
- L&YR Class 2 (Aspinall), locomotive

== See also ==
- Aspinwall (disambiguation)
