= Richard Stockton =

Richard Stockton may refer to:

- Richard Stockton (Continental Congressman) (1730–1781), delegate to the Continental Congress from New Jersey
- Richard Stockton (senator) (1764–1828), United States senator from New Jersey and son of the New Jersey delegate to the Continental Congress
- Richard Stockton (playwright) (1932–1997), American playwright
- Dick Stockton (born 1942), American sportscaster, born Richard Edward Stokvis
- Dick Stockton (tennis) (born 1951), American tennis player
- Richard Stockton (Mississippi politician) (c. 1792–1827), Associate Justice of the Supreme Court of Mississippi

== See also ==
- Richard Stockton College, New Jersey, United States
