= William Aspinall (disambiguation) =

William Aspinall may refer to:

- William Aspinall (fl. 1960–1970), rugby league footballer
- William H. Aspinall (1942–2021), rugby league footballer

== See also ==
- William Aspinwall (disambiguation)
