= Astrological botany =

Astrological botany is based on the notion that if plants or seeds are to be used for medicinal purposes then their planting and collection must be carried out with regard to the positions of the planets and other heavenly bodies, which are at the heart of the disease process. For instance, herbs intended to be used on male patients should be gathered when the Sun and Moon are in one of the male signs of the zodiac such as Sagittarius or Aquarius, whereas those for the treatment of females should be gathered under a female sign such as Virgo. Astrological botany was often used in conjunction with the doctrine of signatures, which held that the physical form of a plant reflected its medicinal use.

In the words of Agnes Arber, England became "badly infected" with astrological botany during the 17th century, when its most "notorious" practitioner was Nicholas Culpeper.

== See also ==
- Medical astrology
- Nicholas Culpeper
