= Nicholas Culpeper =

English botanist and physician (1616–1654)

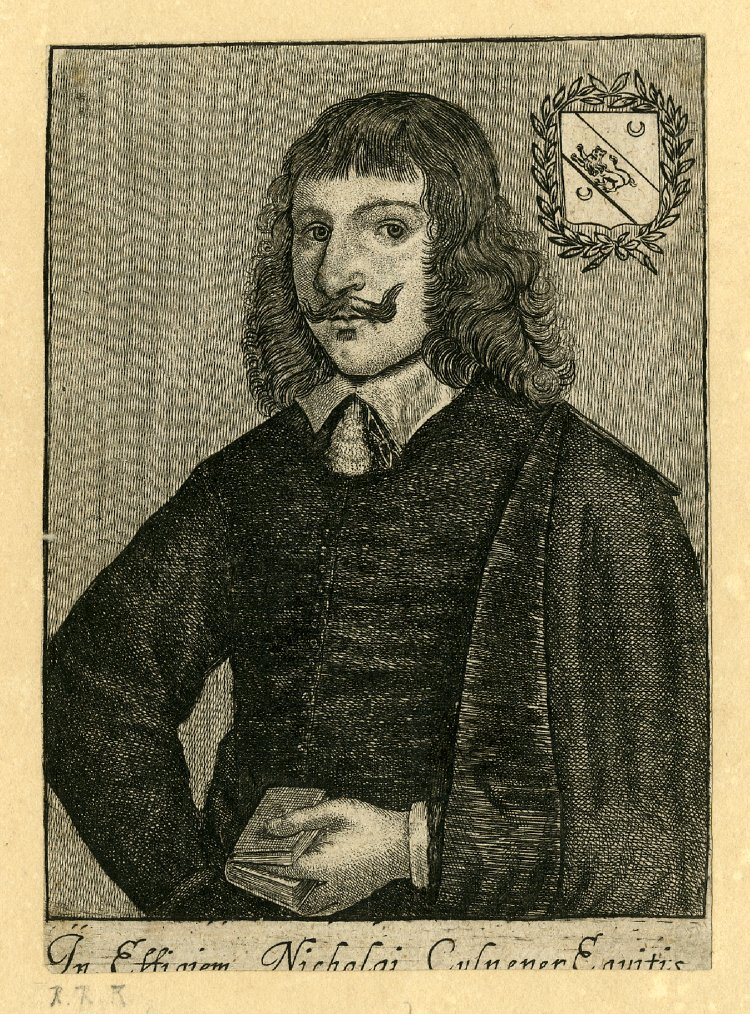
- Engraving by Richard Gaywood
- Born: 18 October 1616; Ockley, Surrey, England
- Died: 10 January 1654 (aged 37); Spitalfields, London, England
- Education: Cambridge University
- Known for: The English Physitian (Complete Herbal), 1652–1653
- Scientific career
- Fields: Botany; Herbalism; Medicine; Astrology

Nicholas Culpeper (18 October 1616 – 10 January 1654) was an English botanist, herbalist, physician and astrologer. His book The English Physitian (1652, later Complete Herbal, 1653 ff.) is a source of pharmaceutical and herbal lore of the time, and Astrological Judgement of Diseases from the Decumbiture of the Sick (1655) one of the most detailed works on medical astrology in Early Modern Europe. Culpeper catalogued hundreds of outdoor medicinal herbs. He scolded contemporaries for some of the methods they used in herbal medicine: "This not being pleasing, and less profitable to me, I consulted with my two brothers, Dr. Reason and Dr. Experience, and took a voyage to visit my mother Nature, by whose advice, together with the help of Dr. Diligence, I at last obtained my desire; and, being warned by Mr. Honesty, a stranger in our days, to publish it to the world, I have done it."

Culpeper came from a line of notabilities, including the courtier Thomas Culpeper, who was reputed to be a lover of Katherine Howard (also a distant relative, her mother was Joyce Culpeper), the fifth wife of Henry VIII.

== Biography ==
Culpeper was the son of Nicholas Culpeper (senior), a cleric. Shortly after his birth his father died and he was taken to Isfield, the home of his maternal grandfather, the Reverend William Attersoll, where he was brought up by his mother. Attersoll was an influence on the young boy's political and religious beliefs and taught him both Latin and Greek. As a boy Culpeper became interested in astronomy, astrology, time, his grandfather's collection of clocks, and medical texts in Attersoll's library. Meanwhile his grandmother introduced him to the world of medicinal plants and herbs. He would go on, throughout his life, spending time in the countryside cataloguing plants.

From the age of 16 he studied at Cambridge, but it is not known at which college, although his father studied at Queens', and his grandfather was a member of Jesus College. He was then apprenticed to an apothecary. After seven years his master absconded with the money paid for the indenture, and soon after, Culpeper's mother died of breast cancer.

In 1640, Culpeper married Alice Field, the 15-year-old heiress of a wealthy grain merchant, which allowed him to set up a pharmacy at the halfway house in Spitalfields, London, outside the authority of the City of London, at a time when medical facilities in London were at breaking point. Arguing that "no man deserved to starve to pay an insulting, insolent physician" and obtaining his herbal supplies from the nearby countryside, Culpeper could provide his services free of charge. This and a willingness to examine patients in person rather than simply examining their urine (in his view, "as much piss as the Thames might hold" did not help in diagnosis), Culpeper was extremely active, sometimes seeing as many as 40 patients in a morning. Using a combination of experience and astrology, he devoted himself to using herbs to treat his patients.

During the early months of the English Civil War, Culpeper was accused of witchcraft and the Society of Apothecaries tried to rein in his practice. Alienated and radicalised, he joined the London Trained bands in August 1643 under the command of Philip Skippon and fought at the First Battle of Newbury, where he carried out battlefield surgery. He was taken back to London after sustaining a serious chest injury from a bullet, from which he never fully recovered. There he cooperated with the Republican astrologer William Lilly on A Prophesy of the White King, which predicted the King's death. Culpeper died of tuberculosis in London on 10 January 1654 at the age of 37 and was buried in New Churchyard, Bethlem. Only one of his seven children, Mary, reached adulthood. He was survived by his wife, Alice, who married the astrologer John Heydon in 1656. The date of her death is uncertain: some sources say 1659, but others that she was licensed as a midwife in 1665.

== Political beliefs ==
Influenced during his apprenticeship by the radical preacher John Goodwin, who said no authority was above question, Culpeper became a radical republican and opposed the "closed shop" of medicine enforced by censors of the College of Physicians. In his youth, Culpeper translated medical and herbal texts for his master, such as the London Pharmacopaeia from Latin. During the political turmoil of the English Civil War, the College of Physicians was unable to enforce its ban on the publication of medical texts, and Culpeper deliberately chose to publish his translations in vernacular English as self-help medical guides for use by the poor, who could not afford to consult physicians. He followed them up with a manual on childbirth and with his main work, The English Physitian, which was deliberately sold cheaply. It became available also in colonial America and has been in print continually since the 17th century.

Culpeper saw medicine as a public asset, not a commercial secret, and the prices physicians charged as too high compared with the cheap, universal availability of nature's medicine. He felt the use of Latin and the high fees charged by doctors, lawyers and priests worked to deprive the public of power and freedom.

Three kinds of people mainly disease the people – priests, physicians and lawyers – priests disease matters belonging to their souls, physicians disease matters belonging to their bodies, and lawyers disease matters belonging to their estate.

Culpeper was a radical in his time, angering his fellow physicians by condemning their greed, unwillingness to stray from Galen and use of harmful practices such as toxic remedies and bloodletting. The Society of Apothecaries were similarly incensed by the way he suggested cheap herbal remedies, as opposed to their expensive concoctions.

== Philosophy of herbalism ==
Culpeper attempted to make medical treatments more accessible to lay persons by educating them about maintaining their health. Ultimately his ambition was to reform the system of medicine by questioning traditional methods and knowledge and exploring new solutions for ill health. The systematisation of the use of herbals by Culpeper was a key development in the evolution of modern pharmaceuticals, most of which originally had herbal origins.

Culpeper's emphasis on reason rather than tradition is reflected in the introduction to his Complete Herbal. He was one of the best-known astrological botanists of his day, pairing the plants and diseases with planetary influences, countering illnesses with nostrums that were paired with an opposing planetary influence. Combining remedial care with Galenic humoral philosophy and questionable astrology, he forged a strangely workable system of medicine; combined with his "Singles" forceful commentaries, Culpeper was a widely read source for medical treatment in his time.

Though widely read his reputation was quite mixed. Eleanour Sinclair Rohde wrote of him, "One cannot help suspecting that Culpeper knew perfectly well what nonsense he was talking, but that he also realised how remunerative such nonsense was and how much is customers were impressed by it." Similarly other modern writers assert that even in his own time he was regarded as, "something of a fraud" or a quack.

Analysis has shown that more than 90% of the botanical entries in The English Physitian were derived, if not copied outright, from apothecary John Parkinson's Theatrum Botanicum of 1640. Parkinson's folio was massive, lavishly illustrated, and described over 3800 plants from around Europe. Culpeper's streamlining of the content involved eschewing illustrations, narrowing the focus to only English herbs, and omitting any non-medical uses of said plants, such as in animal husbandry or domestic chores. This smaller scope allowed Culpeper's book to be sold for a small fraction of the price, and resulted in much wider circulation. This flagrant "borrowing" did not escape notice at the time; one fellow apothecary published a 21-page critique including the assertion that "Culpeper's writings are either only other men's writings which he hath translated into English or collections of other men's works which he hath deformed".

== Legacy ==
Culpeper's translations and approach to using herbals have had an extensive impact on medicine in early North American colonies, and even modern medications. Culpeper was one of the first to translate from Latin documents discussing medicinal plants found in the Americas and colonists introduced medicinal plants from the Europe to the New World because they were featured in herbals like Culpeper's. Culpeper described the medical use of the foxglove, the botanical precursor to digitalis, used to treat heart conditions. His influence is demonstrated by the existence of a chain of "Culpeper" herb and spice shops in Canada, North America and beyond, and by the continued popularity of his remedies among New Age and alternative holistic medicine practitioners.

Nicholas is featured as the title protagonist in Rudyard Kipling's story "Doctor of Medicine", part of his Puck of Pook's Hill anthology.

== Excerpts from The English Physitian ==
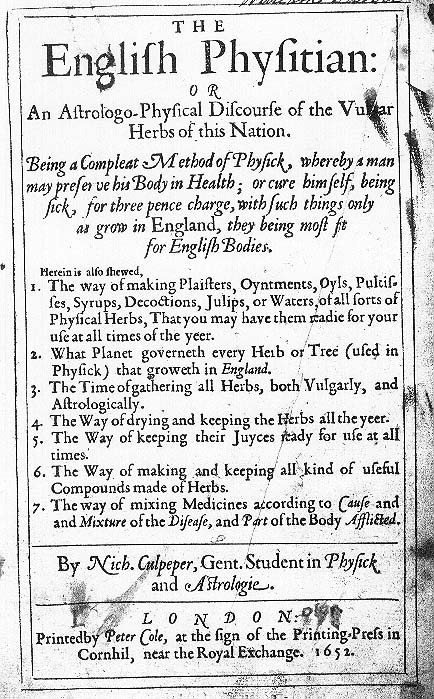
The title page of The English Physitian

Some examples of herbs, their claimed uses and preparations, as set out in The English Physitian.

- Anemone, as a juice applied externally to clean ulcerations, infections and cure leprosy; or inhaled to clear the nostrils
- Bedstraw, boiled in oil and applied externally as a stimulant, or consumed as an aphrodisiac; also applied raw externally to stimulate clotting
- Burdock, crushed and mixed with salt, as a treatment for dog bites; taken orally for flatulence, as an analgesic for tooth pain, and to strengthen the back
- Cottonweed, boiled in lye as a treatment for head lice or infestations in cloth or clothing; inhaled for headaches and coughing
- Dittany, as an abortifacient, to induce labour; as a treatment for poisoned weapons, and to draw out splinters and broken bones; the smell is said to drive away "venomous beasts". (One species of dittany, Dictamnus albus, is now known to contain alkaloids, limonoid triterpenoids, flavonoids, sesquiterpenoids, coumarins, and phenylpropane)
- Fleabane, for bites from "venomous beasts", and its smoke for killing gnats and fleas; but dangerous to pregnant women
- Hellebore, causes sneezing if ground and inhaled; for killing rodents if mixed with food. (Hellebore is now known to contain poisonous alkaloids: cardiac glycosides in the roots and ranunculin and protoanemonin, especially in the leaves and sap.)
- Mugwort, for inducing labour, assisting in birth and afterbirth, and easing labour pains
- Pennyroyal, for strengthening the backs of women, assisting with vertigo, and helping expel gas. (The active constituent of pennyroyal is now known to be pulegone.)
- Savory, for helping expel gas, and mixed with peas and beans for this reason
- Wood Betony, for "falling sickness" and headaches, anti-anoretic, "helps sour belchings", cramps, convulsions, bruises, afterbirth, gout, and killing worms

== Partial list of works ==
- A Physical Directory, or a Translation of the London Directory (1649) – translation of the Pharmacopoeia Londonesis of the Royal College of Physicians.
- Directory for Midwives (1651)
- Semeiotics Uranica, or (An Astrological Judgement of Diseases) (1651)
- Catastrophe Magnatum or (The Fall of Monarchy) (1652)
- The English Physitian (1652), later entitled The Complete Herbal
- Astrological Judgement of Diseases from the Decumbiture of the Sick (1655)
- A Treatise on Aurum Potabile (1656): This is certainly not by Nicholas Culpeper and lacks his style of writing. It is a confusing and repetitious work by John Heydon.
- Culpeper's School of Physick (1659): the last of his genuine writings, albeit fragments; includes an important 15-page biography signed "W.R."

== See also ==
- Alternative medicine
- Herbalism
- Medical astrology
- History of science
- Medication
- Pharmacognosy
- Astrological botany
- Astrology
- List of plants in The English Physitian (1652 book)
