= Asbjørnsen =

Asbjørnsen is a Norwegian surname. Notable people with the surname include:

- Kristin Asbjørnsen (born 1971), Norwegian jazz singer
- Øyvind Asbjørnsen (born 1963), Norwegian film producer
- Peter Christen Asbjørnsen (1812–1855), Norwegian writer
- Sigvald Asbjørnsen (1867–1954), Norwegian-born American sculptor

== See also ==
- Battleships Asbjørnsen and Moe, fictional ships
- Aspinwall (surname)
