= William Aspinwall (physician) =

American physician

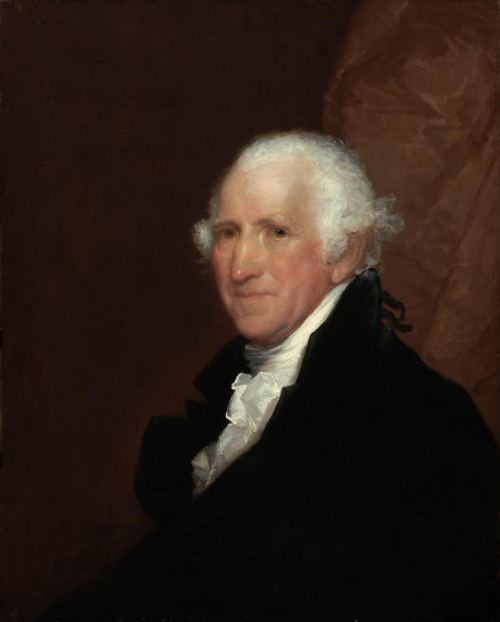
- portrait by Gilbert Stuart
- Born: May 23, 1743; Brookline
- Died: April 16, 1823 (aged 79); Brookline
- Resting place: Old Burying Ground
- Alma mater: Harvard College; Pennsylvania Hospital
- Occupation: Medical doctor, politician
- Parent(s): Thomas Aspinwall; Joanna Aspinwall
- Position held: member of the Massachusetts House of Representatives, member of the State Senate of Massachusetts

William Aspinwall (May 23, 1743 – April 16, 1823) was an American medical doctor who was an early practitioner of smallpox inoculation. He was also a Massachusetts state politician.

William Aspinwall was born in Brookline, Massachusetts, May 23, 1743. His ancestor, Peter, one of the immigrants from England, settled in Dorchester, Massachusetts, in 1630 and moved to Brookline about 1650. Peter's farm in Brookline was the region about Aspinwall Avenue. William, the sole survivor of three generations, was born in the old house situated in later years on Aspinwall Avenue near St. Paul's Church. It was built by Peter in 1660 and was torn down in 1891.

Dr. Aspinwall was fitted for college by the Rev. Amos Adams, a minister of Roxbury, and graduated from Harvard College in 1764. He studied medicine with Dr. Benjamin Gale, of Killingsworth, Connecticut, completing his medical education in the Pennsylvania Hospital, Philadelphia, where he spent seven months in study under Dr. William Shippen, who granted him a certificate of proficiency dated May 27, 1769.

He settled in practice in his native town. On the breaking out of the American Revolution he was induced by his friend and kinsman, Dr. Joseph Warren, to enter the medical department of the provincial army, although his inclinations led him in the direction of fighting in the ranks. In the beginning he followed his bent and as a volunteer at the Battle of Lexington conducted himself with distinction, bearing from the field the body of the commander of the Brookline Company, Isaac Gardner, father of his future wife. Receiving the appointment of surgeon to Gen. Heath's brigade and later deputy director to the army hospital in Jamaica Plain, Massachusetts, he rendered valuable service during the war.

After the death of Zabdiel Boylston, the first inoculator for smallpox in America, Dr. Aspinwall took up the business of inoculation and practiced it extensively in a licensed private hospital in Brookline. On the introduction of vaccination he was present at one of Dr. Benjamin Waterhouse's demonstrations, and becoming convinced of the superiority of vaccination gave up inoculation, although at a great pecuniary loss to himself. "This new inoculation will take from me a handsome annual income, yet, as a man of humanity, I rejoice in it," said he, in a letter to Dr. Waterhouse.

For forty-five years he conducted a very large practice, most of the time going his rounds on horseback, and often covering forty miles in a day.

He lost one eye by an accident in his youth, and late in life was afflicted by a cataract in the remaining one. Dr. Nathan Smith attempted unsuccessfully to remove the cataract, therefore his last years were passed in darkness. He died in the house which he built on Aspinwall Hill, April 16, 1823, of "natural decay," at the age of 79.

He was elected a fellow of the Massachusetts Medical Society in 1812, and Harvard College conferred on him the honorary M. D. in 1808.

He married Susanna Gardner in 1776, and they had seven children.

Gilbert Stuart painted his portrait, which was in the possession of his son-in-law, Lewis Tappan, a noted New York abolitionist, at the time when pro-slavery rioters broke into his home in 1834. The portrait so much resembled George Washington that the mob, thinking it a picture of the father of his country, spared it.

The following offices were held by him during his lifetime: Town treasurer, warden, surveyor, State representative, and senator. While studying medicine in 1769 he wrote a sketch of his ancestors, which has been preserved by his descendants. William Aspinwall died on 16 April 1823 in Brookline.
