= John Angier =

English nonconformist minister

John Angier (1605–1677) was an English nonconformist minister.

== Early life ==
Angier was from Dedham, in Essex, where he was baptised 8 October 1605. At his own desire was brought up to be a preacher. At the age of twelve he was a grave child; but during his stay at Cambridge University as an undergraduate of Emmanuel College 'he fell off to vain company and loose practices.' He took his B.A. degree in 1625/6. His father subsequently died while he was away from home, and whilst staying at his mother's house he came under the influence of John Rogers, of Dedham, one of the most forceful of the puritan preachers.

Angier lived for some time with Rogers, and afterwards with a Mr. Witham. He is next found boarding, studying, and sometimes preaching, at the house of John Cotton, of Boston, Lincolnshire, which was frequented by puritan ministers. Here he met Ellen Winstanley, a native of Wigan, the niece of Mrs. Cotton, and married her at Boston church 16 April 1628. After the birth of his first son he planned with other ministers to go to New England; but he made a journey into Lancashire to his wife's relations. He preached a sermon at Bolton, and one of the hearers made him promise to preach at Ringley chapel. In spite of his fainting in the pulpit on this occasion, the Ringley people were determined to have Angier as their pastor, and in September 1630 he accepted their call, and settled with them. Ecclesiastically his case was unusual. By the interest of Cotton he was ordained by Lewis Bayly, bishop of Bangor, but without subscription; and he remained a nonconformist to the Anglican ceremonies to the end of his days.

== Early career ==
Angier's diocesan was John Bridgeman, bishop of Chester, who dealt with him mildly and was rebuked by William Laud. He was, however, suspended from Ringley after about eighteen months' service. Denton chapelry was at this time vacant by the suspension of its puritan minister, and the choice of the people was directed towards Angier, who settled with them in 1632, and remained their pastor, with some interruptions caused by the troubles of the time, for more than forty-five years. He was twice excommunicated, and his congregation often were disturbed by the ruling powers. It was thought that he had some hand in a book reflecting on Laud, which was discovered at Stockport; but in his diary he professed his innocence of it. Angier escaped serious persecution.

When the episcopal constitution of the church was abolished, his former congregation at Ringley tried to recover him. The contest between the two congregations was referred to the judgement of ministers, who decided that Angier should stay in his latest settlement. When the Presbyterian form of church government was established in Lancashire, he often acted as moderator of the classis, and attended the provincial assembly, and had ruling elders in his own congregation. His presbyterianism was moderate, and he incurred some blame for the breadth of his views as to church discipline.

== Under the Commonwealth ==
Angier signed the document known as the 'Harmonious Consent', issued in 1648, in which the Presbyterian ministers denounced the notion of 'an universal toleration of all the pernicious errors, blasphemous and heretical doctrines broached in these times.'

Angier testified against the execution of Charles I, and refused to sign the engagement to be true to the commonwealth of England as established without king or house of lords. On this account he was, with other ministers, taken prisoner to Liverpool; the plague was raging there, and they were moved to Ormskirk. The time was passed in a discussion about prayer, and the diversity of opinion led them to select one of their number to treat the matter more fully. In this prison-house talk originated the treatise on prayer of Edward Gee of Eccleston.

Many cases of conscience were propounded to Angier, whose judgment was so greatly relied upon, that the ill-natured styled him the 'idol of Lancashire.' He had also a reputation as a healer of quarrels. He preached twice on Sunday, and often on week days, praying seven times daily, fasting and travelling frequently.

== Later life ==
Angier took no overt part in the Cheshire rising of 1659, and after the Act of Uniformity 1662 he escaped the persecution that fell on most of the nonconformists. Warrants were indeed issued against him; but those who had to execute them acknowledged that they would not see him for a hundred pounds. Something, no doubt, was due to the influence of his brother-in-law, Mosley of Ancoats, whose mother and sister stayed with Angier for many years.

When the Oxford Act came into operation, he moved into Cheshire; but an attack of gout came on, and saying to Oliver Heywood, 'Come, son, let us trust God and go home,' he returned to Denton. The neighbouring justices said, 'He is an old man, and will not live long; let us not trouble him.' John Wilkins, the new bishop of Chester, frequently inquired after his health. Angier admitted Heywood to the communion at Denton after his excommunication.

John Angier died in prayer, after several days' illness, 1 September 1677, and was buried at Denton, his funeral being attended by a great concourse of people.

== Writings ==
The only work bearing John Angier's name is An Helpe to Better Hearts for Better Times, London, 1647, consisting of sermons preached in 1638. Another work has been attributed to him, and Robert Halley holds it to be his, a tract. Its content relates to the incidents of the civil war in Lancashire.

== Family ==
His first wife, a pious and sickly woman, died in December 1642, leaving him a son and two daughters. By her deathbed suggestion Angier, a year later, married Margaret Mosley, of Ancoats, whose family were of great local consideration, and held the lordship of the manor of Manchester. They were married in 1643 'very publicly in Manchester church, in the heat of the wars, which was noticed as an act of faith in them both.' She died in 1675.

Angier's own daughter, by his desire, was betrothed to Oliver Heywood, a month before their marriage in Denton chapel in 1655, and after the final ceremony he entertained about a hundred guests at his table, for he said he loved to have a marriage like a marriage. Heywood later published his father-in-law’s biography.

John Angier's son, also named John, was born at Boston in 1629, and, like his father, went to Emmanuel College, Cambridge. His studies, however, were so unsatisfactory that, when in 1657 he applied for ordination, 'he was approved for parts and ability,' but it was thought fitting that he should make public acknowledgment of the errors of his youth. He was appointed to Ringley Chapel, but moved to Lincolnshire, where he was resident at the time of his father's death. He married Hannah Aspinall, daughter of William Aspinall; she died in 1699.

Samuel Angier, presbyterian minister, was nephew of John Angier the elder.

== Notes ==
Attribution

This article incorporates text from a publication now in the public domain: "Angier, John". Dictionary of National Biography. London: Smith, Elder & Co. 1885–1900.
