= Aspinwall Lake (Mahnomen County, Minnesota) =

Lake in the state of Minnesota, United States

- Location within Minnesota
- Location: Mahnomen County, Minnesota
- Coordinates: 47°22′52″N 95°49′16″W
- Type: Lake
- Surface elevation: 1,266 feet (386 m)

Aspinwall Lake is a lake located in Mahnomen County, in the U.S. state of Minnesota.

Aspinwall Lake was named after Henry Aspinwall, a pioneer who settled along its shores.

== See also ==
- List of lakes in Minnesota
