= Richard Stockton (playwright) =

American dramatist

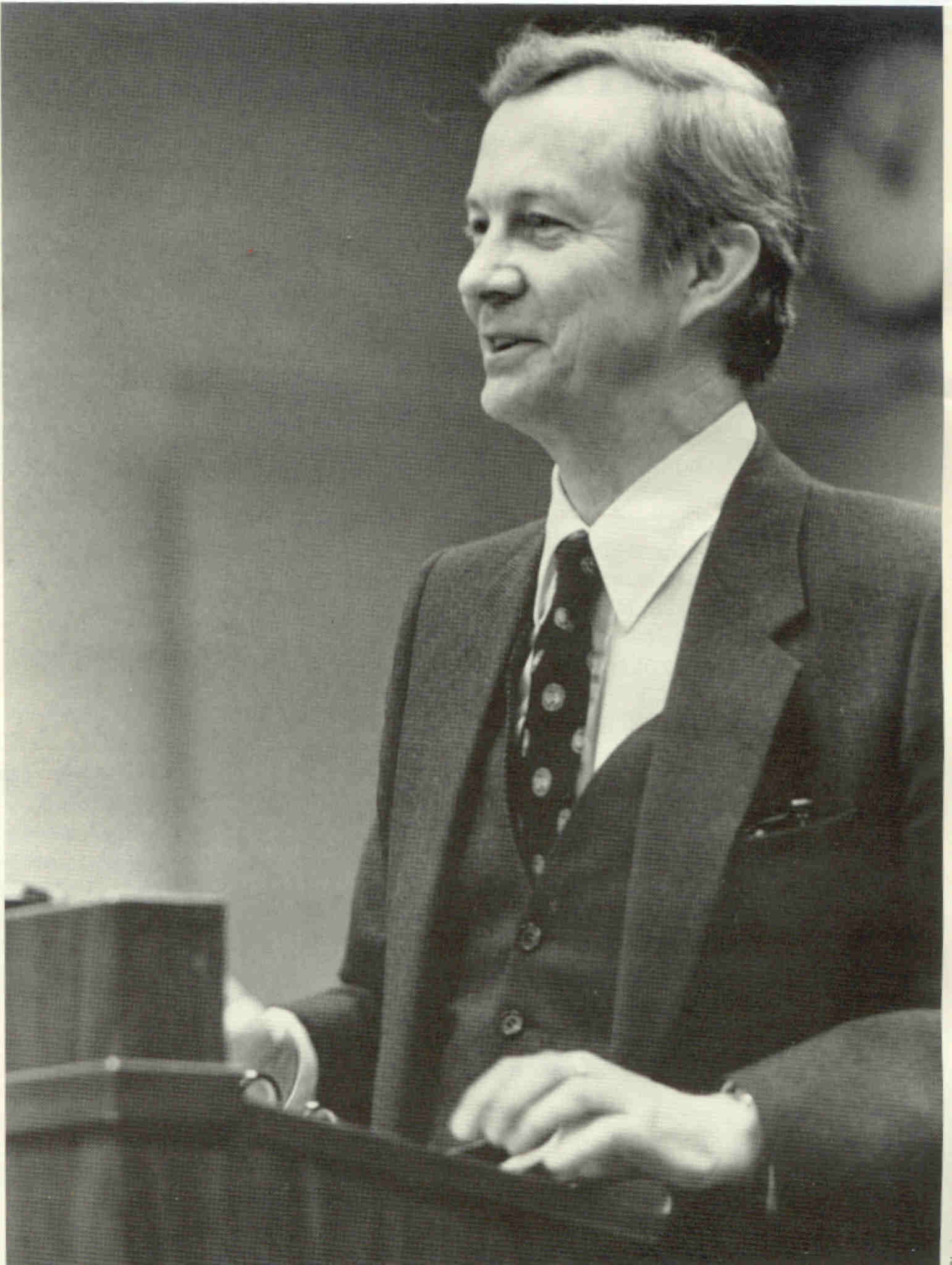
Richard Stockton giving a speech

Richard Franklin Stockton (Akron, Ohio February 3, 1932 – April 5, 1997) was an American playwright. He was the first American Playwright to receive a world premiere at the Abbey Theatre, Ireland’s National Theatre, for his play Prisoner of the Crown, co-produced by Sir Alfred Drake. The play received its American premiere by the Repertory Company of the Virginia Museum Theater, under the title The Royal Rape of Ruari Macasmunde, with Keith Fowler in the title role and under Alfred Drake's direction. The play dramatizes the jury deliberations in the treason trial of Roger Casement.

He received his bachelor's degree at Akron University in 1954, followed by a master's degree in playwriting at UCLA in 1960 and a playwriting fellowship at the State University of Iowa.

He was a speech writer for various CEOs: Chase Manhattan Bank, J. P. Morgan, City Bank and Exxon. Notably David Rockefeller of Chase Manhattan Bank in 1972.

He is survived by his wife, Irene Schaeffer Stockton, three children: David Stockton, Jessica Stockton Clancy and Carlisle Stockton. Followed by five grandchildren: Gray, Avalon, and Talis Stockton; and Maya and Keira Clancy.

== Works ==
=== Plays ===
- Prisoner of the Crown, Abbey Theatre, Dublin, Ireland, co-produced by Sir Alfred Drake in 1972. ISBN 978-0-8222-2352-8.
- Prisoner of the Crown (as The Royal Rape of Ruari Macasmunde), the American premiere, directed by Alfred Drake, at the Virginia Museum Theater in 1972.
- Prisoner of the Crown, The Milwaukee Repertory Theater, directed by Nagle Jackson in 1973;
- Prisoner of the Crown, The Irish Repertory Theatre in New York directed by Ciaran O'Reilly in 2008.
- Speak of the Devil, produced in New York City: at the Lambs Theatre in 1972 under the title One World at a Time
- Speak of the Devil produced in New York City at The Chernuchin under the title Royal Bob in 1983 starring Larry Bryggman
- Speak of the Devil staged reading at The Players in New York City on 01/31/11. Directed by Robert Kalfin.
- Love Among the Platypi (Bucks County Playhouse)
- Till The Day Break (Old Salem Corporation)
- The Trial of Captain John Brown, (Louisville Little Theatre)
- The House Shall Tremble (UCLA)
- The Weed Bouquet (The Playwrights Showcase in New Orleans)
- The Litter of Flowers (The Little Theatre of Jacksonville).
- Seven Short Plays (UCLA and The Tokyo English Theatre).

=== Books for musical adaptations of classics ===
- The Adventures of Tom Sawyer (Town Hall)
- The Prince and The Pauper
- Androcles and The Lion, produced by The National Theatre Company and toured nationally by Fran and Barry Weissler.

Numerous television dramas for CBS, The Great Adventure, CBC Television, and The U.S. Steel Hour, starring James Whitmore, Anne Baxter, Jeanne Crain, Mona Freeman, Barry Sullivan, and Jack Klugman. A dozen radio plays produced internationally for the BBC, CBC Television, and Radio New Zealand.

== Awards ==
Stockton received the Samuel Goldwyn Creative Writing Award for The House Shall Tremble. He also received first place awards in the Samuel French National Playwriting Competition, the Bellows Prize For Drama, and The Alden Award of the Dramatists Alliance.
