= Benjamin Waterhouse =

American physician (1754–1846)

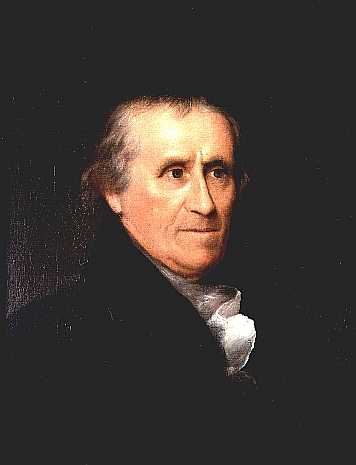
- Waterhouse portrait by Rembrandt Peale from 1833
- Born: March 4, 1754; Newport, Colony of Rhode Island
- Died: October 2, 1846 (aged 92); Cambridge, Massachusetts, United States

Academic background
- Education: University of Edinburgh Medical School; Leiden University
- Thesis: Dissertatio medica De sympathia partium corporis humani, ejusque, in explicandis et curandis morbis necessaria consideratione

Benjamin Waterhouse (March 4, 1754 – October 2, 1846) was a medical doctor, co-founder and professor of Harvard Medical School. He is most well known for being the first doctor to test the smallpox vaccine in the United States, which he carried out on his own family.

== Biography ==
=== Early life ===
Waterhouse was born into a Quaker family, although he never adopted the religion as his own. His parents were Timothy Waterhouse, a chair maker who also served on the Governor's Council, and Hannah Waterhouse. Born and raised in Rhode Island, his medical career began at age 16, when he apprenticed for a doctor in his hometown. At age 21, he left the United States to study medicine in Europe at several notable institutions, such as with Dr. John Fothergill in London, England. He was also educated in Edinburgh at the University of Edinburgh Medical School. He matriculated on October 28, 1778, at Leiden University in The Netherlands and received at the same University his medical degree April 19, 1780. The title description of his thesis is Dissertatio medica De sympathia partium corporis humani, ejusque, in explicandis et curandis morbis necessaria consideratione. This translates to "On the sympathy of the parts of the human body and its necessary consideration in explaining and treating diseases." The thesis was dedicated to John Fothergill, M.D., "inspirer of my studies."

While living in the Netherlands, Waterhouse roomed with future US President John Adams.

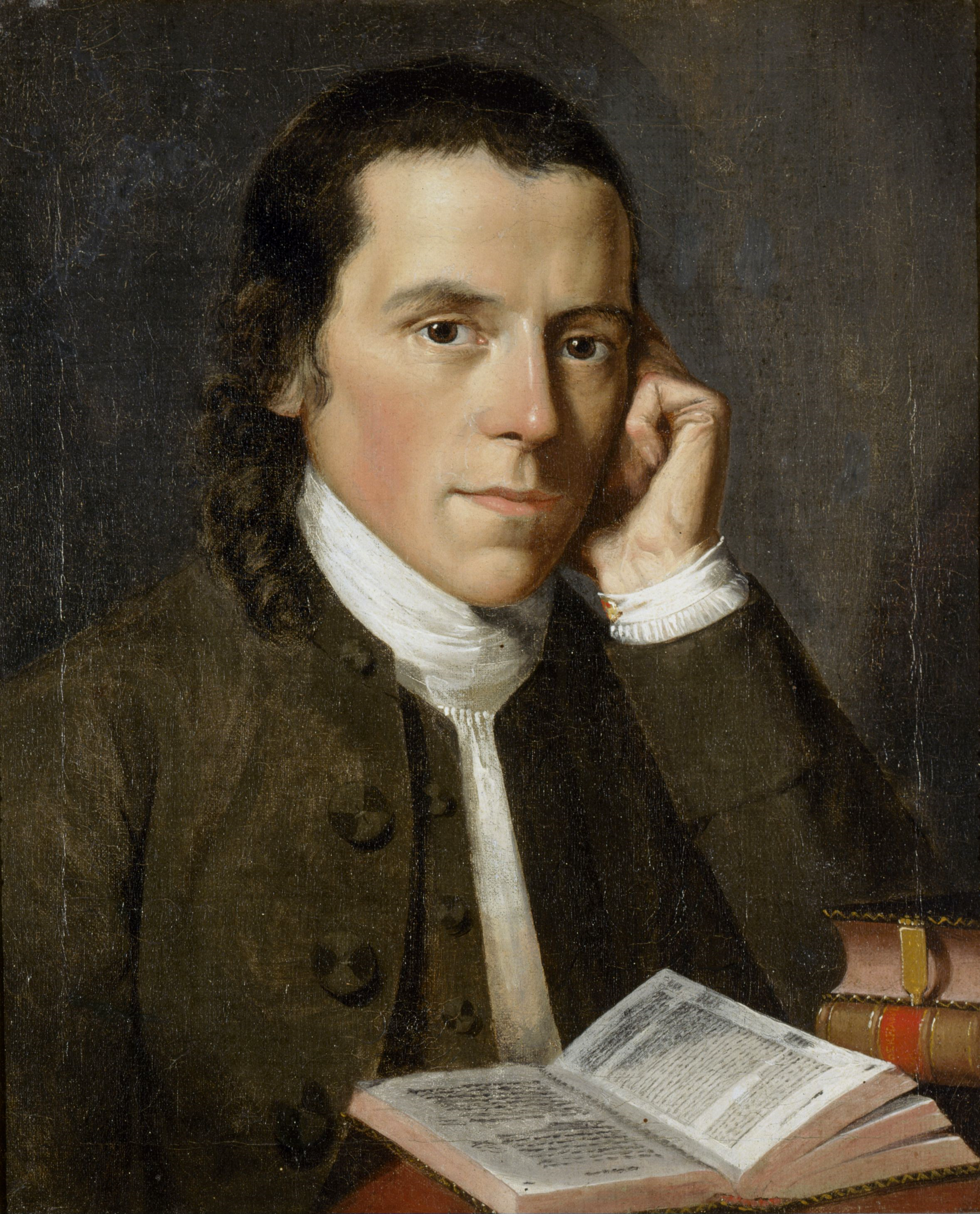
Portrait of Waterhouse by Gilbert Stuart, 1775

=== Medical career ===
After returning to the United States in 1782, Waterhouse joined the faculty of the new medical school at Harvard as one of three professors, including John Warren and Aaron Dexter, in the area of Theory and Practice of Physic. He was also elected that same year as a Fellow at Rhode Island College (now Brown University), where he taught natural history. He was elected a Fellow of the American Academy of Arts and Sciences in 1795. In 1814, Waterhouse resigned his Harvard professorship after opposing a plan to establish the Medical School in Boston and attempting to found a rival medical school.

==== Smallpox vaccine ====
Waterhouse first wrote to then-President John Adams, his former roommate, hoping to spread the word about cowpox vaccinations preventing smallpox. When he found President Adams unresponsive, he wrote a letter to Vice President Thomas Jefferson: "A prospect of exterminating the smallpox."

Jefferson replied with a letter dated Christmas Day, 1800, and soon offered his support. Once Jefferson became President the following year, Waterhouse introduced Edward Jenner's method of cowpox vaccination in the United States. He attempted to maintain a monopoly over the cowpox vaccine, for both financial reasons and to protect the vaccine from incompetent or fraudulent physicians. Waterhouse made the first vaccinations in the United States on four of his children. He commissioned a controlled experiment at the Boston Board of Health in which 19 vaccinated and 2 unvaccinated boys were exposed to the smallpox virus. The vaccinated boys demonstrated immunity, and both unvaccinated boys succumbed to the disease.

=== Personal life ===
In 1788, he married Elizabeth Oliver, with whom he had six children. She died in childbirth in 1815. In 1819, he married Louisa Lee; no children resulted from this marriage.

Waterhouse was a prickly character, with a tendency to become involved in controversy.

=== Military service ===
Waterhouse had a commission in the U.S. Army during the War of 1812 in the days before military physicians were accorded rank. Waterhouse was assigned to a Navy Frigate that was eventually captured by the Royal Navy. Waterhouse along with the surviving crew members was held in a British prison ship under harsh conditions until the end of the war. After he was repatriated to the United States, Waterhouse published a critical account of the British POW system. Choosing to remain in the military after the war, Waterhouse held the position of "Hospital Surgeon", in 1818 he was promoted to "Post Surgeon", and in 1821 he was honorably discharged.

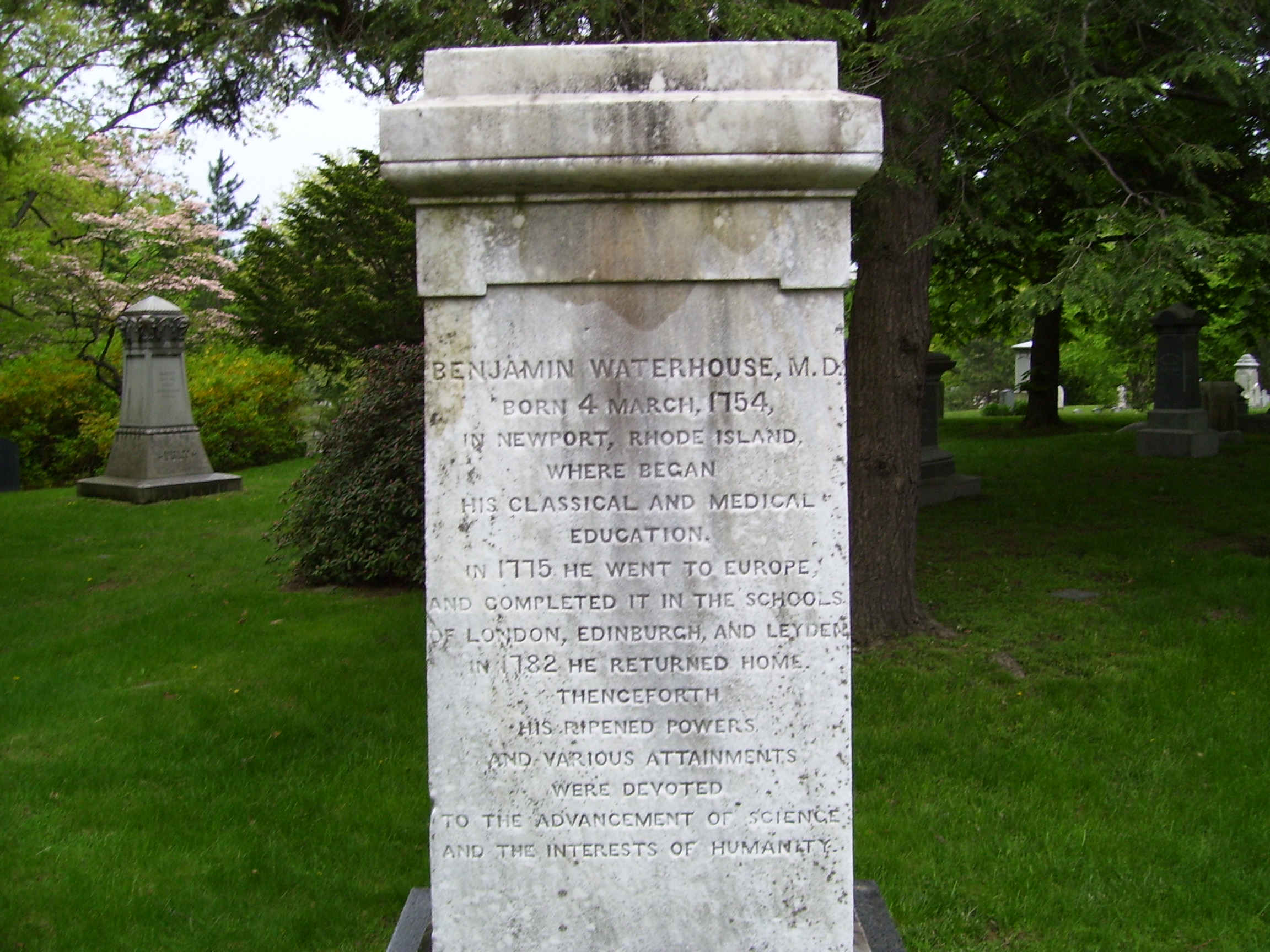
Waterhouse's grave in Mount Auburn Cemetery

=== Final years and death ===
Throughout the 1820s, Waterhouse was a strong supporter of Samuel Thomson's medical system. He died in his home in Cambridge on October 6, 1846, and was survived by his wife Louisa. He is interred at Mount Auburn Cemetery, where Louisa erected a small monument in his honor.

== Legacy ==
- Waterhouse was elected to the American Philosophical Society in 1791.
- Waterhouse is the subject of a 2006 biography entitled Dr. Benjamin Waterhouse: A Life in Medicine and Public Service (1754—1846) by Philip Cash.
- His portrait hangs at the Harvard Medical School and his house on Waterhouse Street near Cambridge Common bears a plaque commemorating his introduction of the smallpox vaccine in the United States.
- The Countway Medical Library has a silver watch inscribed to Waterhouse by Edward Jenner.
- Waterhouse's work with the smallpox vaccine was dramatized in a 1964 episode of the historical anthology series The Great Adventure. He was portrayed by Robert Cummings.

== Works ==
- A Synopsis of a Course on the Theory and Practice of Medicine. In Four Parts (1786)
- The Rise, Progress, and Present State of Medicine (1792)
- A Prospect of Exterminating the Small Pox, Part I (1800), Part II (1802)
- Cautions to Young Persons Concerning Health...Showing the Evil Tendency of the Use of Tobacco...with Observations on the Use of Ardent and Vinous Spirits (1805)
- Information Respecting the Origin, Progress, and Efficacy of the Kine Pock Inoculation (1810)
- The Botanist, Being the Botanical Part of a Course of Lectures on Natural History...Together with a Discourse on the Principles of Vitality (1811)
