= Walter Aspinall =

English cricketer

Walter Aspinall (24 March 1858 – unknown) was an English cricketer, who played three games of first-class cricket, two of them for Yorkshire County Cricket Club in 1880. A specialist wicket-keeper, he found little success as a right-handed batsman, scoring just 19 runs in four innings with a best of 14.

Aspinall was born in Elland, Yorkshire. Picked for his first match against Surrey at the Oval in August 1880, Aspinall made his highest first-class score in his first knock from the lowly position of number 10, as Yorkshire compiled thanks to skipper George Ulyett's 141. Surrey were dismissed for 176 and 99, with Aspinall taking a catch in the second innings, to win by an innings and 123 runs.

Aspinall retained his place for the next match, against Middlesex County Cricket Club at Bramall Lane. Runs eluded him as Yorkshire crashed to a comprehensive six wicket defeat, and he failed to take a catch or effect a stumping. Yorkshire never selected him again.

He had also appeared for Halifax, in a non first-class game against 'The Gentlemen of Canada', in a two-day game on 28 and 29 June 1880. He found no greater form at the crease in this game, being bowled by Wright for three in Halifax's 114, and again falling to the same bowler in the same manner, for a duck second time around. Despite his failures at number 9 in the order, Halifax managed to draw the game.

His final first-class appearance was for the 'Under 30 XI', against W.G. Grace's 'Over 30 XI', at Lord's at the end of May 1882. Aspinall once again kept wicket, and although he scored just three runs in his only innings, his team enjoyed a comprehensive ten wicket win over their elders. Aspinall showed his skills behind the timbers, by taking four catches on his final first-class appearance.
