= William Attersoll =

English puritan divine and author

William Attersoll (died 1640), was an English puritan divine and author.

== Education ==
Attersoll was apparently for a time a member of Jesus College, Cambridge, when, as he writes in his "Historie of Balak" (1610), his patron of later years, Sir Henry Fanshaw, was "a chiefe and choise ornament" there. But in that case he must have early passed from it; for he proceeded A.B. 1582 at Clare Hall, and A.M. 1586 at Peterhouse. Attersoll succeeded William Bishoppe in the living of Isfield, in Sussex, soon after 18 January 1599 – 1600, the date of Bishoppe's burial.

== Religious work ==
In the Epistle-dedicatory to Sir Henry Fanshaw, knight, the king's remembrancer in his highness's court of Exchequer, prefixed to Attersoll's "Historie of Balak", he speaks, among other of Fanshaw's acts of kindness shown towards him, "of the fauour you shewed me at my repaire vnto you, in that trouble which befell me about the poore liuing that now I enioy". Succeeding sentences state that the "trouble" was occasioned by a suspicion on the part of Attersoll's parishioners that the new parson was too much of a scholar, and unlikely to be a preacher after the type of their former.

Attersoll was the author of many biblical commentaries and religious treatises. His earliest works were entitled "The Pathway to Canaan" (1609) and "The Historie of Balak the King and Balaam the false Prophet" (1610). These, with others of the same kind, all in quarto, were, severally, expositions of portions of the Book of Numbers, and were ultimately brought together in a noble folio of 1300 pages in 1618. In the quartos and folio alike there is abundant evidence of wide if somewhat undigested learning, penetrative insight, and felicitous application in the most unexpected ways of old facts and truths to present-day circumstances and experiences. All this applies especially to his "New Covenant" (1614), and to his next important work, which reached a second edition in 1633, viz. "A Commentarie upon the Epistle of Saint Pavle to Philemon Written by William Attersoll, Minister of the Word of God, at Isfield in Sussex. The second edition, corrected and enlarged" (1633). It is this volume that has been wrongly assigned to William Aspinwall.

In 1632 Attersoll published a volume called the "Conversion of Nineveh". In the Epistle-dedicatory to Sir John Rivers he writes of himself as an old man: "Having heretofore upon sundry occasions divulged sundry bookes which are abroad in the world, whereby I received much encouragement, I resolved, notwithstanding being now in yeares, and as it were donatus rude, preparing for a nunc dimittis, utterly to give over and to enjoyne myselfe a perpetuall silence touching this kind of writing, and content myselfe with performing the other more necessary duty of teaching. Nevertheless, being requested, or rather importuned, by friends to publish some things which had been a long time by mee ... I deliuered into their hands these three treatises". The other two treatises (besides "Nineveh") are "God's Trvmpet sovnding the Alarme" (1632)and "Phisicke against Famine, or a Soueraigne Preseruatiue" (1632).

He was the maternal grandfather of Nicholas Culpeper. Shortly after his birth Culpeper's father died, and he was removed to Isfield where he was brought up by his mother. Attersoll was a great influence on the young boy's political and religious beliefs, and taught him up to the age of 16 both Latin and Greek. As a boy Culpepper became interested in astronomy, astrology, time, his grandfather's collection of clocks, and the medical texts found in Attersoll's library. It was his grandmother who introduced him to the world of medicinal plants and herbs.

== Death ==
As shown by the Isfield Register, Attersoll was buried "30 May 1640", and thus had remained in his original "poore liuing" for upwards of forty years. He describes himself as "a poore labourer in the Lord's vineyard, and a simple watchman in his house". He also speaks of "the poore cottage" in which he resided (Ep. to Nineveh). His works are now extremely rare.

Another William Attersoll, probably his son, proceeded A.B. 1611, A.M. 1615 at Peterhouse; and a third of the same names proceeded A.B. 1672 at Catherine Hall. In all likelihood the former was the William Attersoll of Calamy, whose name is simply entered under "Hoadley (East), Sussex", as among the ejected of 1662, and so, too, in Samuel Palmer's Nonconformist's Memorial.
