= Claud Aspinwall =

American politician

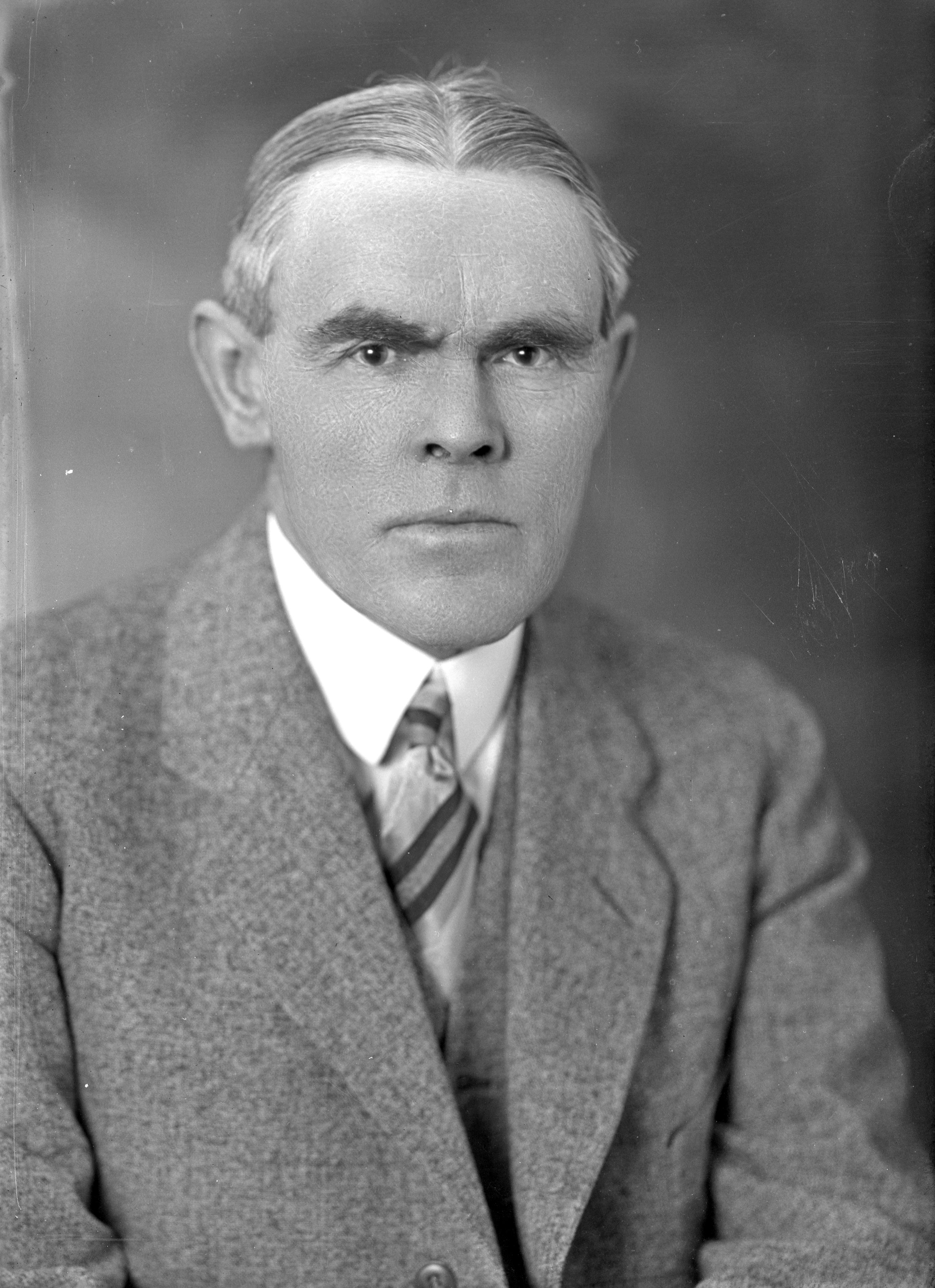
- Aspinwall in 1921

Member of the Washington House of Representatives
- In office January 9, 1933 – January 14, 1935
- Preceded by: J. C. Price
- Succeeded by: Ben S. Sawyer
- Constituency: 22nd
- In office January 8, 1917 – January 9, 1933
- Preceded by: Lewis J. Morrison
- Succeeded by: Martin J. B. Johnson
- Constituency: 28th

Personal details
- Born: Claud Cassius Aspinwall; January 1, 1873 Wisconsin, U.S.
- Died: October 26, 1944 (aged 71) Olympia, Washington, U.S.
- Party: Republican

Claud Cassius Aspinwall (January 1, 1873 – October 26, 1944) was an American politician in the state of Washington. He served in the Washington House of Representatives. He served as Speaker from 1933 to 1935 and from 1945 to 1947.
