= Mike Aspinall =

English rugby union footballer and coach

Mike Aspinall (born 26 March 1983 (age 41) in Leeds, West Yorkshire) is director of coaching at Harrogate RUFC, a rugby union club that plays in the English National Division 2. Harrogate was back-to-back Yorkshire Cup champion in 2015 and 2016 and finished in the top six in National Division 2.

It is said that Harrogate in Aspinall's tenure had the worst budgets in national league rugby as Harrogate nearly went under just before he took over. Aspinall stepped down from his role at Harrogate in 2016 to concentrate on running his property businesses.

Before moving into coaching full-time, Aspinall had played for Saracens, Leeds Tykes/Carnegie, Harrogate and Hull Ionians. He was also capped by England U18 in 2001. His usual position is scrum-half, but in recent years he has regularly appeared at fly-half.

Aspinall became head coach at Harrogate in 2007 and, following a strong few seasons for the club, was invited by Andy Key and Neil Back to join the Leeds Carnegie backroom staff in 2010 for their assault on the Premiership. Throughout his time at Leeds, Aspinall continued to play and coach at Harrogate, overseeing a record-equaling 12 game victory streak.

Having left Carnegie in Summer 2012, Aspinall returned to Harrogate full-time to concentrate on his RFU Level 4 coaching course and to broaden his experiences. In August 2012, Aspinall was appointed Head Coach at Manchester University and introduced a new coach mentoring system at Harrogate.

Aspinall is now the managing director of Northern Property Partners based in Leeds and is said to be taking a few years out of the game.
