= Samuel Angier =

English nonconformist minister

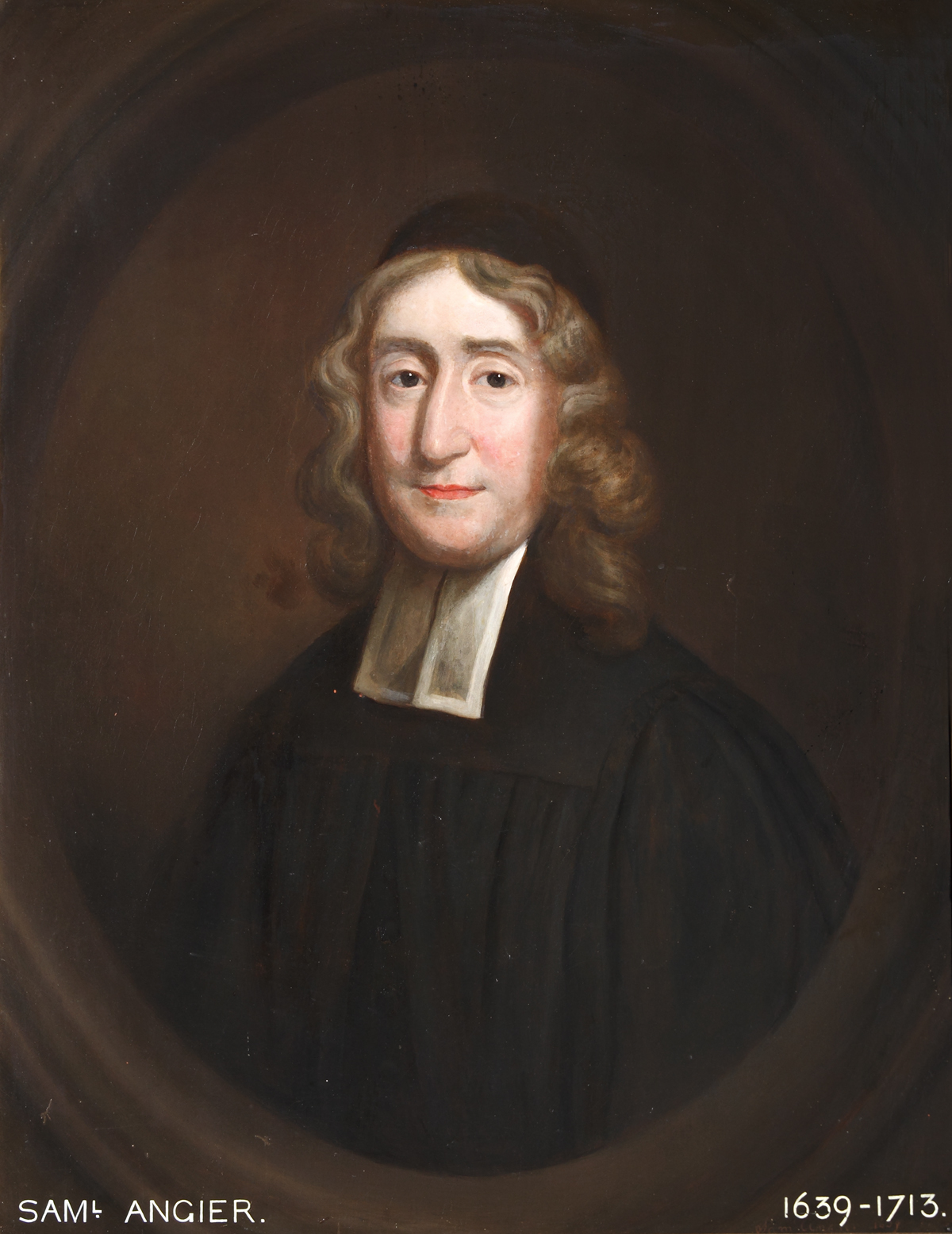

Samuel Angier (28 August 1639 – 8 November 1713). was an English nonconformist minister, one of the first after 1660 to receive presbyterian ordination.

== Life ==
The nephew of John Angier, he was born at Dedham 28 August 1639. He was a pupil of Richard Busby. He went to Christ Church, Oxford, in 1659, but was compelled to leave by the Act of Uniformity 1662.

After some time staying with John Owen he settled as assistant to his uncle at Denton. His ordination, which took place in 1672 at the house of Robert Eaton in Deansgate, Manchester, was the first presbyterian ordination amongst the nonconformists in the north of England, and perhaps the first in any part of the kingdom.

At his uncle's death 1677 many people supported Samuel Angier as his successor. The warden and fellows of Manchester, however, were not disposed to appoint another nonconformist, and the Rev. John Ogden was nominated; but great difficulty was experienced in inducing Samuel Angier to give up possession of the house. He retired to the adjacent village of Dukinfield and started preaching there.

He had to suffer for his nonconformity, and in 1680 was excommunicated; but under the Act of Toleration in 1689 he became minister of a dissenting meeting at Dukinfield, where a chapel was built for him in 1708. In his later years he was almost blind, and he died 8 November 1713.

Angier kept a register of 'christenings and some marriages and funerals' from 1677 to 1713. One entry relates to the death, 20 February 1698, of another Samuel Angier, who is believed to have been a minister of the 'ancient chapel' of Toxteth Park, Liverpool.

== Family ==
He was married to Anne Mosley and they had four children; Bezaleel was a London physician, John became a Bristol merchant, Ann married preacher John Cooper and Margaret married preacher Ralph Lathrop.
