= Lisa Aspinwall =

American professor of social psychology and health psychology

Lisa G. Aspinwall is an American researcher and professor of Social Psychology and Health Psychology at the University of Utah. In 2000, she was honored as 2nd place recipient of the John Marks Templeton Positive Psychology Prize for her work on optimism and psychological resilience.

== Education ==
Aspinwall received her B.A. in psychology in 1987 from Stanford University, with honors and with distinction. She went on to earn her M.A. and PhD (both in social psychology) from UCLA, in 1988 and 1991, respectively.

== Career ==
Aspinwall served at University of Maryland as an assistant professor (1991–1997) and later an associate professor (1997–2000) of psychology, where she received the Certificate of Teaching Excellence. She then transitioned to the University of Utah, where she served as an associate professor (2000–2013), professor (2013-present) and department chair (2015–2018).

== Research ==
Aspinwall's main body of research is related to cancer patients. She has published articles on genetic testing for cancer prevention, as well as the effects of positive psychology on cancer survivors.
