= Richard Callaway =

American frontiersman, military officer, politician, and hunter (1717 – 1780)

- Born: June 14, 1717; Virginia, Great Britain
- Died: November 8, 1780 (aged 63); Boonesborough, Kentucky
- Spouse(s): Elizabeth Hoy, Frances Walton
- Children: John, Keziah, George, Zachariah, Mildred, and 9 others
- Military career
- Allegiance: United States
- Service years: 1778
- Conflicts: American Revolutionary War Siege of Boonesborough

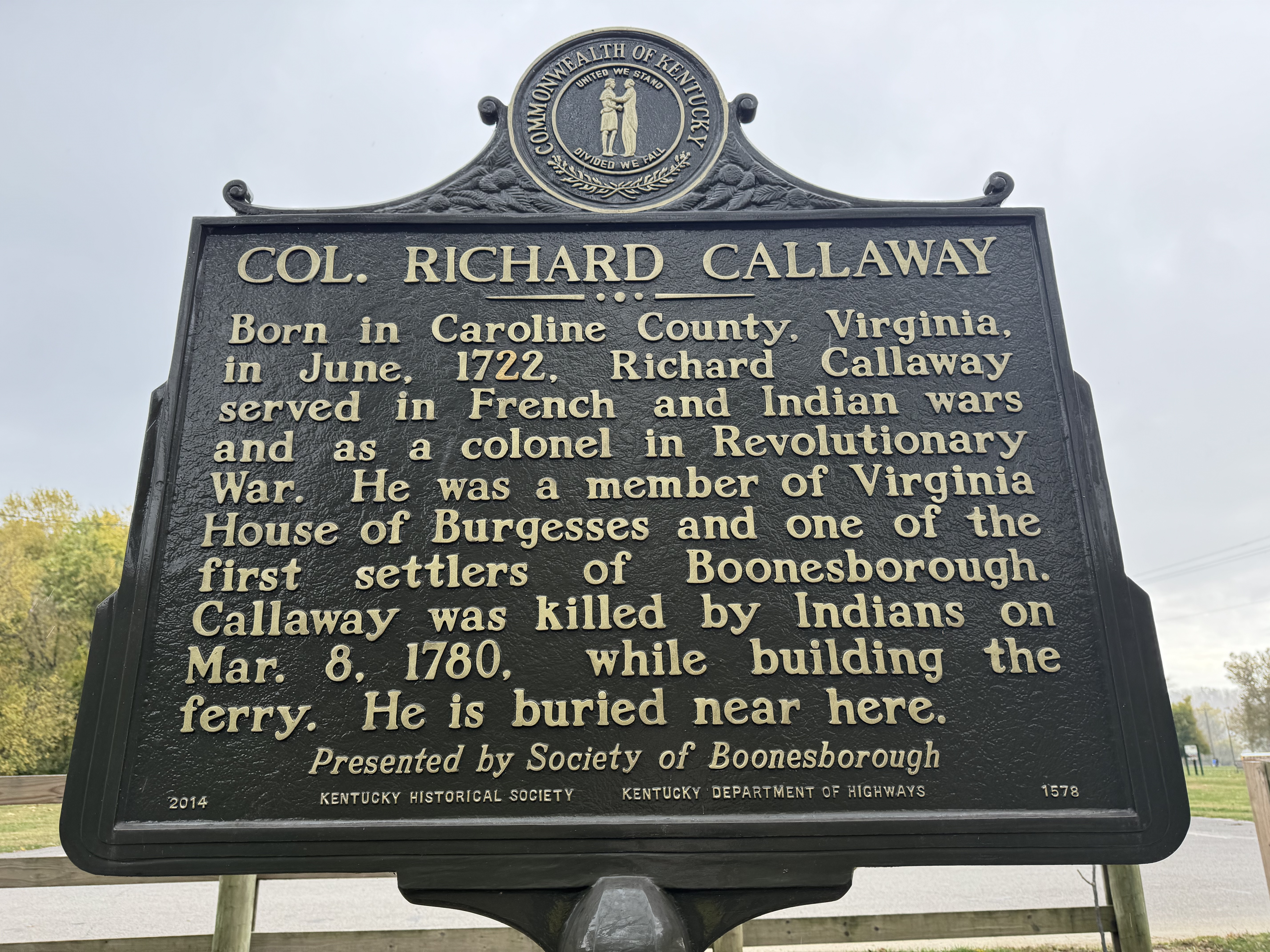
Historical marker about Callaway at Fort Boonesborough.

Richard Callaway (June 14, 1717 – November 8, 1780) was an American frontiersman, military officer, politician, and hunter who was one of the first white settlers in modern-day Kentucky. Born in Essex County, Virginia, Callaway joined Daniel Boone in 1775 in marking the Wilderness Road into central Kentucky, becoming one of the founders of Boonesborough, Kentucky. He took part in organizing the short-lived Transylvania Colony. In 1776, two of Callaway's daughters, along with Daniel Boone's Jemima, were abducted outside Boonesborough by Cherokee and Shawnee raiding party. Callaway led one of a group of settlers in the successful rescue of the girls. His nephew Flanders Callaway later married Jemima Boone. In April 1777, Callaway and John Todd were elected to the Virginia legislature as burgesses from Kentucky County, Virginia.

In June 1778, he was appointed a justice of the peace and made colonel of the county's militia. Callaway was a defender during the Siege of Boonesborough. He disagreed with some of Boone's actions and resented the younger man's popularity with the settlers, and later brought court martial charges against Boone. Callaway was angry when the court acquitted and then promoted him. On November 8, 1780, Colonel Richard Callaway was ambushed about a mile outside of Boonesborough by a Shawnee war party. He was killed and scalped, and his body was mutilated. Calloway County, Kentucky, was named after Callaway.
