= William Aspinall =

English rugby league footballer

Personal information
- Full name: William Aspinall
- Born: Leeds, Yorkshire
- Died: Auckland, New Zealand

Playing information
- Weight: 13 st (182 lb; 83 kg)
- Position: Loose forward
Club
Years	Team	Pld	T	G	FG	P
1962–≥72	Keighley

William "Bill" Aspinall (birth unknown) is a former professional rugby league footballer who played in the 1960s and 1970s. He played at club level for Keighley, as a loose forward.

== Testimonial match ==
Bill Aspinall's Testimonial match at Keighley took place in 1972.
