= Davidson County Schools =

School district in North Carolina, United States

Davidson County Schools is a School district in Davidson County, North Carolina. The administrative education board is headquartered just off of U.S. Highway 64 on County School Road just outside the city limits of Lexington, North Carolina. The school system comprises six high schools, six middle schools, one consolidated middle/high school, eighteen elementary schools, one extended day school, one ungraded special school, and a STEM based career academy. The superintendent is Dr. Gregg Slate.

The district includes the majority of Davidson County. Two other school districts, Lexington City Schools and Thomasville City Schools, are also found in Davidson County.

== Schools ==
=== Elementary schools ===
- Brier Creek Elementary (Thomasville)
- Churchland Elementary (Churchland)
- Davis-Townsend Elementary (Lexington)
- Denton Elementary (Denton)
- Fair Grove Elementary (Thomasville)
- Friedberg Elementary (Arcadia)
- Friendship Elementary (Wallburg)
- Hasty Elementary (Thomasville)
- Midway Elementary (Midway)
- Northwest Elementary (Arcadia)
- Pilot Elementary (Pilot)
- Reeds Elementary (Reeds)
- Silver Valley Elementary (Silver Valley)
- Southwood Elementary (Lexington, Linwood)
- Southmont Elementary (Southmont)
- Tyro Elementary (Tyro)
- Wallburg Elementary (Wallburg)
- Welcome Elementary (Welcome)

=== Middle schools ===
- E. Lawson Brown Middle (Thomasville)
- Central Davidson Middle (Lexington)
- Ledford Middle (Thomasville)
- North Davidson Middle (Welcome)
- Oak Grove Middle (Midway)
- Tyro Middle (Tyro)

=== High schools ===
- Central Davidson High School (Lexington)
- Davidson County High School (Lexington)
- Davidson Early College (Lexington)
- East Davidson High School (Thomasville)
- Ledford High School (Wallburg)
- North Davidson High School (Welcome)
- Oak Grove High School (Midway)
- West Davidson High School (Tyro)

=== Consolidated schools ===
- South Davidson Middle and High School (6–12)(Denton)

=== Non-Traditional schools ===
- Stoner-Thomas School (Lexington)
- Yadkin Valley Regional Career Academy (Lexington)
