= South Davidson Middle and High School =

American public school in North Carolina

South Davidson High School

Location
- 14956 S. NC Highway 109; Denton, North Carolina 27239; United States; 35°40′25″N 80°06′11″W

Information
- Type: Public
- Established: 1989 (37 years ago)
- Oversight: Davidson County Schools
- CEEB code: 340975
- Principal: Christopher Adams
- Teaching staff: 46.61 (FTE)
- Grades: 6–12
- Enrollment: 670 (2022–2023)
- Student to teacher ratio: 14.37
- Campus type: Rural
- Colors: Blue and White
- Athletics: NCHSAA 1A
- Athletics conference: Greater Triad 1A/2A
- Mascot: Wildcat
- Nickname: Wildcats
- Yearbook: The Lair
- Website: sdmhs.davidson.k12.nc.us

South Davidson Middle and High School (commonly referred to as "South") is public consolidated middle and high school in Denton, North Carolina. It is part of the Davidson County Schools system and serves the Denton and Silver Valley areas.

== History ==
South Davidson High School was originally Denton High School, which was opened in 1929 as part of a plan to bring a public high school to southern Davidson County. In 1989, the building became Denton Elementary School and the high school moved to its present larger building one mile north of Denton and was renamed South Davidson High School.

When the new high school opened, Silver Valley Elementary, which had been a feeder school for nearby Central Davidson High School, became an additional feeder school for South Davidson. In 2009, a new wing was opened, including a new band room, new administrative offices, and eight new classrooms.

Beginning with the 2022–2023 school year, South Davidson Middle and High were consolidated into one school, due to low enrollment with both schools.

== Administration ==
- Principal – Chris Adams
- Assistant principals – Emily Osborne, Kimberly Welch

== Feeder schools ==
- Denton Elementary
- Silver Valley Elementary

== Athletics ==
SDHS athletic teams are the Wildcats. The school is a part of the Greater Triad 1A/2A Conference.

The sport teams of South are:

- Baseball
- Basketball
- Cross country
- Football
- Golf
- Soccer
- Softball
- Tennis
- Track and field
- Wrestling

=== Controversies ===
In August 2019, the school made news when a student spray-painted a racist violent phrase on the campus's Spirit Rock, leading to an administrative feud between the Lexington City Schools and Davidson County Schools districts, which was expressed as a football boycott.
