= West Davidson High School =

American public school in North Carolina

Location
- 200 Dragon Drive; Lexington, North Carolina 27295; United States; 35°48′16″N 80°21′57″W

Information
- Type: Public
- Established: 1957 (69 years ago)
- Oversight: Davidson County Schools
- Principal: Nicole Clausi
- Teaching staff: 42.91 (FTE)
- Grades: 9–12
- Enrollment: 743 (2023–2024)
- Student to teacher ratio: 17.31
- Campus: Rural
- Colors: Green, Gold, White
- Slogan: “West is best”
- Nickname: Dragons
- Rival: Central Davidson High School
- Yearbook: Memories
- Website: wdhs.davidson.k12.nc.us

West Davidson High School, (also referenced as "WDHS", or simply as "West") is a public high school located in the Tyro, North Carolina community right outside of Lexington, North Carolina. West is accredited by the Southern Association of Colleges and Schools.

== Administration ==
- Principal – Nicole Clausi
- Assistant principals – Susan Grubb, Jason Lemley

== Feeder schools ==
- Churchland Elementary
- Reeds Elementary
- Tyro Elementary
- Tyro Middle

== Sports ==
West Davidson High School sports teams are known as the Dragons, with the school colors being green, gold and white. Their biggest rival is Central Davidson High School. List of sports at the school include:

- Football
- Basketball
- Baseball
- Golf
- Softball
- Soccer
- Tennis
- Track and field
- Cross Country
- Swimming
- Volleyball
- Wrestling
- Cheerleading

=== Sporting achievements ===
- 1986, NCHSAA 2A Women's Basketball State Champions
- 2010, NCHSAA 1A/2A Women's Swimming State Champions
- 2016, NCHSAA 1A/2A Women's Golf State Champions
- 2016, NCHSAA 2A Cheerleading State Champions
- 2018, NCHSAA 2A Volleyball State Runners-Up

== Notable alumni ==
- Josh Bush (born 1989), former NFL player and Super Bowl 50 champion with the Denver Broncos
- Johnny Temple (1927–1994), former MLB second baseman, 6x All-Star selection and member of the Cincinnati Reds Hall of Fame
