= Pilot, North Carolina =

Pilot is the name of two places in the U.S. state of North Carolina:

- Pilot, Davidson County, North Carolina
- Pilot, Franklin County, North Carolina

== See also ==
- Mount Pilot
- Pilot Mountain, North Carolina
