= Murfreesboro City Schools =

School district in Murfreesboro, Tennessee, United States

Murfreesboro City Schools (MCS) is a school district headquartered in Murfreesboro, Tennessee, in the Nashville metropolitan area of Middle Tennessee.

The district only operates elementary schools; Rutherford County Schools operates middle and high schools serving Murfreesboro. MCS also operates an Extended School Program (ESP) throughout the year from 6:00 am to 6:00 pm.

== Schools ==
- Black Fox Elementary School
- Bradley Academy
- Cason Lane Academy
- Discovery School @ Bellwood
- Erma Siegel Elementary School
- Hobgood Elementary School
- John Pittard Elementary School
- Mitchell-Neilson Schools (separate campuses for primary and elementary)
- Northfield Elementary School
- Overall Creek Elementary School
- Reeves Rogers Elementary School
- Salem Elementary School
- Scales Elementary School
