= Badgett =

Badgett is a surname. Notable people with the surname include:

- Lee Badgett (born 1960), American economist
- Rogers Badgett (1917–2005), American businessman
- The Badgett Sisters, American folk and gospel group

== See also ==
Adderton–Badgett House, house near Denton, Davidson County, North Carolina, US
