= Churchland Plutonic Suite =

Large granitic plutonic formation in central North Carolina

- Stratigraphic range: ~282 ± 6 Ma
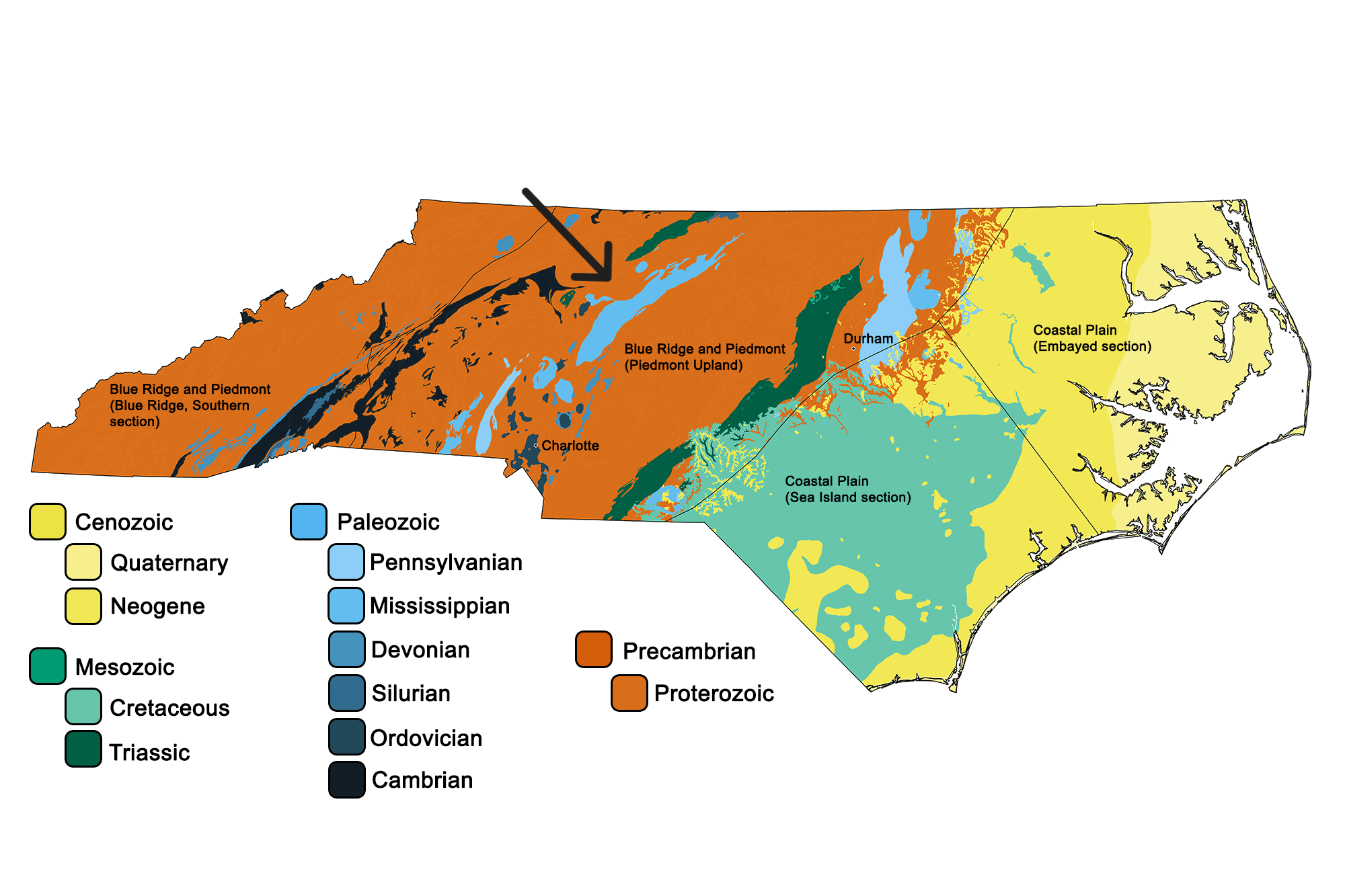
- North Carolina formation ages. The black arrow points to the Churchland Plutonic Suite in light blue
- Type: Granite Pluton
- Area: 126 square miles (330 km^{2})
- Thickness: up to 6 miles (10 km)

Lithology
- Primary: Granite: Metacystic to equigranular.
- Other: Grandodiorite, Biotite Monzogranite

Location
- Location: North Carolina
- Coordinates: 36.0304°N 80.1031°W
- Region: Piedmont
- Country: United States

Type section
- Named for: Churchland, North Carolina
- Location: North Carolina
- Coordinates: 35.78750°N 80.41815°W
- Approximate paleocoordinates: 13.6297°N 2.4392°E

General location of the Churchland Plutonic Suite

The Churchland Plutonic Suite is a large granite body located in central North Carolina. Granites here date to the late Paleozoic as the supercontinent Pangea was in its compressional stage. This formation is also known as a post-metamorphic, Alleghanian-age granite plutons. Magma generation was related to shear zone melt during the late Alleghenian Orogeny.

== Geology ==
The Churchland Plutonic suite is located in central North Carolina. It dates back to ~282± 6 Ma, which places it at the end of the Artinskian. It is related to other intrusive suites in the area; namely the Landis, Mooresville, York, Clover, and the Rolesville plutons associated with the Charlotte Belt.

The granitic rocks are classified as biotite monzogranite, typically porphyritic, but with fine-grained phases. It also has a weak flow foliation structure. Other minerals include: epidote, potassium feldspar, muscovite, plagioclase feldspar, and quartz.

== Geological context ==
The Churchland Plutonic Suite's formation is tied to the late Alleghenian Orogeny. Magma generation was long (~45 Ma) and slow (~2 cubic kilometers, 1.2 cubic miles per million years). These intrusions formed a southwest to northeast trend line covering 10,500 square kilometres (4,050 mi^{2}). Magma formed by juxtaposition of high temperature rocks against lower-temperature melting rocks, decompression, fluxing, or a combination of these as a result of either transpressional arching or faulting. This happened most often at shear zones. There is no evidence of magma being erupted at the surface.
