= Tyro, North Carolina =

- Census-designated place
- Location within the state of North Carolina
- Coordinates: 35°48′36″N 80°22′12″W
- Country: United States
- State: North Carolina
- County: Davidson

Area
  - Total: 12.85 sq mi (33.28 km^{2})
  - Land: 12.85 sq mi (33.28 km^{2})
  - Water: 0 sq mi (0.00 km^{2})
- Elevation: 824 ft (251 m)

Population (2020)
  - Total: 3,753
  - Density: 635/sq mi (245.2/km^{2})
- Time zone: UTC-5 (Eastern (EST))
  - Summer (DST): UTC-4 (EDT)
- ZIP code: 27295
- FIPS code: 37-69020
- GNIS feature ID: 996400

Tyro is an unincorporated community and census-designated place (CDP) located 7 miles (11 km) west of Lexington and 24 miles (39 km) south of Winston-Salem in Davidson County, North Carolina, United States. As of the 2020 census, the community had a population of 3,753.

== Geography ==
Tyro is located in western Davidson County along North Carolina Highway 150. Neighboring communities include Reeds to the northeast on NC 150, Churchland to the southwest on NC 150, Linwood to the southeast, and the city of Lexington to the east.

Located 6 miles (10 km) west of Tyro is Boone's Cave Park on the Yadkin River. Daniel Boone is rumored to have once hidden in the cave from a group of Native Americans who were avidly pursuing him.

Tyro was named after Edward Tyro, a British explorer who was first granted land tenancy in the area by King Charles II. Tyro was said to be an avid farmer- and was able to spread notoriety in the area for fertile soils that were excellent for tobacco growth. While Tyro's contributions to tobacco farming were widespread in the area, the town did not officially receive the name of "Tyro" until the mid-18th century, when the Tyro Tavern was constructed, and, as a village began to form around the development, it was suggested to honor Tyro's farming legacy, as his last name was also coincidentally Latin for "new beginnings."

According to the United States Census Bureau, the Tyro CDP has an area of 12.9 square miles (33.3 km^{2}), all land.

== Climate ==
Thunderstorms, including some tornadoes, are common during the spring and summer months. Located in central North Carolina, between the Appalachian Mountains and the Mid-Atlantic coast.

Climate data for Tyro, North Carolina
Month	Jan	Feb	Mar	Apr	May	Jun	Jul	Aug	Sep	Oct	Nov	Dec	Year
Mean daily maximum °F (°C)	49.6 (9.8)	54.4 (12.4)	63.3 (17.4)	72.5 (22.5)	79.3 (26.3)	85.5 (29.7)	89.1 (31.7)	87.4 (30.8)	81.6 (27.6)	71.9 (22.2)	61.7 (16.5)	52.6 (11.4)	70.7 (21.5)
Mean daily minimum °F (°C)	28.6 (−1.9)	30.9 (−0.6)	38.0 (3.3)	45.3 (7.4)	54.5 (12.5)	62.9 (17.2)	67.1 (19.5)	65.5 (18.6)	59.1 (15.1)	46.7 (8.2)	37.9 (3.3)	31.0 (−0.6)	47.3 (8.5)
Average precipitation inches (mm)	4.06 (103)	3.78 (96)	4.31 (109)	3.63 (92)	3.93 (100)	4.06 (103)	3.85 (98)	3.63 (92)	3.84 (98)	3.52 (89)	3.47 (88)	3.37 (86)	45.45 (1,154)
Average snowfall inches (cm)	2.4 (6.1)	2.8 (7.1)	1.2 (3.0)	0 (0)	0 (0)	0 (0)	0 (0)	0 (0)	0 (0)	0 (0)	0 (0)	0.6 (1.5)	7 (17.7)
Average precipitation days	10.2	9.3	10.2	9.0	10.0	9.5	10.4	8.4	7.7	6.6	8.8	9.6	109.7
Average snowy days	0.8	0.9	0.4	0	0	0	0	0	0	0	0	0.3	2.4
Mean monthly sunshine hours	170.5	175.2	229.4	246.0	260.4	270.0	269.7	248.0	225.0	220.1	174.0	164.3	2,652.6
Source: NOAA, HKO (sun)

== Demographics ==
=== 2020 census ===
As of the 2020 census, Tyro had a population of 3,753. The median age was 39.0 years. 24.0% of residents were under the age of 18 and 16.5% of residents were 65 years of age or older. For every 100 females there were 102.8 males, and for every 100 females age 18 and over there were 102.3 males age 18 and over.

0.0% of residents lived in urban areas, while 100.0% lived in rural areas.

There were 1,458 households in Tyro, of which 32.1% had children under the age of 18 living in them. Of all households, 52.8% were married-couple households, 19.5% were households with a male householder and no spouse or partner present, and 20.6% were households with a female householder and no spouse or partner present. About 25.6% of all households were made up of individuals and 11.8% had someone living alone who was 65 years of age or older.

There were 1,586 housing units, of which 8.1% were vacant. The homeowner vacancy rate was 0.8% and the rental vacancy rate was 9.8%.

Racial composition as of the 2020 census
Race	Number	Percent
White	3,291	87.7%
Black or African American	92	2.5%
American Indian and Alaska Native	26	0.7%
Asian	14	0.4%
Native Hawaiian and Other Pacific Islander	1	0.0%
Some other race	127	3.4%
Two or more races	202	5.4%
Hispanic or Latino (of any race)	195	5.2%

Historical population
Census	Pop.	Note	%±
2020	3,753		—
U.S. Decennial Census

== Historic sites ==
Haden Place, Capt. John Koonts Jr. Farm, St. Luke's Lutheran Church Cemetery, Nick’s Culo, and Tyro Tavern are listed on the National Register of Historic Places.

== Education ==
Tyro is home to both West Davidson High School and Tyro Middle School; both of which are part of the Davidson County School System.
