= Central Davidson High School =

American public school in North Carolina

Location
- 2747 NC Hwy 47; Lexington, North Carolina 27292; United States
- Coordinates: 35°44′23″N 80°13′19″W

Information
- Type: Public
- Established: 1957 (69 years ago)
- Oversight: Davidson County Schools
- CEEB code: 342263
- Principal: Heather Horton
- Teaching staff: 48.66 (FTE)
- Grades: 9–12
- Enrollment: 935 (2024–2025)
- Student to teacher ratio: 17.82
- Campus type: Rural
- Colors: Red, Black, Silver, White
- Athletics conference: 4-A; PAC Seven
- Mascot: Spartacus
- Nickname: Spartans
- Rival: North Davidson High School; West Davidson High School
- Yearbook: The Spartan
- Website: cdhs.davidson.k12.nc.us

Central Davidson High School (commonly referred to as "Central", "CHS" or "CDHS") is a public high school in Lexington, North Carolina. Central was established in 1957 and is located along NC HWY 47. It is part of the Davidson County Schools system and serves parts of the Lexington, Southmont, Linwood, Hedrick's Grove and Holly Grove areas. The school is accredited by the Southern Association of Colleges and Schools.

== History ==
In the fall of 1957, Central opened after the merger of Davis-Townsend, Linwood, Southmont, and Silver Valley grades 9–12 into one high school. A site on what is now North Carolina Highway 47 was selected for the new school. The same year it opened, the Board of Education named the new consolidated high school "Central High School".

Central's first class, the Class of 1958, decided on the school's mascot, the Spartan, and colors of red, black, silver and white. They were originally going to choose the Trojan as the school mascot but decided on the Spartan instead. "In 1970 the Board of Education authorized the purchase of land for the new high school (our current building) and students began classes in the first phase of the building in 1973."

The new location of the high school, which started construction in September 1971, was right next door to its old campus, which has since then been the home of Central Davidson Middle School. The commons areas, gym, band room, and vocational classrooms weren't completed until a few years later. Prior to that, students had to eat sandwiches in the media center, and play basketball games at the middle school's gym.

In 1981, Central's new football stadium, Spartan Community Stadium, was built, and it wasn't until the late 1980s that they paved the track. Ground was broken in October 2007 for a one-story, 12-class room addition, which opened in the fall of the 2008–2009 school year.

== Administration ==
- Principal: Heather Horton
- Assistant principals: Jeff Everhart, Tonia Maxcy

== Feeder schools ==
- Davis-Townsend Elementary
- Southmont Elementary
- Southwood Elementary
- Central Davidson Middle

== Advanced Placement courses ==
- AP Biology
- AP Calculus
- AP Chemistry
- AP English Language and Composition
- AP English Literature and Composition
- AP Environmental Science
- AP Human Geography
- AP Statistics
- AP US History

== Alma mater ==
Hail, Central, Hail
We proudly stand as Central Spartans,
United as we share
A bond that's built on love and friendship
And comes from those who care. Lift your voices, shout your praises,
Over hill and vail;
Here's to thee, our Alma Mater,
Hail, Central, Hail. Through the years may see us wander
From these hallowed halls,
We will always love and honor
The school within these walls. Lift your voices, shout your praises,
Over hill and vail;
Here's to thee, our Alma Mater,
Hail, Central, Hail.

== Athletics ==
Central is a member of the PAC Seven 4A/5A Conference. Central's biggest rivals are North Davidson and West Davidson High Schools.

The sports teams of Central are:

- Baseball
- Basketball
- Cross country
- Football
- Golf
- Soccer
- Softball
- Swimming
- Tennis
- Track and field
- Volleyball
- Wrestling

=== Sporting achievements ===
Year	Achievements
1960	NCHSAA 2A Baseball State Champions
1979	NCHSAA 2A Women's Basketball State Champions
1991	NCHSAA 1A/2A Wrestling Runners-up
2002	NCHSAA 2A Men's Golf State Champions
2006	NCHSAA 2A Softball Runners-up
2007	NCHSAA 2A Softball State Champions
2008	NCHSAA 2A Softball State Champions
2008	NCHSAA 2A Women's Cross Country Regional Runners-up
2008	NCHSAA 2A Men's Cross Country Regional Runners-up
2009	NCHSAA 2A Softball State Champions
2010	NCHSAA 2A Softball Runners-up
2011–12	Central Carolina Conference Wells Fargo Cup winner
2012–13	Central Carolina Conference Wells Fargo Cup winner

Central's softball team won three consecutive NCHSAA 2A softball state championships from 2007 to 2009. The softball team finished 5th out of 25 in the country in the 2008 US Today/National Fastpitch Coaches Association poll. Central was one out of only two high schools in North Carolina to be recognized nationally in fastpitch softball in 2008.

On June 25, 2009, the women's softball team was given the key to the city of Lexington, North Carolina by former Mayor John Walser.

For the 2011–2012 and 2012–2013 school years, Central won the Wells Fargo Cup for the Central Carolina Conference. Central achieved this due to winning conference championships in the spring sports of men's and women's track and field, softball and women's soccer.

== Band program ==
The band program is made up of two concert bands (the Wind Ensemble and Symphonic Band), which meet daily during the school year, as well as an after-school and voluntary marching band (the Spartan Legion Marching Band). The concert bands perform around four concerts each year, and also perform at the State Band Contest, where they regularly receive superior ratings. The Wind Ensemble was invited to perform at the North Carolina Music Educator's Convention in 2005. In 2016, the Wind Ensemble was invited to play for the Army Band in Washington, D.C. while also receiving a private lesson from the Army Band conductor. March 21, 2005, was proclaimed "Central Davidson Band Day" in North Carolina in honor of the band's performance at the National Festival of States in Washington D.C.

== Notable alumni ==
- Henrietta Walls; one of the first three African-American female scholarship athletes at the University of North Carolina at Chapel Hill. Played professional basketball for the Washington Mystics, and overseas.
