= Philip Sowers House =

Historic house in North Carolina, United States

- U.S. National Register of Historic Places
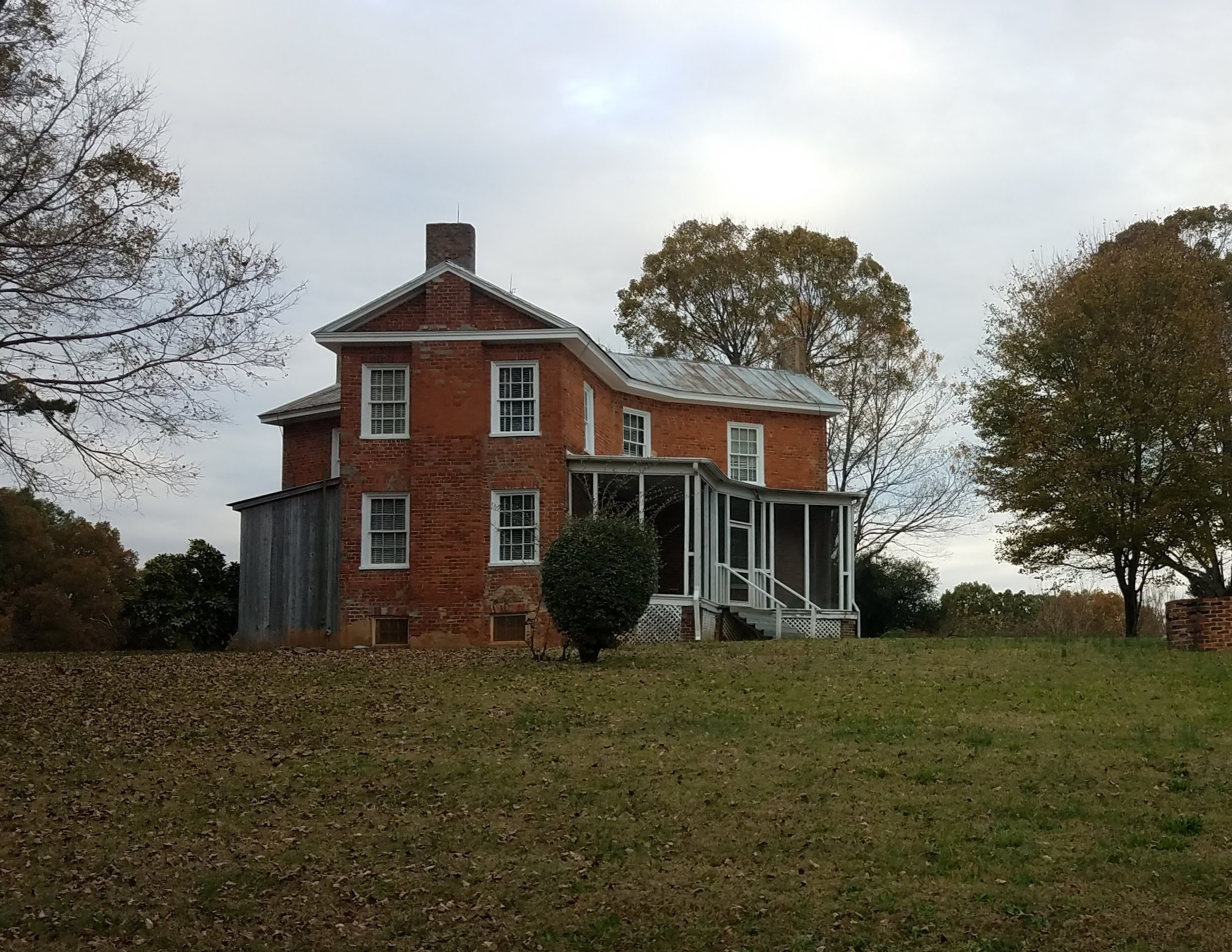

- Location within North Carolina Location within the United States
- Location: SR 1162, near Churchland, North Carolina
- Coordinates: 35°47′30″N 80°27′40″W
- Area: 390 acres (160 ha)
- Built: c. 1861-1870
- Architectural style: Greek Revival
- NRHP reference No.: 80002821
- Added to NRHP: November 25, 1980

Philip Sowers House is a historic home located near Churchland, Davidson County, North Carolina. It was built between about 1861 and 1870, and is a large two-story, vernacular Greek Revival style brick dwelling. The 1 1/2-story rear wing is of log construction and dates to the early-19th century. It has a Y-shaped triple wing design with the rooms arranged around a hexagonal stair hall with a graceful half-spiral staircase. Also on the property are a contributing corn crib and log barn.

It was added to the National Register of Historic Places in 1980.
