= Tyro Tavern =

Historic house in North Carolina, United States

- U.S. National Register of Historic Places
- Location within North Carolina Location within the United States
- Location: NC 150, Tyro, North Carolina
- Coordinates: 35°48′23″N 80°22′37″W
- Area: less than one acre
- Built: c. 1840
- Architectural style: Greek Revival
- MPS: Davidson County MRA
- NRHP reference No.: 84002154
- Added to NRHP: August 16, 1984

Tyro Tavern, also known as Thompson House and Davis House, is a historic home located at Tyro, Davidson County, North Carolina. It was built about 1840, and is a two-story, five bay by three bay, Greek Revival style brick dwelling. It has a one-story, shed roofed rear porch.

It was added to the National Register of Historic Places in 1984.
