= Beallmont =

Historic house in North Carolina, United States

- U.S. National Register of Historic Places
- Location within North Carolina Location within the United States
- Location: SR 1133, near Linwood, North Carolina
- Coordinates: 35°44′51″N 80°20′23″W
- Area: 8 acres (3.2 ha)
- Architectural style: Federal
- MPS: Davidson County MRA
- NRHP reference No.: 84001991
- Added to NRHP: July 10, 1984

Beallmont, also known as the Moore-Beall House, is a historic home located near Linwood, Davidson County, North Carolina. The main section dates to the late-18th or early-19th century, and is a two-story, Federal style frame dwelling. It has later additions of a one-story front porch, a two-story rear wing, and a one-story east side wing. The house was remodeled about 1840 in an approximation of Andrew Jackson Downing's "cottage" style.

It was added to the National Register of Historic Places in 1984.
