= Josh Bush =

American football player (born 1989)

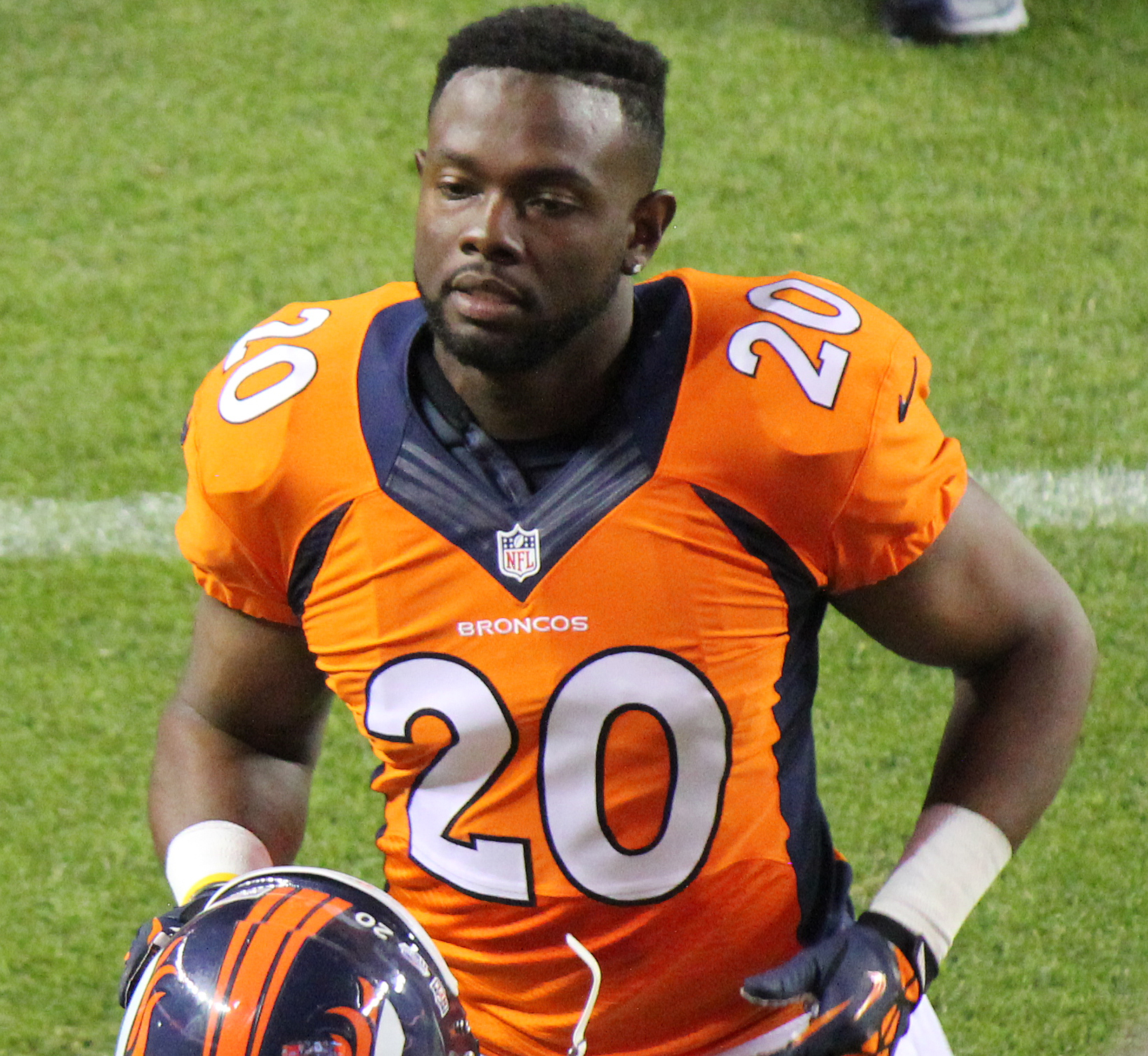
- Bush with the Denver Broncos in 2015

No. 32, 20
- Position: Safety

Personal information
- Born: March 5, 1989 (age 37); Burlington, North Carolina, U.S.
- Listed height: 5 ft 11 in (1.80 m)
- Listed weight: 205 lb (93 kg)

Career information
- High school: West Davidson (Lexington, North Carolina)
- College: Wake Forest (2007–2011)
- NFL draft: 2012: 6th round, 187th overall pick

Career history
- New York Jets (2012–2014); Denver Broncos (2014–2015); Buffalo Bills (2015); Denver Broncos (2015)

Awards and highlights
- Super Bowl champion (50); Third-team All-American (2011); First-team All-ACC (2011)

Career NFL statistics
- Total tackles: 44
- Forced fumbles: 2
- Interceptions: 2
- Stats at Pro Football Reference

Joshua B. Bush (born March 6, 1989) is an American former professional football player who was a safety in the National Football League (NFL). He was selected by the New York Jets in the sixth round of the 2012 NFL draft. He was also a member of the Denver Broncos and won Super Bowl 50 with the team over his home state Carolina Panthers. He played college football for the Wake Forest Demon Deacons.

== Early life ==
Bush attended West Davidson High School where he was a standout football player, on both sides of the ball. Bush was the 2006 Dispatch All-County Defensive Player of the Year, after intercepting six passes as a senior. He also played quarterback as a senior, throwing for 676 yards and rushing for 642. He was also an all-conference baseball player his junior year and played for the Post 8 American Legion team that went to the state finals.

== College career ==
Bush attended Wake Forest University in Winston-Salem, North Carolina. He was a redshirt his freshman year and did not see any playing time. After redshirting in 2007 at Wake, Bush saw limited action as a redshirt freshman, making 17 tackles. He was used mostly at free safety in his sophomore year and had one interception. That one pick was a big one — it ended Russell Wilson's NCAA record of 379 passes without an interception. He played both cornerback and free safety as a junior, starting eight games and recording 33 tackles. As a senior free safety, Bush led the Demon Deacons with six interceptions and was named first-team all-Atlantic Coast Conference. He was also a third-team All-American selection.

== Professional career ==
Pre-draft measurables
Height	Weight	40-yard dash	10-yard split	20-yard split	20-yard shuttle	Three-cone drill	Vertical jump	Broad jump	Bench press
5 ft 11 in (1.80 m)	208 lb (94 kg)	4.50 s	1.54 s	2.57 s	4.45 s	7.02 s	33.5 in (0.85 m)	9 ft 7 in (2.92 m)	16 reps
All values from Pro Day

=== New York Jets ===
The New York Jets drafted Bush with the 27th pick of the 6th round (187th overall) in the 2012 NFL draft. Bush signed a four-year contract on May 6, 2012. He was released on October 15, 2014.

=== Denver Broncos ===
Bush was signed to the Denver Broncos' practice squad on November 18, 2014. On December 28, Bush intercepted Oakland Raiders quarterback Derek Carr in a 47–14 win to end the regular season. On October 1, 2015, he was waived by the team.

=== Buffalo Bills ===
Bush was signed by the Buffalo Bills on October 14, 2015, after safety Aaron Williams was placed on short–term injured reserve. He was released by the team on October 23.

=== Denver Broncos (second stint) ===
On December 1, 2015, the Broncos signed Bush to the active roster. On February 7, 2016, Bush was part of the Broncos team that won Super Bowl 50. In the game, the Broncos defeated the Carolina Panthers by a score of 24–10. Bush recorded two tackles in the Super Bowl.

== Post-playing career ==
Bush joined Richard Childress Racing in 2021 as a pit crew member. He made his debut in the NASCAR Cup Series in the Coca-Cola 600 as the rear tire changer for Austin Dillon. As of 2025, he currently serves as a pit crew member for Daniel Suárez's No. 99 Trackhouse Racing.
