= St. Luke's Lutheran Church Cemetery =

Historic church and cemetery in Davidson County, North Carolina, US

- U.S. National Register of Historic Places
- Location within North Carolina Location within the United States
- Location: SR 1183, near Tyro, North Carolina
- Coordinates: 35°49′00″N 80°22′30″W
- Area: 1.5 acres (0.61 ha)
- Built by: Hege, H. J.
- MPS: Anglo-German Cemeteries TR
- NRHP reference No.: 84002147
- Added to NRHP: July 10, 1984

St. Luke's Lutheran Church Cemetery, also known as Sandy Creek Cemetery, is a historic church cemetery located near Tyro, Davidson County, North Carolina. It is associated with the St. Luke's Lutheran Church, founded in 1790 as Swicegood Meeting House. It contains approximately 300 burials, with the earliest gravestone dated to 1804. It features a unique collection of folk gravestones by local stonecutters erected in Davidson County in the late-18th and first half of the 19th centuries.

It was listed on the National Register of Historic Places in 1984.
