= East Davidson High School =

American public school in North Carolina

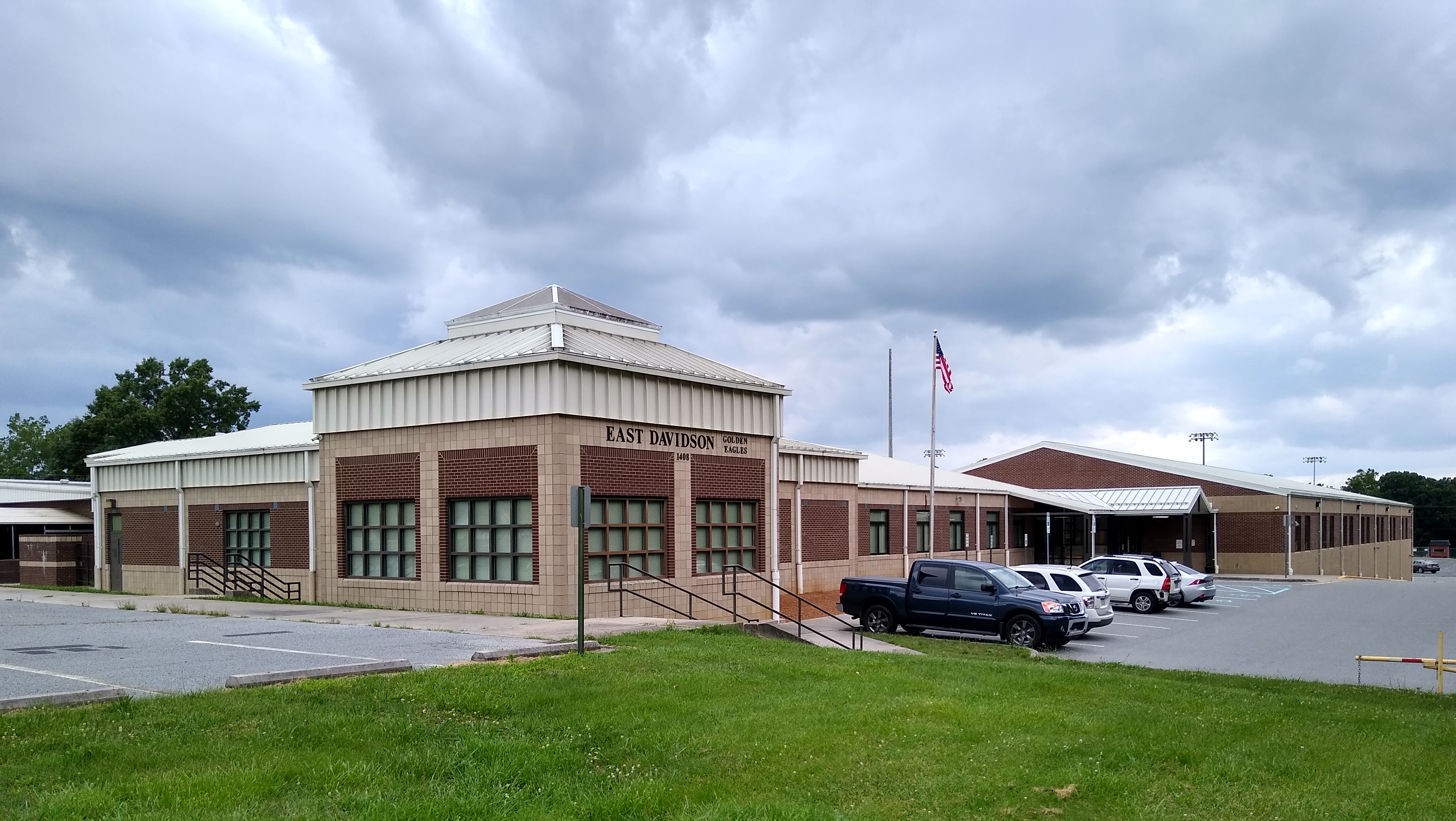
- East Davidson High School, June 2020

Location
- 1408 Lake Road; Thomasville, North Carolina 27360; United States; 35°51′02″N 80°06′04″W

Information
- Other name: East
- Type: Public
- Oversight: Davidson County Schools
- CEEB code: 343955
- Principal: Jennifer Woodrum
- Staff: 39.54 (FTE)
- Grades: 9–12
- Enrollment: 722 (2023–2024)
- Student to teacher ratio: 18.26
- Campus type: Rural
- Colors: Black, Gold, White
- Athletics conference: 3-A Central Carolina Conference
- Nickname: Golden Eagles
- Yearbook: The Claw
- Website: edhs.davidson.k12.nc.us

East Davidson High School (commonly referred to as "East") is a public high school in Thomasville, North Carolina. The students of East Davidson are known as the Golden Eagles. The colors for East Davidson are gold, black, and white.

East Davidson opened in 1961 with students in grades 9 through 12 from Pilot High School and Fair Grove High School merging to form a new school.

== Athletics ==
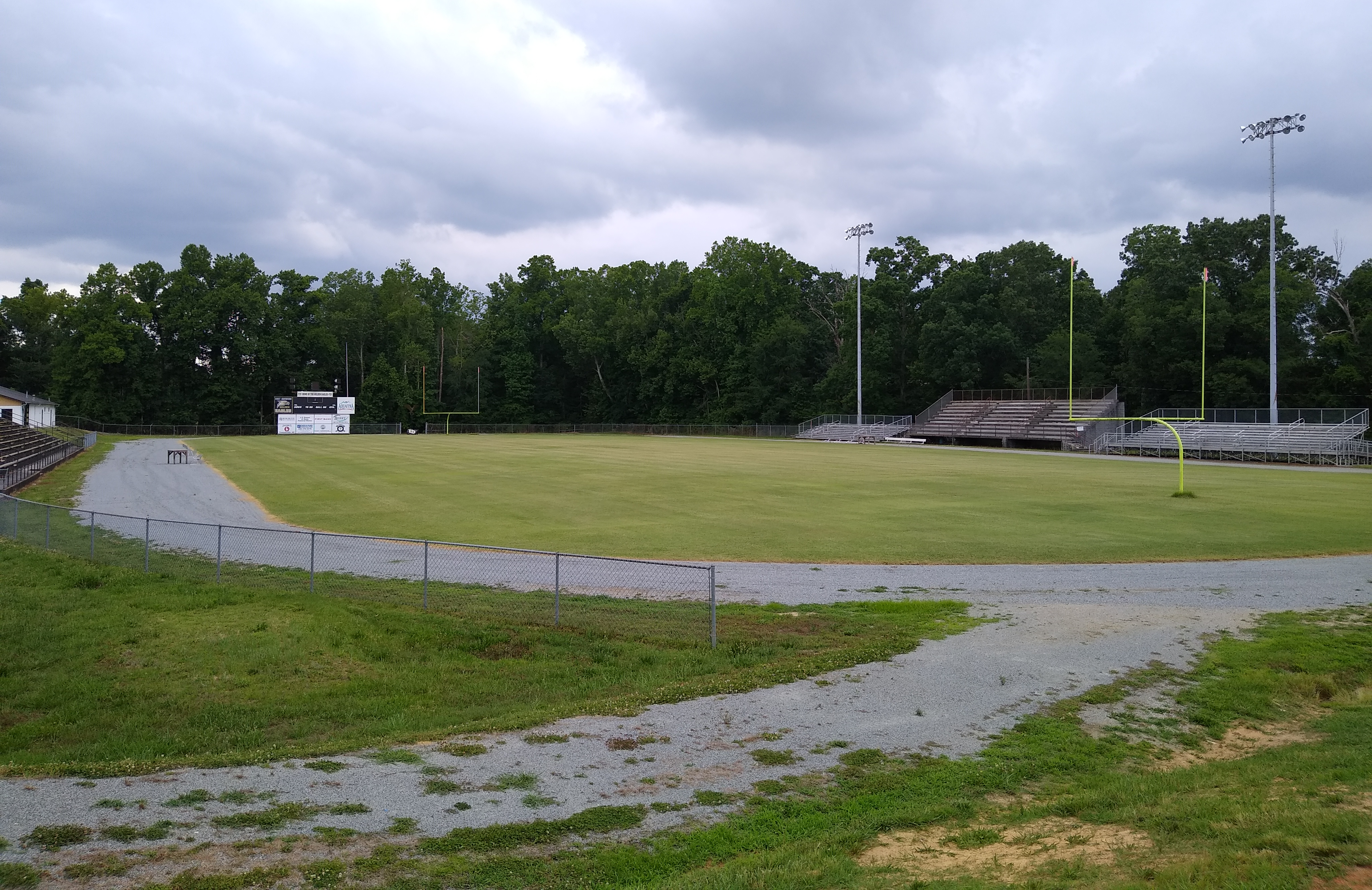
Football field

East Davidson is a member of the 3A Central Carolina Conference. The sports teams of East Davidson are:

- Baseball
- Basketball
- Cross country
- Football
- Golf
- Soccer
- Softball
- Swimming
- Tennis
- Track and field
- Volleyball
- Wrestling

=== Sporting achievements ===
Year	Achievements
1978	2A Baseball State Runners-up
1981	2A Baseball State Runners-up
1984	1A/2A Softball State Champions
1987	1A/2A Women's Cross Country State Champions
1993	1A/2A Wrestling Dual Team State Champions
1995	1A/2A Wrestling Dual Team State Champions
1996	1A/2A Wrestling State Runners-up
1996	2A Baseball State Runners-up
1997	1A/2A Wrestling State Runners-up
1997	1A/2A Men's Golf State Champions
1998	1A/2A Wrestling State Runners-up
1999	2A Men's Golf State Champions
1999	2A Baseball State Champions
2008	2A Women's Basketball State Champions
2016	2A Women's Basketball State Runners-up

== Notable alumni ==
- Chad Barefoot, North Carolina senator representing the 18th District
- Victoria Livengood, mezzo-soprano and voice teacher
