= Jersey Baptist Church Cemetery =

Historic site in Davidson County, North Carolina, US

- U.S. National Register of Historic Places
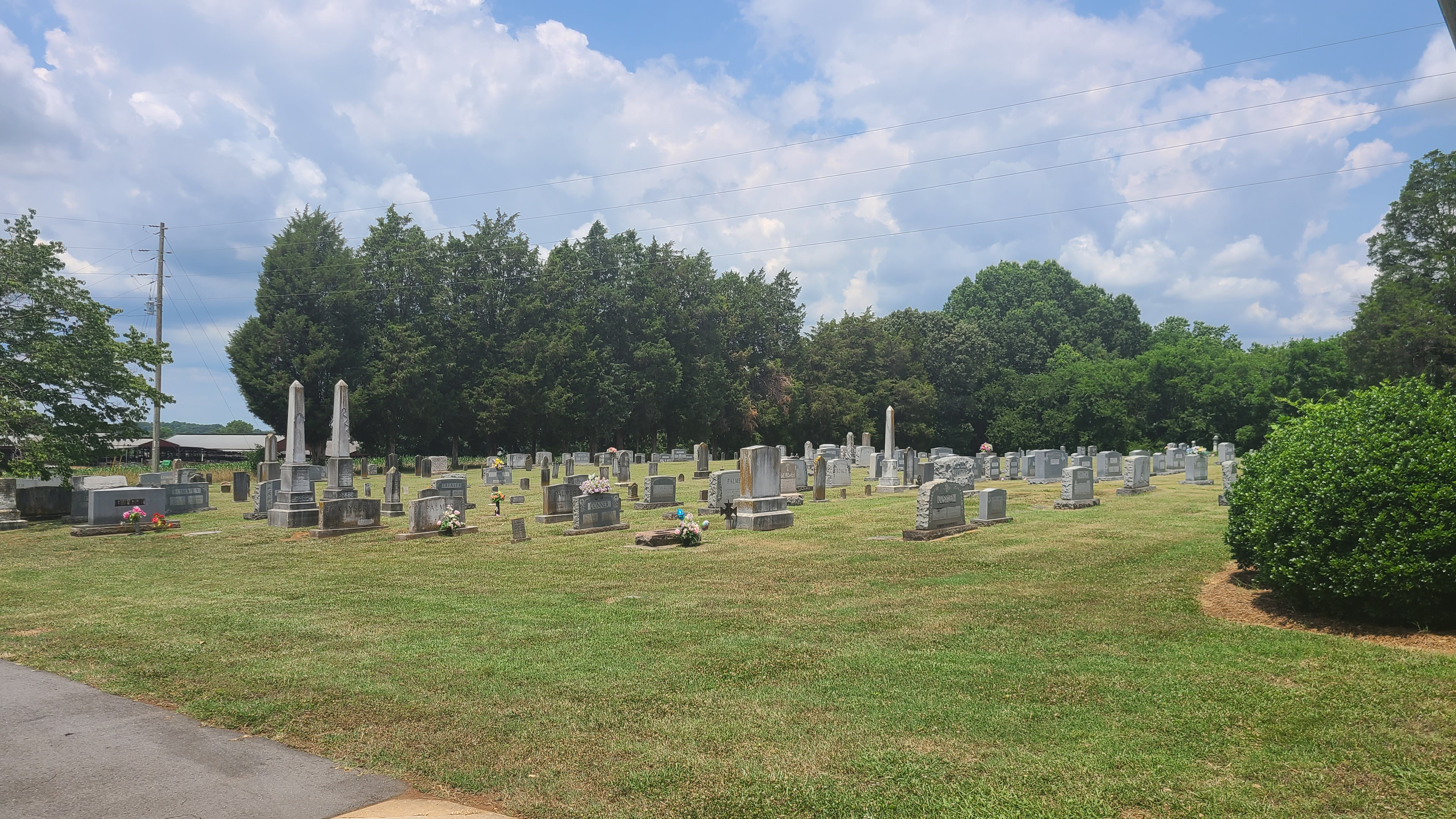

- Location within North Carolina Location within the United States
- Location: SR 1272, Linwood, North Carolina
- Coordinates: 35°43′57″N 80°18′43″W
- Area: 3.5 acres (1.4 ha)
- Built: 1755
- Architect: Multiple
- MPS: Anglo-German Cemeteries TR
- NRHP reference No.: 84002027
- Added to NRHP: July 10, 1984

Jersey Baptist Church Cemetery is a historic church cemetery located on SR 1272 in Linwood, Davidson County, North Carolina, United States. The church was founded in 1755, and the current Jersey Settlement Meeting House was built nearby in 1842. The cemetery contains approximately 50 burials, with the earliest gravestone dated to 1772. It features a unique collection of folk gravestones by local stonecutters erected in Davidson County in the late-18th and first half of the 19th centuries.

The cemetery was added to the National Register of Historic Places in 1984.
