= Jersey Settlement Meeting House =

United States national historic place

- U.S. National Register of Historic Places
- Location within North Carolina Location within the United States
- Location: N side SR 1272 0.2 mi. E of jct. with SR 1104, near Linwood, North Carolina
- Coordinates: 35°43′55″N 80°18′42″W
- Area: 6.5 acres (2.6 ha)
- Built: 1842
- Architectural style: greek revival
- MPS: Davidson County MRA
- NRHP reference No.: 84002032
- Added to NRHP: July 10, 1984

Jersey Settlement Meeting House, also known as Jersey Baptist Church, is a historic church and meeting house located near Linwood, Davidson County, North Carolina. The Baptist congregation was founded around 1755 by settlers from New Jersey. Among them was Benjamin Merrill, a local leader in the Regulator movement from 1765 to 1771, who was captured and executed following the Battle of Alamance.

The current Greek Revival church meeting house was built in 1842 near the Jersey Baptist Church Cemetery. It is a rectangular gable-front brick building, four bays long and two bays wide. A belfry was added in 1897-1899 and a portico in 1945.

The meeting house was added to the National Register of Historic Places in 1984.
