= Furman Bisher =

American sportswriter (1918–2012)

- Born: November 4, 1918; Denton, North Carolina, U.S.
- Died: March 18, 2012 (aged 93); Fayetteville, Georgia, U.S.
- Education: B.A., University of North Carolina, 1938
- Occupations: Sportswriter; Columnist; Newspaper editor
- Employer(s): Lumberton Voice; High Point Enterprise; Charlotte News; The Atlanta Journal-Constitution

James Furman Bisher (November 4, 1918 – March 18, 2012) was an American newspaper sportswriter and columnist for The Atlanta Journal-Constitution in Atlanta, Georgia.

== Early life and education ==
Bisher was born in Denton, North Carolina. His family were descended from German immigrants. Bisher's parents named him after a regionally known Baptist minister, James Furman. After initially attending Furman University, Bisher attended the University of North Carolina at Chapel Hill, where he was a manager for the North Carolina Tar Heels football team.

== Early career ==
After graduating from UNC in 1938, he became the editor of the Lumberton Voice newspaper in Lumberton, North Carolina at the age of 20. During World War II, he served as a lieutenant (junior grade) in the U.S. Navy from 1941 to 1945, editing a military newspaper and managing the Armed Services Radio Network in the South Pacific. After his military service ended, he went to work at the High Point Enterprise in High Point, North Carolina, and then the Charlotte News in Charlotte, North Carolina, where he became the sports editor in 1948.

Bisher landed an interview with former professional baseball player Shoeless Joe Jackson in 1949—the first published interview with Jackson since the 1919 Black Sox Scandal. It was the only interview that the former Chicago White Sox outfielder and star hitter would ever give about his alleged involvement in the fixing of the 1919 World Series, and the old ballplayer maintained his innocence to the end, trusting only Bisher to tell his story. In an era when most other sports writers refused to acknowledge auto racing, he also covered the first stock car cup race in 1949—what would later become known as NASCAR.

== Atlanta Constitution ==
Bisher wrote his first column for The Atlanta Constitution on April 15, 1950, and became well known regionally and nationally during his fifty-nine years as a sports reporter, columnist and editor for the Constitution, its afternoon sister, The Atlanta Journal, and their combined successor, The Atlanta Journal-Constitution. Bisher also wrote articles and columns for The Sporting News, Sports Illustrated, The Saturday Evening Post, and several other national publications. His final column for The Atlanta Journal-Constitution was published online on Saturday, October 10, 2009, with the print version appearing in the October 11, 2009 Sunday paper.

He became embroiled in a national controversy in 1962 after he contributed to an article for The Saturday Evening Post which alleged that the University of Georgia's former head football coach and then-current athletic director Wally Butts and coach Bear Bryant of the University of Alabama conspired to fix the outcome of a college football game. Bisher conducted several interviews for the story that were ultimately not used in the final published version of the article. In a libel suit brought by Butts, the U.S. Supreme Court ruled in Butts' favor. Bryant reached an out-of-court settlement with The Saturday Evening Post. Commenting on the controversy years later, Bisher called it the "Ugliest part of my career. . . . Some people in Alabama still think I wrote it."

Time magazine named Bisher one of the nation's five best columnists in 1961. He is a member of the National Sportscasters and Sportswriters Hall of Fame, the University of North Carolina Journalism Hall of Fame, the Georgia Golf Hall of Fame, the International Golf Writers Hall of Fame, the Georgia Sports Hall of Fame, the Atlanta Sports Hall of Fame, and the Atlanta Press Club Hall of Fame. He was chosen the Georgia Sportswriter of the Year on sixteen occasions, and recognized by the Associated Press for the best Georgia story of the year over twenty times. He received numerous other awards over the years, including the Associated Press Sports Editors' Red Smith Award, and the William D. Richardson Award from the Golf Writers Association of America.

Bisher was the president of the Football Writers Association of America from 1959 to 1960, and the president of the National Sportscasters and Sportswriters Association from 1974 to 1976. He was an outspoken proponent of professional sports in Atlanta, and was a charter member of the Atlanta–Fulton County Stadium Authority at a time when it wasn't deemed a conflict of interest for a journalist to serve in such a capacity.

He co-wrote the first autobiography of Hank Aaron, titled Aaron, RF upon its initial release in 1968. In 1974, with Aaron about to become the all-time home run king, Bisher added an afterword to include the seasons from 1968 through 1973. The new edition was simply titled Aaron, as the subject was no longer a right fielder.

Bisher habitually signed off his columns with the Hebrew word "Selah" from the Book of Psalms. After retiring from The Atlanta Journal-Constitution in 2009, he continued to write a column for the Gwinnett Daily Post in Gwinnett County, Georgia in suburban Atlanta, starting in January 2010. He estimated that he had written 15,000 daily sports columns, 1,200 magazine articles and more than a dozen books.

Until the age of 90, Bisher held seniority over the hundreds of golf reporters and other sports journalists who descend on Augusta, Georgia, each April for the Masters Tournament. During the 2006 tournament, The Golf Channel profiled Bisher as the "dean" of Masters journalists. Bisher covered every Kentucky Derby since 1950, and every Super Bowl but the first.

== Death ==
Bisher died from a heart attack on March 18, 2012. He was survived by his second wife Lynda and two of his three sons from his first marriage.

== Bibliography ==
- Bisher, Furman, Aaron, Crowell, New York (1968).
- Bisher, Furman, The Birth of A Legend: Arnold Palmer's Golden Year 1960, Prentice-Hall, Inc., Englewood Cliffs, New Jersey (1972).
- Bisher, Furman, The Furman Bisher Collection, Taylor Publishing, Dallas, Texas (1989).
- Bisher, Furman, The Masters: Augusta Revisited–An Intimate View, Oxmoor House, Birmingham, Alabama (1976).
- Bisher, Furman, Miracle in Atlanta: the Atlanta Braves Story, World Publishing Co. (1966).
- Bisher, Furman, Strange But True Baseball Stories, Random House, New York, New York (1966).
- Bisher, Furman, with introduction by Bing Crosby, With a Southern Exposure, Thomas Nelson Publishing, New York, New York (1962).
