= Haden Place =

Historic house in North Carolina, United States

- U.S. National Register of Historic Places
- Location within North Carolina Location within the United States
- Location: SR 1156, near Tyro, North Carolina
- Coordinates: 35°45′56″N 80°21′34″W
- Area: 148.5 acres (60.1 ha)
- Built: 1800-1820
- Architectural style: Greek Revival, Federal
- MPS: Davidson County MRA
- NRHP reference No.: 84002009
- Added to NRHP: July 10, 1984

Haden Place is a historic home located near Tyro, Davidson County, North Carolina. It was built between about 1800 and 1820, and is a two-story, three bay by two bay, transitional Late Federal / Greek Revival style frame dwelling. Also on the property is a contributing family cemetery dated to the 1820s.

It was added to the National Register of Historic Places in 1984.
