= Mor-Val Hosiery Mill =

Historic textile mill in North Carolina, US

- U.S. National Register of Historic Places
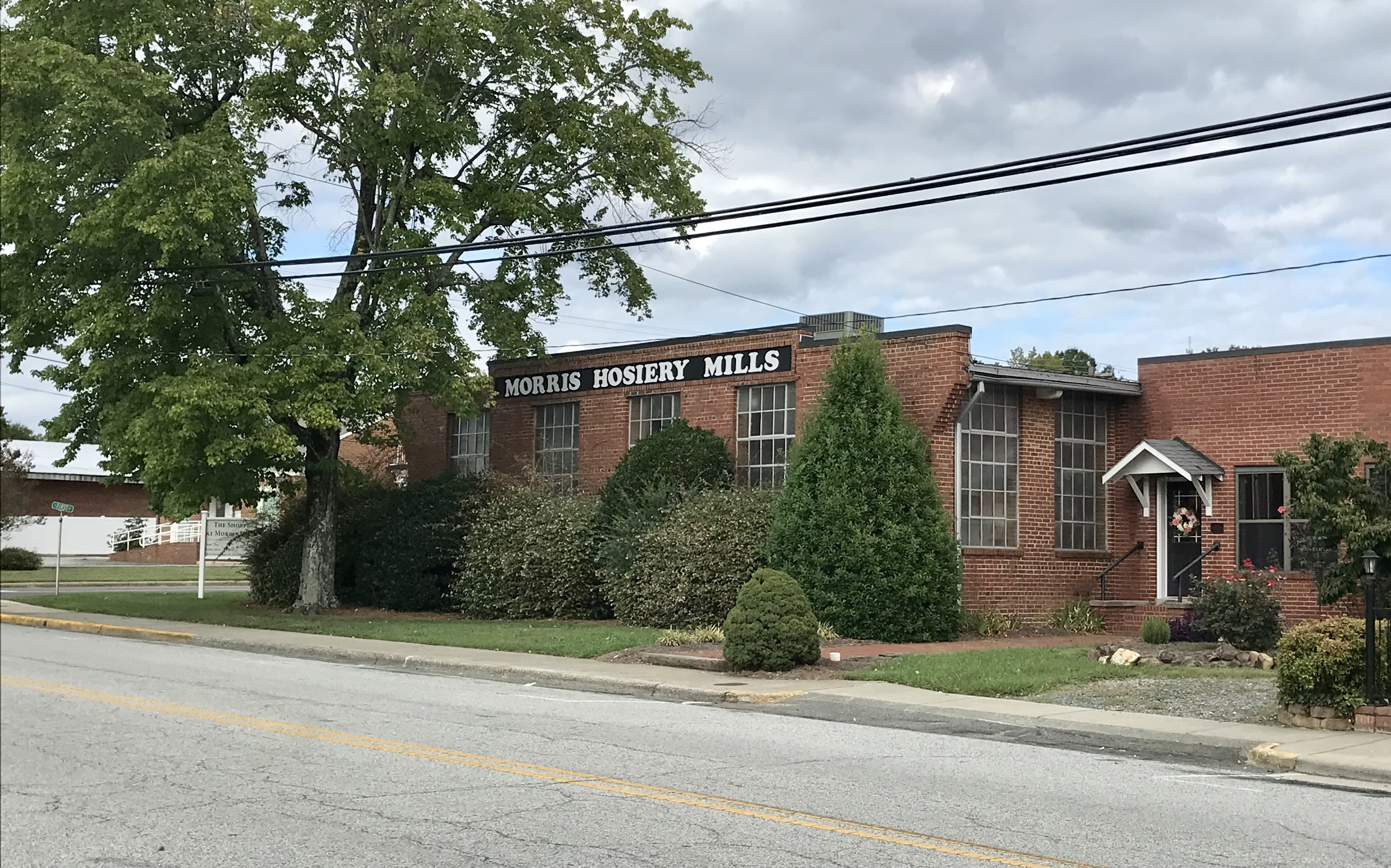

- Location within North Carolina Location within the United States
- Location: N. Main and E. First Sts., Denton, North Carolina
- Coordinates: 35°38′4″N 80°6′49″W
- Area: less than one acre
- Built: 1936
- Built by: Cranford, Carly
- Architectural style: mill construction
- NRHP reference No.: 01001074
- Added to NRHP: October 5, 2001

Mor-Val Hosiery Mill, also known as Morris Mill, is a historic textile mill located at Denton, Davidson County, North Carolina. It was built in 1936, and is a one-story brick building consisting of a manufacturing area and office wing. It has a low-pitched roof and oversized windows. The mill remained in operation until about 1965.

It was added to the National Register of Historic Places in 2001.
