= Capt. John Koonts Jr. Farm =

Historic farm in North Carolina, United States

- U.S. National Register of Historic Places
- Location within North Carolina Location within the United States
- Location: SR 1186, near Tyro, North Carolina
- Coordinates: 35°50′43″N 80°22′59″W
- Area: 210 acres (85 ha)
- Built: c. 1870
- Architectural style: Greek Revival, Italianate, Italianate Revival
- MPS: Davidson County MRA
- NRHP reference No.: 84002131
- Added to NRHP: July 10, 1984

Capt. John Koonts Jr. Farm is a historic home and farm complex located near Tyro, Davidson County, North Carolina. The house was built about 1870, and consists of a two-story, hexagonal Italianate Revival style central section with three Greek Revival style one-story wings in a "Y"-plan. Also on the property are a double pen log barn, a log corn crib, a log granary, and a frame well house.

It was added to the National Register of Historic Places in 1984.
