= Mount Ebal Methodist Protestant Church =

Historic church in North Carolina, United States

- U.S. National Register of Historic Places
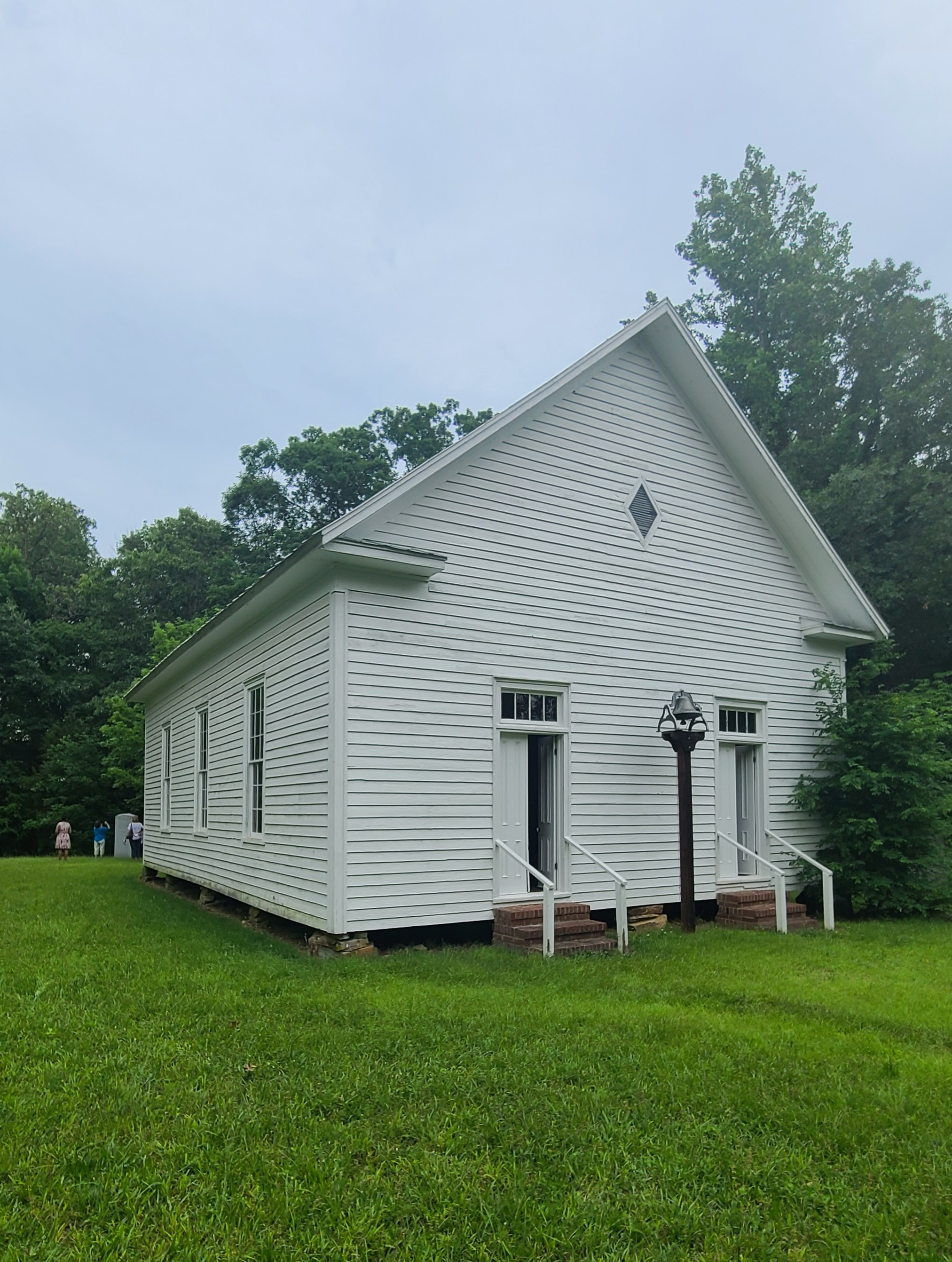

- Location within North Carolina Location within the United States
- Location: End of SR 2518, near Denton, North Carolina
- Coordinates: 35°37′34″N 80°4′5″W
- Area: 1.9 acres (0.77 ha)
- Built: 1883
- Architect: Sexton, John T.; Thompson, Alfred
- MPS: Davidson County MRA
- NRHP reference No.: 84002143
- Added to NRHP: July 10, 1984

Mount Ebal Methodist Protestant Church is a historic property of the Methodist Protestant Church located at the end of SR 2518 near Denton in Davidson County, North Carolina. It was built in 1883, and is a one-story, gabled frame building, 36 feet wide and 48 feet deep. The building rests on fieldstone piers. The building had ceased to be in regular use by about 1940, although an annual homecoming takes place in June each year.

Also on the property is a contributing church cemetery.

The property was added to the National Register of Historic Places in 1984.
