= Denton, North Carolina =

- Town
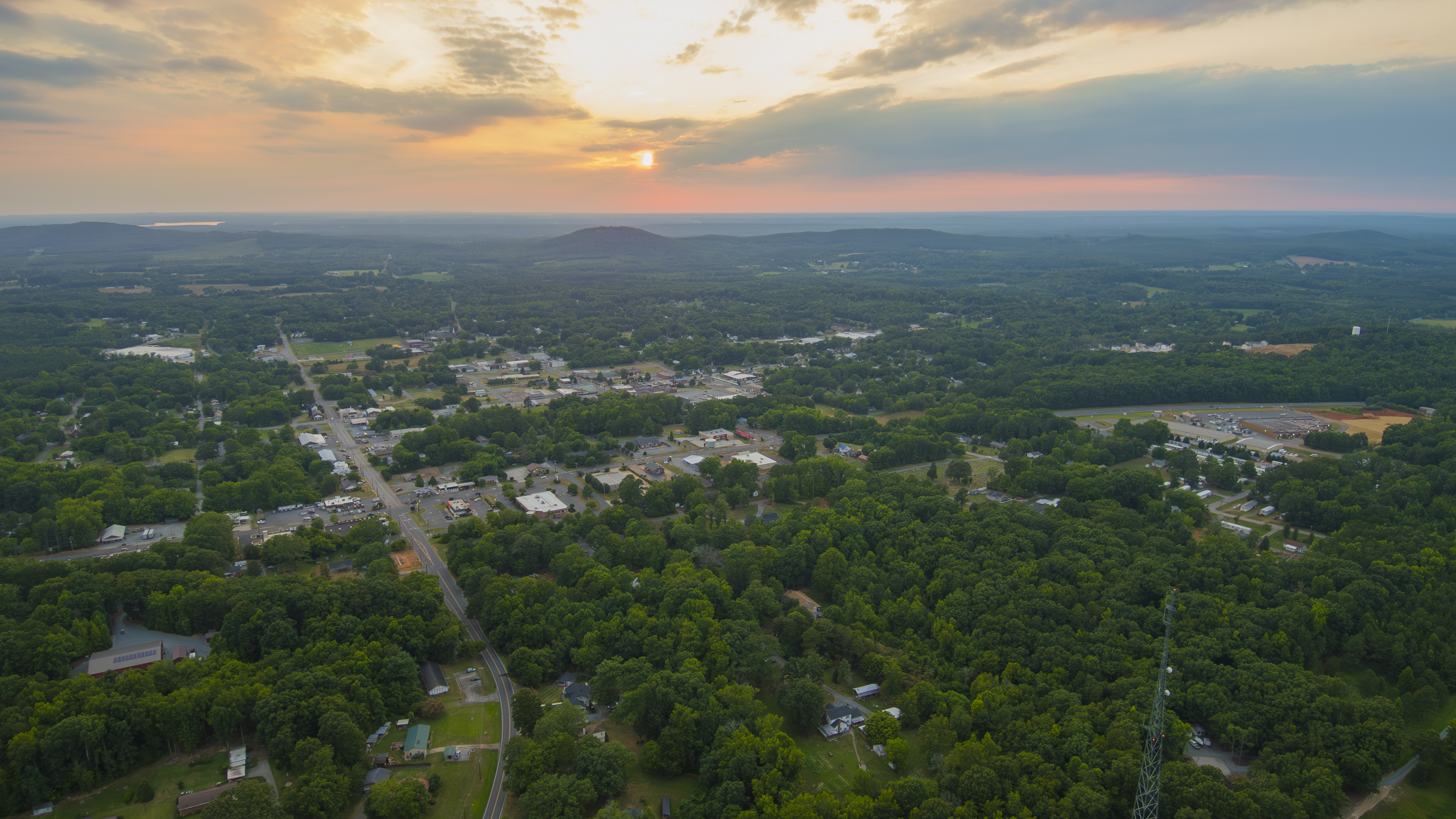
- Salisbury Street

- Seal

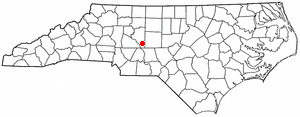
- Location of Denton, North Carolina
- Coordinates: 35°37′14″N 80°05′52″W
- Country: United States
- State: North Carolina
- County: Davidson

Government
  - Mayor: Scott Morris

Area
  - Total: 2.11 sq mi (5.46 km^{2})
  - Land: 2.10 sq mi (5.45 km^{2})
  - Water: 0.0077 sq mi (0.02 km^{2})
- Elevation: 712 ft (217 m)

Population (2020)
  - Total: 1,494
  - Density: 710.5/sq mi (274.32/km^{2})
- Time zone: UTC−5 (Eastern (EST))
  - Summer (DST): UTC−4 (EDT)
- ZIP Code: 27239
- Area code: 336
- FIPS code: 37-16980
- GNIS feature ID: 2406375
- Website: www.townofdenton.com

Denton is a town in Davidson County, North Carolina, United States. As of the 2020 census, the population of the town was 1,494.

== Geography ==
Denton is located in southern Davidson County 17 miles (27 km) southeast of Lexington, the county seat.

According to the United States Census Bureau, the town has a total area of 2.0 square miles (5.1 km^{2}), of which 0.006 square miles (0.015 km^{2}), or 0.31%, is water.

=== Climate ===
Climate data for Denton, North Carolina
Month	Jan	Feb	Mar	Apr	May	Jun	Jul	Aug	Sep	Oct	Nov	Dec	Year
Record high °F (°C)	78 (26)	82 (28)	92 (33)	93 (34)	97 (36)	103 (39)	104 (40)	105 (41)	100 (38)	96 (36)	87 (31)	79 (26)	105 (41)
Mean daily maximum °F (°C)	49 (9)	54 (12)	62 (17)	71 (22)	78 (26)	84 (29)	88 (31)	86 (30)	80 (27)	71 (22)	62 (17)	52 (11)	70 (21)
Mean daily minimum °F (°C)	30 (−1)	33 (1)	40 (4)	48 (9)	56 (13)	65 (18)	69 (21)	68 (20)	61 (16)	49 (9)	40 (4)	33 (1)	49 (10)
Record low °F (°C)	−8 (−22)	2 (−17)	8 (−13)	25 (−4)	33 (1)	39 (4)	45 (7)	46 (8)	36 (2)	21 (−6)	10 (−12)	−1 (−18)	−8 (−22)
Average precipitation inches (mm)	3.83 (97)	3.78 (96)	4.02 (102)	3.64 (92)	3.52 (89)	3.90 (99)	4.08 (104)	4.17 (106)	3.94 (100)	3.68 (93)	3.41 (87)	3.27 (83)	45.24 (1,148)
Source: The Weather Channel

== Demographics ==
Historical population
Census	Pop.	Note	%±
1910	320		—
1920	559		74.7%
1930	540		−3.4%
1940	677		25.4%
1950	766		13.1%
1960	852		11.2%
1970	1,017		19.4%
1980	949		−6.7%
1990	1,292		36.1%
2000	1,450		12.2%
2010	1,636		12.8%
2020	1,494		−8.7%
U.S. Decennial Census

=== 2020 census ===
Denton racial composition
Race	Number	Percentage
White (non-Hispanic)	1,393	93.24%
Black or African American (non-Hispanic)	7	0.47%
Native American	4	0.27%
Asian	12	0.8%
Pacific Islander	2	0.13%
Other/Mixed	52	3.48%
Hispanic or Latino	24	1.61%

As of the 2020 United States census, there were 1,494 people, 671 households, and 403 families residing in the town.

=== 2010 census ===
As of the census of 2010, there were 1,636 people. The population density was 821.5 inhabitants per square mile (317.2/km^{2}). There were 651 housing units at an average density of 368.8 per square mile (142.4/km^{2}). The racial makeup of the town was 98.07% White, 0.62% African American, 0.34% Asian, 0.34% from other races, and 0.62% from two or more races. Hispanic or Latino of any race were 2.00% of the population.

There were 595 households, out of which 34.1% had children under the age of 18 living with them, 51.8% were married couples living together, 11.8% had a female householder with no husband present, and 30.9% were non-families. 26.2% of all households were made up of individuals, and 11.9% had someone living alone who was 65 years of age or older. The average household size was 2.44 and the average family size was 2.89.

In the town, the population was spread out, with 25.9% under the age of 18, 6.6% from 18 to 24, 33.3% from 25 to 44, 19.7% from 45 to 64, and 14.4% who were 65 years of age or older. The median age was 36 years. For every 100 females, there were 90.8 males. For every 100 females age 18 and over, there were 88.1 males.

The median income for a household in the town was $30,950, and the median income for a family was $40,375. Males had a median income of $28,571 versus $21,354 for females. The per capita income for the town was $19,439. About 11.2% of families and 14.4% of the population were below the poverty line, including 23.1% of those under age 18 and 10.5% of those age 65 or over.

== History ==
The land that is now Denton was originally inhabited by Native American peoples long before European settlement. During the colonial era, the region formed part of the vast land holdings of Lord Granville, a descendant of Sir George Carteret, one of the original Lords Proprietors of Carolina. Lord Granville eventually sold his interests in North Carolina to King George II. This royal holding stretched from the Virginia border southward to an area a few miles beyond the present site of Denton. Following the American Revolutionary War, the Crown lost control of these lands, and ownership passed to the State of North Carolina.

In 1819, Richardson Finch purchased 517 acres that included the hill at the modern intersection of East Salisbury Street and North Carolina Highway 109. At the time the area became known as Finch's Hill, later also called Red Hill, a name still used locally today when referring to the intersection. As the community slowly developed around Finch's property, the settlement became known as Finch's Cross Roads.

The community began to develop more formally in 1877 when local schoolteacher Branson Ivey Harrison petitioned the federal government to establish a nearby post office for residents of Finch's Cross Roads. After his initial name suggestions were rejected, fellow resident Samuel Moses Peacock suggested the name Denton, inspired by the name of a town in Texas. The name was accepted, and on July 12, 1878, the Denton Post Office officially opened with Peacock serving as the first postmaster. At the time, only four families lived within what are now the town's limits.

In 1906, Harrison sold a right-of-way across his land for the extension of the Thomasville and Glen Anna Railroad to Denton. Regular rail service began in 1912 after the line was renamed the Carolina and Yadkin Railroad and extended to High Rock. The railroad stimulated rapid economic growth, particularly through the timber industry. Denton became a major center for producing railroad cross ties, with nearly 200,000 ties shipped annually during the peak years of 1917–1918. This earned Denton the nickname “The Cross Tie Capital of the Country.”

The growth brought by the railroad led to Denton's formal incorporation. On March 11, 1907, the North Carolina General Assembly incorporated the Town of Denton. J. E. Varner served as the town's first mayor,

The Adderton - Badgett House, Chapel Hill Church Tabernacle, Mor-Val Hosiery Mill, and Mount Ebal Methodist Protestant Church are listed on the National Register of Historic Places.

== Attractions ==
- The Southeast Old Threshers' Reunion, described as "the largest antique tractor and engine show in the Southeast", takes place during the July 4 holiday at Denton FarmPark, a historical park with several restored buildings. A one-day event with airplane rides later expanded to include displays of farm equipment to give people something to do while they waited. As of the 48th annual event in 2018, over 50,000 attended from 20 states, and the five-day event includes 125 vendors, train and helicopter rides, musical performances and fireworks. The primary purpose is to teach people, especially children, about the history of agriculture. Lawn and garden equipment was added in 2018. The Denton FarmPark also hosts a variety of other festivals and events such as: The Annual Malpass Brothers Country & Bluegrass Music Festival, Fun on the Farm Fall Festival, Country Christmas Train, Carolina Pickers Antique Festival & Swap Meet, Denton Military Show, and Jeeps on the Farm, along with performances by various musical acts.

== Education ==
Denton has two area elementary schools; Denton Elementary and Silver Valley Elementary. Silver Valley is the smallest elementary school in the Davidson County Schools system, having just under 275 students. Denton Elementary is almost twice the size of Silver Valley, with about 460 children. Both schools feed into South Davidson Middle and High School, which lies just a mile north of the Denton town limits. South Davidson Middle has just under 395 students. The middle school feeds into the adjoined high school, South Davidson High School. South Davidson is the smallest high school in Davidson County with 413 students at the 2011–2012 school year. The closest college to Denton is Davidson County Community College, a two-year college in northern Davidson County. The closest four-year college is Pfeiffer University, located 19 miles south, near Richfield.

== Notable people ==
- Furman Bisher, sportswriter
- Max Lanier, baseball player
- Hal Lanier, baseball player, coach, and manager
- Bobby Wilkins, baseball player
- Bob Welborn, NASCAR driver; named one of NASCAR's 50 Greatest Drivers
- Stan Bingham, North Carolina Senator
