= Linwood, North Carolina =

- Unincorporated community
- Location within the state of North Carolina
- Coordinates: 35°45′02″N 80°19′04″W
- Country: United States
- State: North Carolina
- County: Davidson
- Elevation: 656 ft (200 m)

Population (2020)
  - Total: 5,260
- Time zone: UTC-5 (Eastern (EST))
  - Summer (DST): UTC-4 (EDT)
- ZIP codes: 27299
- GNIS feature ID: 988516

Linwood is a small unincorporated community (ZIP Code 27299) just south of Lexington in Davidson County, North Carolina, United States. The area contains operations of several important companies in Davidson County, including Keply Hardwood, Legget-Platt, PPG Industries, LMI Builders, and Owens & Minor. Three major transportation systems serve the area: Interstate 85, the Davidson County Airport, and Norfolk Southern Railway's Spencer classification yard. Linwood was named for the nearby plantation of William Rainey Holt (1798-1868), a physician and early innovator in farming techniques. Part of the community (mainly the area industries) has been annexed by the city of Lexington. Public High Schools that have districts that are in Linwood are Central Davidson High School and West Davidson High School.

Beallmont, Jersey Baptist Church Cemetery, and Jersey Settlement Meeting House are listed on the National Register of Historic Places.
