= Reeds, North Carolina =

- Unincorporated community
- Location within the state of North Carolina
- Coordinates: 35°50′46″N 80°19′53″W
- Country: United States
- State: North Carolina
- County: Davidson
- Elevation: 843 ft (257 m)
- Time zone: UTC-5 (Eastern (EST))
  - Summer (DST): UTC-4 (EDT)
- GNIS feature ID: 993166

Reeds (referred to as "Reeds Crossroads" on many maps) is an unincorporated community in Tyro township, Davidson County, North Carolina. It is located at the intersection of Old US Highway 64 and NC Highway 150. Neighboring communities and municipalities include Churchland, Tyro, Arcadia, Yadkin College, and Lexington.

== Schools ==
- Reeds Elementary
