= Adderton–Badgett House =

Historic house in North Carolina, United States

- U.S. National Register of Historic Places
- Location within North Carolina Location within the United States
- Location: SR 2529, near Denton, North Carolina
- Coordinates: 35°34′02″N 80°08′36″W
- Area: 204.5 acres (82.8 ha)
- Built: c. 1850
- Architectural style: I-house
- MPS: Davidson County MRA
- NRHP reference No.: 84001988
- Added to NRHP: July 10, 1984

The Adderton–Badgett House is a historic house located near Denton, Davidson County, North Carolina.

== Description and history ==
It was built around 1850, and is a two-story, four-bay, log I-house. It has a gable roof, exterior end chimneys, and sits on a fieldstone pier foundation.

It was added to the National Register of Historic Places on July 10, 1984.
