= Pilot, Davidson County, North Carolina =

Pilot, North Carolina
- Populated place
- Location within North Carolina Location within the United States
- Coordinates: 35.8801370°N 80.1294899°W
- Country: United States
- State: North Carolina
- County: Davidson
- Elevation: 791 ft (241 m)
- Time zone: UTC-5 (Eastern (EST))
  - Summer (DST): UTC-4 (EDT)
- ZIP code: 27360
- Area code: 336
- GNIS feature ID: 1021897

Pilot is a populated place in Davidson County, North Carolina, United States.

== Geography ==
Pilot is located at latitude 35.8801370 and longitude -80.1294899. The elevation is 791 feet.
