= Extended day program =

An extended day program is a before- or after-school voluntary program held typically in an elementary school for students whose parents work beyond school hours, since records show that 65 percent of working parents work until 5:30 p.m or longer. It is supervised by an adult or two and the kids play outdoors, sometimes on the playground, or indoors, possibly in the gymnasium or in a classroom. Often it is privately funded, that is, paid for by parents rather than by the school system.

Recent studies suggest that an extended school day focused on instruction rather than daycare may improve academic achievement for some students and help close the achievement gap. These findings led to the formation of the TIME Collaborative, a partnership between the Ford Foundation and the National Center on Time & Learning (NCTL) intended to develop high-quality and sustainable expanded learning time schools in five states: Colorado, Connecticut, Massachetts, New York, and Tennessee. This collaborative effort promotes the use of federal funds from the Elementary and Secondary Education Act waiver process to add at least 300 hours of more learning time for all students in participating schools. These efforts are built on the premise that breaking away from conventional calendars and schedules by expanding the length and quality of the school day in high-performing, high-poverty schools has the potential to improve academic achievement, broaden curriculum (including time for non-tested subjects such as science, social studies, music, art, and physical education), and empower teachers by giving them more time to collaborate.

== See also ==
- After-school activity
