= Silver Valley, North Carolina =

- Unincorporated community
- Location within the state of North Carolina
- Coordinates: 35°43′57″N 80°06′11″W
- Country: United States
- State: North Carolina
- County: Davidson
- Elevation: 732 ft (223 m)
- Time zone: UTC-5 (Eastern (EST))
  - Summer (DST): UTC-4 (EDT)
- GNIS feature ID: 1024304

Silver Valley is an unincorporated community in eastern Davidson County, North Carolina located along Old U.S. Highway 64 and Old North Carolina State Highway 109 south of Thomasville, North Carolina and southeast of Lexington, North Carolina.

The name Silver Valley is generally accepted to be the site of the first precious metal, silver, found in North Carolina. A colonial road went through Silver Valley. It is now Old NC 10.

Gold and silver deposits are a result of geologic faults in the area. Other gold deposits were found further south near El Dorado in what is now Uwharrie National Forest. After land was acquired for Uwharrie in the 1930s, the last American gold rush occurred. Though gold and silver were recovered, the area was never a huge economic success. Around 1900, new silver finds in Silver Valley prompted interest in silver. Just to the North, in the city of Thomasville, a building was constructed for a silver refinery, and the High point, Thomasville, and Denton railroad was extended to Silver Valley. The first rails were slim poplar logs to reduce cost. Before the refinery became active, the silver ran out, and the building was acquired by the organization's accountant. The building became Amazon Cotton Mills, which at some point was acquired by Cannon Mills in Kannapolis, NC. The "zon", as locals referred to the mill, employed many young boys as soon as they turned 16, and offered a special half-shift from 4pm to 8pm to accommodate school work. The name of the mill is now Parkdale, and is still in business.

Silver Valley became a commuter community to Thomasville with workers employed in the many furniture factories and 17 cotton mills. When the mills closed with the exodus of textiles and furniture to Asia, the area became another ambiguous area.
