= Churchland, North Carolina =

- Unincorporated community
- Location within the state of North Carolina
- Coordinates: 35°47′10″N 80°25′03″W
- Country: United States
- State: North Carolina
- County: Davidson
- Elevation: 837 ft (255 m)
- Time zone: UTC-5 (Eastern (EST))
  - Summer (DST): UTC-4 (EDT)
- ZIP codes: 27299, 27292
- Area code: 336
- GNIS feature ID: 983193

Churchland is an unincorporated community in Boone Township, Davidson County, North Carolina located along North Carolina Highway 150 southwest of Lexington, North Carolina. Churchland Baptist Church and Churchland Elementary School are centered in the Churchland community. Churchland is protected by Churchland Volunteer Fire Department.

== History ==
The Philip Sowers House was added to the National Register of Historic Places in 1980.

Churchland is also the home to Boone's Cave Park. The 110 acre State Park is named after America pioneer Daniel Boone.

== Churchland Baptist Church ==
Churchland Baptist Church's name has changed several times through the years. It was originally constituted May 17, 1837 by Elders Joseph Pickler and Josiah Wiseman, pastors of Fork Church and Jersey churches as the "Baptist Church of Christ at Piney Meeting House". Former pastors include Rev. J. O. Walton, Rev. Tony Gurgannus, Rev. Everette Chapman (1966–1967), Rev. Dale R. Martin, Rev. Dr. Paul Millwood, Dr. Stephen Martin, Rev. Noel Schoonmaker, Rev. Ray Nance Howell IV, Dr. Hunter Duncan, Rev. Robbie Stephens (2017-2020), Rev. John Huckaby (6/21-9/23) and Dr. Don Clement (8/5/24). For the 150th anniversary, the church history was published in a compilation titled Reflections, by Hugh E. Greene and Vernelle S. Greene.

== Churchland Elementary School ==
The current site of Churchland Elementary School was originally Churchland High School until 1957 when the "new" West Davidson High School opened. Both are part of the Davidson County School System. The name and grades then changed to the elementary school. History has it that the original school on this site was founded in the early 1900s by Mr. Hasty. A detailed article can be found in the Volume 9, Number 2, Spring 1977 issue of Homespun, a Davidson County periodical.

== Business ==
Aside from a few small workshops and stores, the only major business located in Churchland was Orrell's Food Service. Orrell's was one of the largest food distributors in Central North Carolina, with distribution all over the state and Southern Virginia. The business operated from its office and warehouse on Highway 150. Orrell's Cold Storage was founded in 1954 by the brothers, Herman and Roy Orrell. The 800-square-foot (74 m^{2}) facility offered custom butchering and processing of beef and pork. Within a couple of years Herman purchased Roy's interest in the business and in 1962 was joined by his son Tony, who was president and CEO of Orrell's Food Service until May 2023 when the business was purchased by Ben E. Keith Company (Website) from Ft Worth, Texas. This location has been renamed Ben E. Keith Foods – Carolina Division.
